= 2010 term United States Supreme Court opinions of Antonin Scalia =

The 2010 term of the Supreme Court of the United States began October 4, 2010, and concluded October 1, 2011. This was the twenty-fifth term of Associate Justice Antonin Scalia's tenure on the Court.
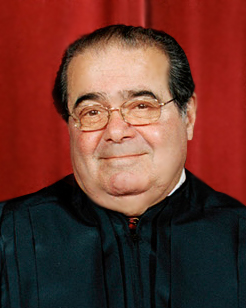

Antonin Scalia 2010 term statistics

10	Majority or plurality	11	Concurrence	0	Other
9	Dissent	1	Concurrence/dissent	Total =	31
Bench opinions = 28		Opinions relating to orders = 3		In-chambers opinions = 0
Unanimous opinions: 1		Most joined by: Thomas (15)		Least joined by: Kagan (4)

Type	Case	Citation	Issues	Joined by	Other opinions
	Ransom v. FIA Card Services, N. A. • [full text]	562 U.S. 61 (2011)	Chapter 13 • Bankruptcy Abuse Prevention and Consumer Protection Act of 2005 • means test		Kagan
Scalia dissented from the Court's opinion holding that a car ownership cost income exemption for Chapter 13 debtors was only available to car owners who made lease or loan payments. The relevant bankruptcy provision incorporated certain cost tables prepared by the IRS as part of the Chapter 13 means test for determining how much income debtors had available to repay creditors. Scalia believed that the statutory phrase "applicable monthly expense amounts" simply directed courts, in this instance, to look at the table column corresponding to how many cars the debtor owned, not to examine whether the debtor actually had real costs of that kind. He also disagreed with the Court's use, in aid of its interpretation, of IRS materials that were supplemental to the tables because the bankruptcy statutes did not incorporate or reference those materials in any way.
	NASA v. Nelson	562 U.S. 134 (2011)	background check of prospective federal employees • informational privacy • Privacy Act of 1974	Thomas	Alito; Thomas
	Thompson v. North American Stainless, LP	562 U.S. 170 (2011)	Title VII • employer retaliation against third-party	Roberts, Kennedy, Thomas, Ginsburg, Breyer, Alito, Sotomayor	Ginsburg
	Bruesewitz v. Wyeth LLC	562 U.S. 223 (2011)	National Childhood Vaccine Injury Act of 1986 • state law design defect claims • federal preemption	Roberts, Kennedy, Thomas, Breyer, Alito	Breyer; Sotomayor
	Michigan v. Bryant	562 U.S. 344 (2011)	Sixth Amendment • Confrontation Clause • hearsay exception for statements to help police address ongoing emergency		Sotomayor; Thomas; Ginsburg
	Staub v. Proctor Hospital	562 U.S. 411 (2011)	Uniformed Services Employment and Reemployment Rights Act of 1994 • influence of prior discrimination on subsequent decisionmaker	Roberts, Kennedy, Ginsburg, Breyer, Sotomayor	Alito
	Wall v. Kholi	562 U.S. 545 (2011)	Antiterrorism and Effective Death Penalty Act of 1996 • tolling of habeas corpus statute of limitations • motion to reduce sentence as application for collateral review		Alito
	Allen v. Lawhorn • [full text]	562 U.S. 1118 (2010)	Antiterrorism and Effective Death Penalty Act • Sixth Amendment • ineffective assistance of counsel	Thomas, Alito	
Scalia dissented from the Court's denial of certiorari, where the Eleventh Circuit had set aside a death sentence because the defense attorney did not give a closing argument at sentencing. Scalia believed the Eleventh Circuit failed to properly find that the omission of a closing argument was prejudicial and failed to comply with AEDPA by giving the necessary deference to the state court's judgment. In conclusion, Scalia wrote that "I would not dissent from denial of certiorari if what happened here were an isolated judicial error. It is not. With distressing frequency, especially in capital cases such as this, federal judges refuse to be governed by Congress's command [under AEDPA]...We invite continued lawlessness when we permit a patently improper interference with state justice such as that which occurred in this case to stand."
	Kasten v. Saint-Gobain Performance Plastics Corp.	563 U.S. 1 (2011)	Fair Labor Standards Act of 1938 • antiretaliation provision • oral intracompany complaints	Thomas (in part)	Breyer
	Connick v. Thompson	563 U.S. 51 (2011)	single violation as basis for Section 1983 claim • failure to make Brady disclosure • failure to train prosecutors	Alito	Thomas; Ginsburg
	Arizona Christian School Tuition Organization v. Winn	563 U.S. 125 (2011)	First Amendment • Establishment Clause • taxpayer standing	Thomas	Kennedy; Kagan
	Virginia Office for Protection and Advocacy v. Stewart	563 U.S. 247 (2011)	Eleventh Amendment • sovereign immunity • federal action by state agency against state officials for federal law violation • Supremacy Clause • Developmental Disabilities Assistance and Bill of Rights Act of 2000 • Protection and Advocacy for Individuals with Mental Illness Act	Kennedy, Thomas, Ginsburg, Breyer, Sotomayor	Kennedy; Roberts
	AT&T Mobility LLC v. Concepcion	563 U.S. 333 (2011)	Federal Arbitration Act • federal preemption • class actions	Roberts, Kennedy, Thomas, Alito	Thomas; Breyer
	Montana v. Wyoming	563 U.S. 368 (2011)	Yellowstone River Compact • water law • change in irrigation methods reducing downstream flow • doctrine of appropriation • doctrine of recapture		Thomas
	CIGNA Corp. v. Amara	563 U.S. 421 (2011)	ERISA • failure to provide proper notice of plan changes • court authority to reform plan as equitable relief	Thomas	Breyer
	General Dynamics Corp. v. United States	563 U.S. 478 (2011)	state secrets privilege • superior knowledge doctrine • remedy for dismissal of military contractor's affirmative defense	Unanimous	
	Brown v. Plata	563 U.S. 493 (2011)	Prison Litigation Reform Act of 1995 • Eighth Amendment • prison overcrowding	Thomas	Kennedy; Alito
	United States v. Tinklenberg	563 U.S. 647 (2011)	Speedy Trial Act of 1974 • effect of pretrial motions on delay	Roberts, Thomas	Breyer
	Fowler v. United States	563 U.S. 668 (2011)	federal witness tampering crime • likelihood victim was intending to communicate with federal officer		Breyer; Alito
	Camreta v. Greene	563 U.S. 692 (2011)	Article III • Case or Controversy Clause • standing • review of constitutional issue on appeal from defendant with qualified immunity • mootness		Kagan; Sotomayor; Kennedy
	Ashcroft v. al-Kidd	563 U.S. 731 (2011)	material witness arrest of terrorism suspects • pretextual motivation • Fourth Amendment • qualified immunity	Roberts, Kennedy, Thomas, Alito	Kennedy; Ginsburg; Sotomayor
	Sykes v. United States	564 U.S. 1 (2011)	Armed Career Criminal Act • felony vehicle flight as predicate offense under residual clause • void for vagueness		Kennedy; Thomas; Kagan
	Talk America, Inc. v. Michigan Bell Telephone Co.	564 U.S. 50 (2011)	Telecommunications Act of 1996 • incumbent local exchange carrier interconnection duty • entrance facility as part of network • deference to agency interpretation of agency rule		Thomas
	DePierre v. United States	564 U.S. 70 (2011)	Anti-Drug Abuse Act of 1986 • sentence enhancement for "cocaine base" • reliance on legislative history		Sotomayor
	Nevada Comm'n on Ethics v. Carrigan	564 U.S. 117 (2011)	vote recusal of state legislator with conflict of interest • First Amendment • overbreadth doctrine	Roberts, Kennedy, Thomas, Ginsburg, Breyer, Sotomayor, Kagan	Kennedy; Alito
	Wal-Mart Stores, Inc. v. Dukes	564 U.S. 338 (2011)	Title VII • class certification	Roberts, Kennedy, Thomas, Alito; Ginsburg, Breyer, Sotomayor, Kagan (in part)	Ginsburg
	Borough of Duryea v. Guarnieri	564 U.S. 379 (2011)	employer retaliation • First Amendment • public employee speech • Petition Clause		Kennedy; Thomas
	Stern v. Marshall	564 U.S. 462 (2011)	Article III • bankruptcy court authority to decide state law counterclaim		Roberts; Breyer
	Brown v. Entertainment Merchants Assn.	564 U.S. 786 (2011)	First Amendment • freedom of speech • restriction on sale of violent video games to minors	Kennedy, Ginsburg, Sotomayor, Kagan	Alito; Thomas; Breyer
	Derby v. United States	564 U.S. 1047 (2011)	Armed Career Criminal Act		
Scalia dissented from the Court's denial of certiorari in four cases involving the "residual provision" of the Armed Career Criminal Act.
	Beer v. United States	564 U.S. 1050 (2011)			
Scalia dissented from the Court's grant of certiorari, vacatur of the lower court's judgment, and remand. Scalia noted that he would grant cert. and instead set the case for argument.
