= 2010 term United States Supreme Court opinions of Sonia Sotomayor =

The 2010 term of the Supreme Court of the United States began October 4, 2010, and concluded October 1, 2011. This was the second term of Associate Justice Sonia Sotomayor's tenure on the Court.
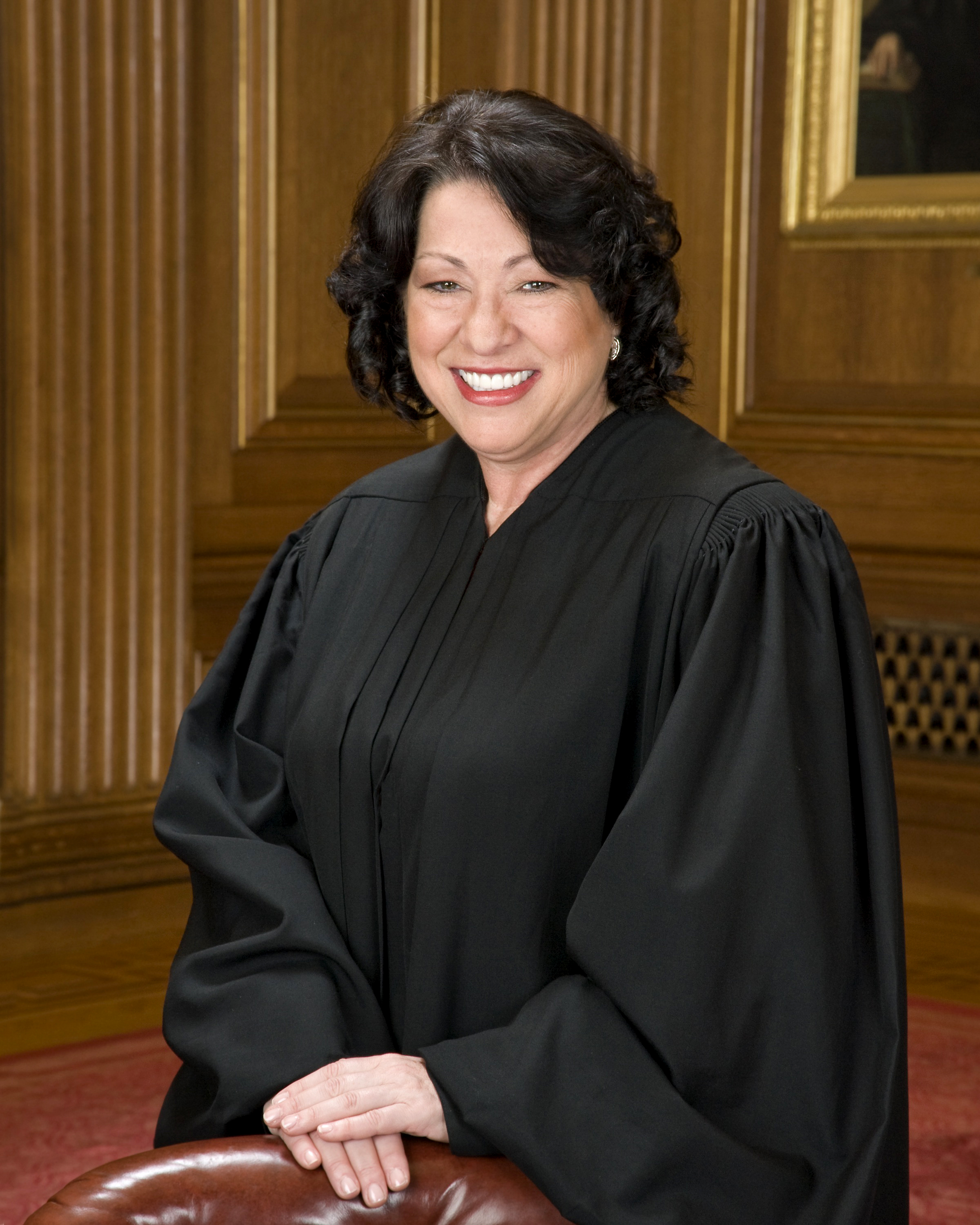

Sonia Sotomayor 2010 term statistics

7	Majority or plurality	8	Concurrence	1	Other
9	Dissent	0	Concurrence/dissent	Total =	25
Bench opinions = 22		Opinions relating to orders = 3		In-chambers opinions = 0
Unanimous opinions: 2		Most joined by: Breyer (13)		Least joined by: Thomas (3)

Type	Case	Citation	Issues	Joined by	Other opinions
	Chase Bank USA, N. A. v. McCoy	562 U.S. 195 (2011)	Truth in Lending Act • Regulation Z • credit card issuer change-in-terms notice requirements	Unanimous	
	Bruesewitz v. Wyeth LLC	562 U.S. 223 (2011)	National Childhood Vaccine Injury Act of 1986 • state law design defect claims • federal preemption	Ginsburg	Scalia; Breyer
	Williamson v. Mazda Motor of America, Inc.	562 U.S. 323 (2011)	National Traffic and Motor Vehicle Safety Act of 1966 • Federal Motor Vehicle Safety Standards on seat belt design • state law torts against auto manufacturers • federal preemption		Breyer; Thomas
	Michigan v. Bryant	562 U.S. 344 (2011)	Sixth Amendment • Confrontation Clause • hearsay exception for statements to help police address ongoing emergency	Roberts, Kennedy, Breyer, Alito	Thomas; Scalia; Ginsburg
	Pepper v. United States	562 U.S. 476 (2011)	Federal Sentencing Guidelines • consideration of postsentencing rehabilitation	Roberts, Scalia, Kennedy, Ginsburg; Breyer, Alito (in part)	Breyer; Alito; Thomas
	Pitre v. Cain • [full text]	562 U.S. 992 (2010)	Eighth Amendment • prison conditions • right to refuse medical treatment		
Sotomayor dissented from the Court's denial of certiorari. She believed that the lower courts erred in dismissing a prison inmate's complaint, which alleged that, as punishment for his refusal to take his HIV medication as a protest against his transfer to a prison facility, prison officials subjected him to hard labor in extreme heat that posed a serious risk to his health. Sotomayor argued that the inmate stated an Eighth Amendment claim for deliberate indifference, and that it was incorrect for the lower court to dismiss his complaint for his failure to submit evidence in support prior to a responsive pleading being submitted.
	Gamache v. California • [full text]	562 U.S. 1083 (2010)	harmless error • burden of proof	Ginsburg, Breyer, Kagan	
Sotomayor filed a statement respecting the Court's denial of certiorari. Prior to rendering a guilty verdict and death sentence, a jury had been given access to a damaging video tape depicting the defendant that had not been admitted into evidence. The California Supreme Court, stating that the defendant had the burden of proving prejudice, determined that the introduction of the tape was harmless error. Sotomayor wrote to correct the court's error of law, noting that under Supreme Court precedent the burden is instead upon the prosecution to prove beyond a reasonable doubt that a constitutional trial error was harmless. She believed, however, that based on the evidence and the court's analysis, the outcome would have been the same in this case regardless of how the burden was allocated, and so did not disagree with the denial of certiorari.
	Williams v. Hobbs • [full text]	562 U.S. 1097 (2010)	habeas corpus • evidentiary hearings • preservation of issues on appeal	Ginsburg	
Sotomayor dissented from the Court's denial of certiorari of a judgment reversing the granting of a habeas petition after an evidentiary hearing. The petitioner had been convicted of murder in state court and sentenced to death after his attorneys conceded his guilt at trial and failed to present any substantive mitigating evidence at sentencing. In District Court, he established that his counsel was ineffective and at the evidentiary hearing to establish prejudice, presented evidence of his childhood of abuse and neglect. In reversing the District Court's granting of the petition, the Eighth Circuit claimed that the State had preserved its objection to the evidentiary hearing, when in Sotomayor's view it not only made no clear objection but in fact, "voluntarily participate[d]...without objection, with an apparent intent of supplementing the record for its own purposes, and at a significant cost and expenditure of judicial resources." "Today", she wrote, "the Court refuses to review the Eighth Circuit's conclusion that a State may withhold an objection to a federal habeas evidentiary hearing until after the hearing is complete, the constitutional violation established, and habeas relief granted. Because I believe such a rule enables, and even invites, States to manipulate federal habeas proceedings to their own strategic advantage at an unacceptable cost to justice, I respectfully dissent."
	Matrixx Initiatives, Inc. v. Siracusano	563 U.S. 27 (2011)	Securities Exchange Act of 1934 • Rule 10b-5 • failure of pharmaceutical company to disclose evidence of drug side effect • materiality	Unanimous	
	Cullen v. Pinholster	563 U.S. 170 (2011)	Antiterrorism and Effective Death Penalty Act of 1996 • introduction of new evidence in habeas corpus proceedings • Sixth Amendment • ineffective assistance of counsel	Ginsburg, Kagan (in part)	Thomas; Alito; Breyer
	Sossamon v. Texas	563 U.S. 277 (2011)	prisoners' rights • Religious Land Use and Institutionalized Persons Act • Spending Clause • sovereign immunity	Breyer	Thomas
	United States v. Tohono O'odham Nation	563 U.S. 307 (2011)	Court of Federal Claims jurisdiction • separate suits based on same operative facts	Breyer	Kennedy; Ginsburg
	Chamber of Commerce of United States of America v. Whiting	563 U.S. 582 (2011)	Immigration Reform and Control Act • Legal Arizona Workers Act • state requirement that businesses use E-Verify • suspension or revocation of business licenses for hiring unauthorized aliens • federal preemption		Roberts; Breyer
	Camreta v. Greene	563 U.S. 692 (2011)	Article III • Case or Controversy Clause • standing • review of constitutional issue on appeal from defendant with qualified immunity • mootness	Breyer	Kagan; Scalia; Kennedy
	Ashcroft v. al-Kidd	563 U.S. 731 (2011)	material witness arrest of terrorism suspects • pretextual motivation • Fourth Amendment • qualified immunity	Ginsburg, Breyer	Scalia; Kennedy; Ginsburg
	Board of Trustees of Leland Stanford Junior Univ. v. Roche Molecular Systems, Inc.	563 U.S. 776 (2011)	patent law • University and Small Business Patent Procedures Act of 1980 • vesting of federally funded patents in inventors or contractors		Roberts; Breyer
	DePierre v. United States	564 U.S. 70 (2011)	Anti-Drug Abuse Act of 1986 • sentence enhancement for "cocaine base"	Roberts, Kennedy, Thomas, Ginsburg, Breyer, Alito, Kagan; Scalia (in part)	Scalia
	Microsoft Corp. v. i4i Ltd. Partnership	564 U.S. 91 (2011)	Patent Act of 1952 • presumption of patent validity • on-sale bar • clear and convincing evidence	Scalia, Kennedy, Ginsburg, Breyer, Alito, Kagan	Thomas; Breyer
	United States v. Jicarilla Apache Nation	564 U.S. 162 (2011)	fiduciary exception to attorney–client privilege • general trust relationship between the United States and Indian tribes		Alito; Ginsburg
	Davis v. United States	564 U.S. 229 (2011)	Fourth Amendment • exclusionary rule • good faith reliance on binding appellate precedent		Alito; Breyer
	J. D. B. v. North Carolina	564 U.S. 261 (2011)	Fifth Amendment • Miranda warning • effect of minor's age on determining custodial status	Kennedy, Ginsburg, Breyer, Kagan	Alito
	Tapia v. United States	564 U.S. 319 (2011)	extension of prison sentence to foster rehabilitation	Alito	Kagan
	Freeman v. United States	564 U.S. 522 (2011)	Sentencing Reform Act of 1984 • sentence reduction due to retroactive amendment of Sentencing Guidelines • plea bargain under Federal Rule of Criminal Procedure 11		Kennedy; Roberts
	PLIVA, Inc. v. Mensing	564 U.S. 604 (2011)	federal generic drug labeling requirements • federal preemption	Ginsburg, Breyer, Kagan	Thomas
	Bullcoming v. New Mexico	564 U.S. 647 (2011)	Sixth Amendment • Confrontation Clause • forensic laboratory report as testimony		Ginsburg; Kennedy
