= 2010 term United States Supreme Court opinions of Clarence Thomas =

The 2010 term of the Supreme Court of the United States began October 4, 2010, and concluded October 1, 2011. This was the twentieth term of Associate Justice Clarence Thomas's tenure on the Court.
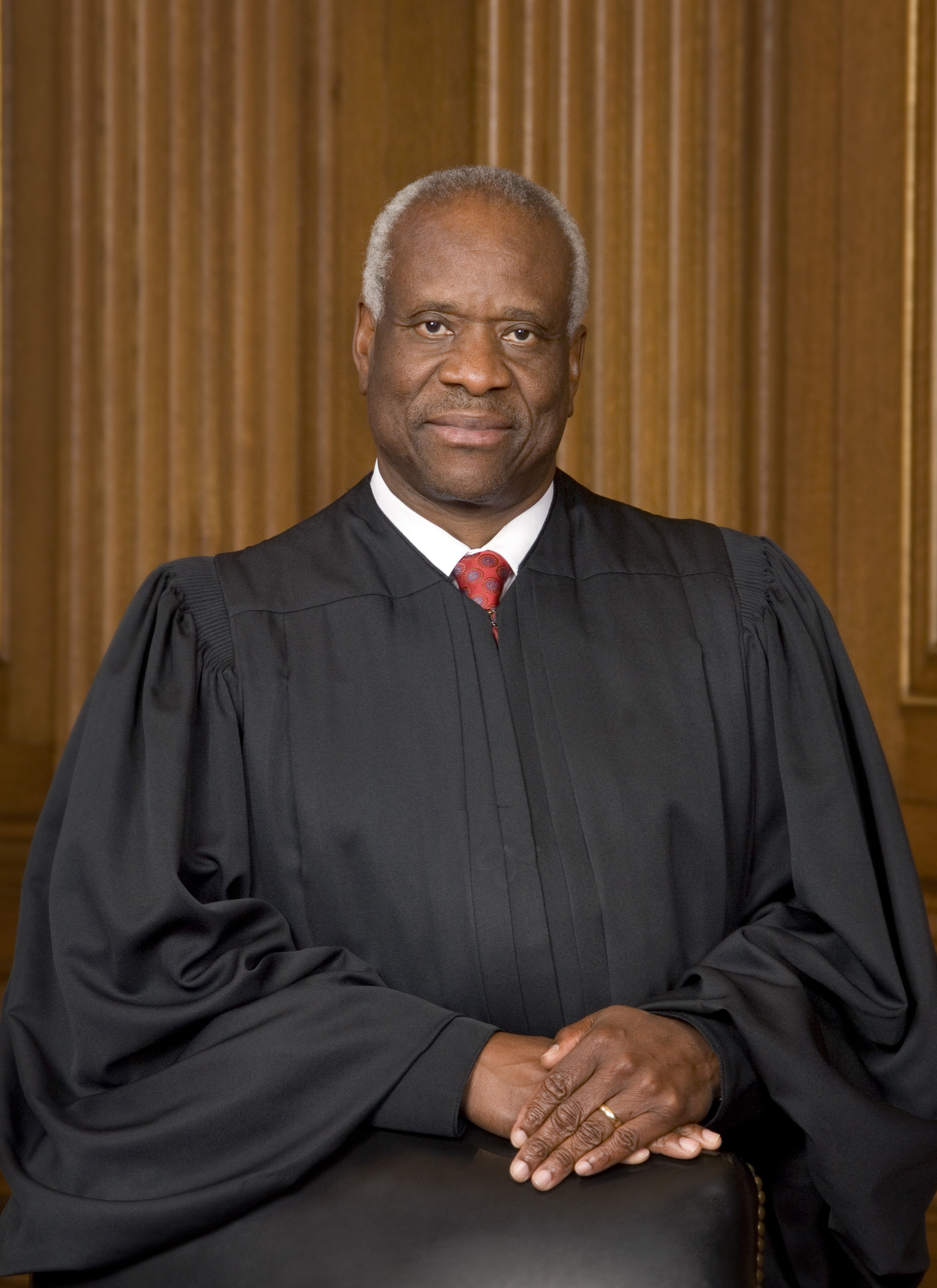

Clarence Thomas 2010 term statistics

9	Majority or plurality	8	Concurrence	0	Other
6	Dissent	0	Concurrence/dissent	Total =	23
Bench opinions = 22		Opinions relating to orders = 1		In-chambers opinions = 0
Unanimous opinions: 1		Most joined by: Scalia, Kennedy, Alito (11)		Least joined by: Kagan (1)

Type	Case	Citation	Issues	Joined by	Other opinions
	NASA v. Nelson	562 U.S. 134 (2011)	background check of prospective federal employees • informational privacy • Privacy Act of 1974		Alito; Scalia
	Ortiz v. Jordan	562 U.S. 180 (2011)	Federal Rules of Civil Procedure • appealability of denial of summary judgment motion after trial on the merits • qualified immunity • post-trial judicial review of sufficiency of the evidence	Scalia, Kennedy	Ginsburg
	CSX Transportation, Inc. v. Alabama Dept. of Revenue	562 U.S. 277 (2011)	Railroad Revitalization and Regulatory Reform Act of 1976 • tax discrimination against rail carrier	Ginsburg	Kagan
	Williamson v. Mazda Motor of America, Inc.	562 U.S. 323 (2011)	National Traffic and Motor Vehicle Safety Act of 1966 • Federal Motor Vehicle Safety Standards on seat belt design • state law torts against auto manufacturers • federal preemption		Breyer; Sotomayor
	Michigan v. Bryant	562 U.S. 344 (2011)	Sixth Amendment • Confrontation Clause • hearsay exception for statements to help police address ongoing emergency		Sotomayor; Scalia; Ginsburg
	Pepper v. United States	562 U.S. 476 (2011)	Federal Sentencing Guidelines • consideration of postsentencing rehabilitation		Sotomayor; Breyer; Alito
	Skinner v. Switzer	562 U.S. 521 (2011)	postconviction access to DNA testing • Section 1983 • Rooker–Feldman doctrine	Kennedy, Alito	Ginsburg
	Alderman v. United States • [full text]	562 U.S. 1163 (2011)	Commerce Clause • James Guelff and Chris McCurley Body Armor Act of 2002	Scalia (in part)	
Thomas dissented from the Court's denial of certiorari, in a case involving whether a federal law against felons possessing body armor was constitutional after United States v. Lopez, 514 U.S. 549 (1995), which was the first Supreme Court case since the New Deal to set limits upon Congress's Commerce Clause power. The lower court's opinion held, on the basis of an older case, Scarborough v. United States, 431 U. S. 563 (1977), that the federal law was presumptively constitutional and that it was therefore not subject to the three-part test established in Lopez for analyzing whether a federal law exceeded Commerce Clause powers. In his dissent, Thomas complained that the Court, in its refusal to review the lower court's decision, "tacitly accepts the nullification of our recent Commerce Clause jurisprudence."
	Connick v. Thompson	563 U.S. 51 (2011)	single violation as basis for Section 1983 claim • failure to make Brady disclosure • failure to train prosecutors	Roberts, Scalia, Kennedy, Alito	Scalia; Ginsburg
	Cullen v. Pinholster	563 U.S. 170 (2011)	Antiterrorism and Effective Death Penalty Act of 1996 • introduction of new evidence in habeas corpus proceedings • Sixth Amendment • ineffective assistance of counsel	Roberts, Scalia, Kennedy; Ginsburg, Breyer, Alito, Kagan	Alito; Breyer; Sotomayor
	Sossamon v. Texas	563 U.S. 277 (2011)	prisoners' rights • Religious Land Use and Institutionalized Persons Act • Spending Clause • sovereign immunity	Roberts, Scalia, Kennedy, Ginsburg, Alito	Sotomayor
	AT&T Mobility LLC v. Concepcion	563 U.S. 333 (2011)	Federal Arbitration Act • federal preemption • class actions		Scalia; Breyer
	Montana v. Wyoming	563 U.S. 368 (2011)	Yellowstone River Compact • water law • change in irrigation methods reducing downstream flow • doctrine of appropriation • doctrine of recapture	Roberts, Kennedy, Ginsburg, Breyer, Alito, Sotomayor	Scalia
	Schindler Elevator Corp. v. United States ex rel. Kirk	563 U.S. 401 (2011)	False Claims Act • bar on qui tam suits based on public disclosures • Freedom of Information Act responses	Roberts, Scalia, Kennedy, Alito	Ginsburg
	McNeill v. United States	563 U.S. 816 (2011)	Armed Career Criminal Act • sentencing enhancement for prior serious drug offense convictions	Unanimous	
	Sykes v. United States	564 U.S. 1 (2011)	Armed Career Criminal Act • felony vehicle flight as predicate offense under residual clause		Kennedy; Scalia; Kagan
	Talk America, Inc. v. Michigan Bell Telephone Co.	564 U.S. 50 (2011)	Telecommunications Act of 1996 • incumbent local exchange carrier interconnection duty • entrance facility as part of network	Roberts, Scalia, Kennedy, Ginsburg, Breyer, Alito, Sotomayor	Scalia
	Microsoft Corp. v. i4i Ltd. Partnership	564 U.S. 91 (2011)	Patent Act of 1952 • presumption of patent validity • on-sale bar • clear and convincing evidence		Sotomayor; Breyer
	Janus Capital Group, Inc. v. First Derivative Traders	564 U.S. 135 (2011)	SEC Rule 10b-5 • participation of corporate affiliate in making false statements	Roberts, Scalia, Kennedy, Alito	Breyer
	Borough of Duryea v. Guarnieri	564 U.S. 379 (2011)	employer retaliation • First Amendment • public employee speech • Petition Clause		Kennedy; Scalia
	Turner v. Rogers	564 U.S. 431 (2011)	Due Process Clause • right to counsel in civil contempt hearing for indigent defendant facing incarceration	Scalia; Roberts, Alito (in part)	Breyer
	PLIVA, Inc. v. Mensing	564 U.S. 604 (2011)	federal generic drug labeling requirements • federal preemption	Roberts, Scalia, Alito; Kennedy (part)	Sotomayor
	Brown v. Entertainment Merchants Assn.	564 U.S. 786 (2011)	First Amendment • freedom of speech • restriction on sale of violent video games to minors		Scalia; Alito; Breyer
