= 2010 term United States Supreme Court opinions of Stephen Breyer =

The 2010 term of the Supreme Court of the United States began October 4, 2010, and concluded October 1, 2011. This was the seventeenth term of Associate Justice Stephen Breyer's tenure on the Court.
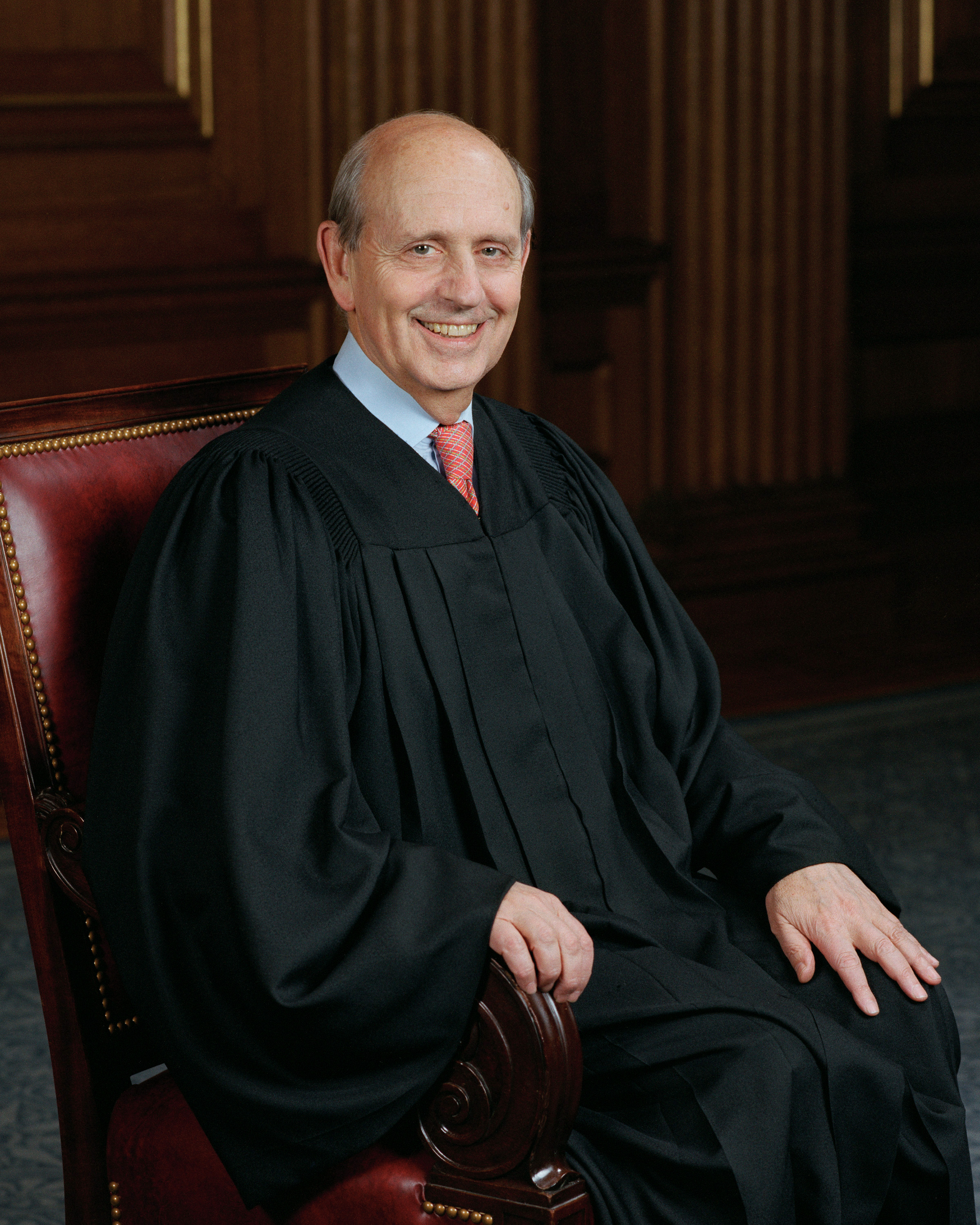

Stephen Breyer 2010 term statistics

7	Majority or plurality	5	Concurrence	1	Other
11	Dissent	1	Concurrence/dissent	Total =	25
Bench opinions = 23		Opinions relating to orders = 2		In-chambers opinions = 0
Unanimous opinions: 0		Most joined by: Ginsburg (15)		Least joined by: Thomas (3)

Type	Case	Citation	Issues	Joined by	Other opinions
	Los Angeles County v. Humphries • [full text]	562 U.S. 29 (2010)	42 U.S.C. § 1983 • "policy or custom" liability requirement • damages	Roberts, Scalia, Kennedy, Thomas, Ginsburg, Alito, Sotomayor	
Breyer's 8-0 opinion held that a municipality can only be liable under 42 U.S.C. § 1983 for an injury caused by that municipality's own "policy or custom", regardless of whether the plaintiff seeks prospective relief or monetary damages.
	Bruesewitz v. Wyeth LLC	562 U.S. 223 (2011)	National Childhood Vaccine Injury Act of 1986 • state law design defect claims • federal preemption		Scalia; Sotomayor
	Williamson v. Mazda Motor of America, Inc.	562 U.S. 323 (2011)	National Traffic and Motor Vehicle Safety Act of 1966 • Federal Motor Vehicle Safety Standards on seat belt design • state law torts against auto manufacturers • federal preemption	Roberts, Scalia, Kennedy, Ginsburg, Alito, Sotomayor	Thomas; Sotomayor
	Snyder v. Phelps	562 U.S. 443 (2011)	First Amendment • free speech • intentional infliction of emotional distress		Roberts; Alito
	Pepper v. United States	562 U.S. 476 (2011)	Federal Sentencing Guidelines • consideration of postsentencing rehabilitation		Sotomayor; Alito; Thomas
	Milner v. Department of Navy	562 U.S. 562 (2011)	Freedom of Information Act • exemption for internal personnel rules		Kagan; Alito
	Kasten v. Saint-Gobain Performance Plastics Corp.	563 U.S. 1 (2011)	Fair Labor Standards Act of 1938 • antiretaliation provision • oral intracompany complaints	Roberts, Kennedy, Ginsburg, Alito, Sotomayor	Scalia
	Cullen v. Pinholster	563 U.S. 170 (2011)	Antiterrorism and Effective Death Penalty Act of 1996 • introduction of new evidence in habeas corpus proceedings • Sixth Amendment • ineffective assistance of counsel		Thomas; Alito; Sotomayor
	AT&T Mobility LLC v. Concepcion	563 U.S. 333 (2011)	Federal Arbitration Act • federal preemption • class actions	Ginsburg, Sotomayor, Kagan	Scalia; Thomas
	CIGNA Corp. v. Amara	563 U.S. 421 (2011)	ERISA • failure to provide proper notice of plan changes • court authority to reform plan as equitable relief	Roberts, Kennedy, Ginsburg, Alito, Kagan	Scalia
	Chamber of Commerce of United States of America v. Whiting	563 U.S. 582 (2011)	Immigration Reform and Control Act • Legal Arizona Workers Act • state requirement that businesses use E-Verify • suspension or revocation of business licenses for hiring unauthorized aliens • federal preemption	Ginsburg	Roberts; Sotomayor
	United States v. Tinklenberg	563 U.S. 647 (2011)	Speedy Trial Act of 1974 • effect of pretrial motions on delay	Kennedy, Ginsburg, Alito, Sotomayor; Roberts, Scalia, Thomas (in part)	Scalia
	Fowler v. United States	563 U.S. 668 (2011)	federal witness tampering crime • likelihood victim was intending to communicate with federal officer	Roberts, Kennedy, Thomas, Sotomayor, Kagan	Scalia; Alito
	Board of Trustees of Leland Stanford Junior Univ. v. Roche Molecular Systems, Inc.	563 U.S. 776 (2011)	patent law • University and Small Business Patent Procedures Act of 1980 • vesting of federally funded patents in inventors or contractors	Ginsburg	Roberts; Sotomayor
	Kiyemba v. Obama	563 U.S. 954 (2011)	Guantanamo Bay detainees	Kennedy, Ginsburg, Sotomayor	
Breyer filed a statement respecting the Court's denial of certiorari.
	Microsoft Corp. v. i4i Ltd. Partnership	564 U.S. 91 (2011)	Patent Act of 1952 • presumption of patent validity • on-sale bar • clear and convincing evidence	Scalia, Alito	Sotomayor; Thomas
	Janus Capital Group, Inc. v. First Derivative Traders	564 U.S. 135 (2011)	SEC Rule 10b-5 • participation of corporate affiliate in making false statements	Ginsburg, Sotomayor, Kagan	Thomas
	Davis v. United States	564 U.S. 229 (2011)	Fourth Amendment • exclusionary rule • good faith reliance on binding appellate precedent	Ginsburg	Alito; Sotomayor
	Turner v. Rogers	564 U.S. 431 (2011)	Due Process Clause • right to counsel in civil contempt hearing for indigent defendant facing incarceration	Kennedy, Ginsburg, Sotomayor, Kagan	Thomas
	Stern v. Marshall	564 U.S. 462 (2011)	Article III • bankruptcy court authority to decide state law counterclaim	Ginsburg, Sotomayor, Kagan	Roberts; Scalia
	Sorrell v. IMS Health Inc.	564 U.S. 552 (2011)	state law restrictions on sale or disclosure of drug prescriber information • First Amendment • free speech	Ginsburg, Kagan	Kennedy
	Brown v. Entertainment Merchants Assn.	564 U.S. 786 (2011)	First Amendment • freedom of speech • restriction on sale of violent video games to minors		Scalia; Alito; Thomas
	J. McIntyre Machinery, Ltd. v. Nicastro	564 U.S. 873 (2011)	Fourteenth Amendment • Due Process Clause • personal jurisdiction over foreign manufacturer in state product liability suit • purposeful availment of the forum	Alito	Kennedy; Ginsburg
	Leal Garcia v. Texas	564 U.S. 940 (2011)	Vienna Convention on Consular Relations • domestication of international law • due process	Ginsburg, Sotomayor, Kagan	per curiam
Breyer dissented from the Court's denial of a stay of execution
	Valle v. Florida	564 U.S. 1067 (2011)	Eighth Amendment • death penalty		
Breyer dissented from the Court's denial of stay, in a case arguing that executing the petitioner after he spent 33 years on death row constitutes cruel and unusual punishment.
