= 2010 term United States Supreme Court opinions of Samuel Alito =

The 2010 term of the Supreme Court of the United States began October 4, 2010, and concluded October 1, 2011. This was the sixth term of Associate Justice Samuel Alito's tenure on the Court.
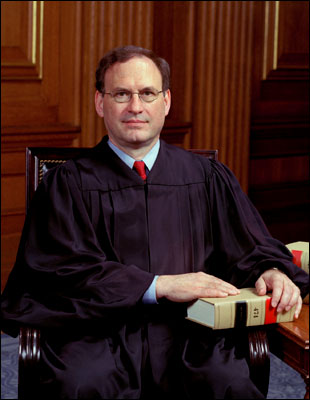

Samuel Alito 2010 term statistics

7	Majority or plurality	6	Concurrence	1	Other
6	Dissent	1	Concurrence/dissent	Total =	21
Bench opinions = 18		Opinions relating to orders = 3		In-chambers opinions = 0
Unanimous opinions: 0		Most joined by: Roberts (12)		Least joined by: Kagan (4)

Type	Case	Citation	Issues	Joined by	Other opinions
	NASA v. Nelson	562 U.S. 134 (2011)	background check of prospective federal employees • informational privacy • Privacy Act of 1974	Roberts, Kennedy, Ginsburg, Breyer, Sotomayor	Scalia; Thomas
	Staub v. Proctor Hospital	562 U.S. 411 (2011)	Uniformed Services Employment and Reemployment Rights Act of 1994 • influence of prior discrimination on subsequent decisionmaker	Thomas	Scalia
	Henderson v. Shinseki	562 U.S. 428 (2011)	Veterans' Judicial Review Act • Court of Appeals for Veterans Claims • excusability of missing deadline for filing appeal	Roberts, Scalia, Kennedy, Thomas, Ginsburg, Breyer, Sotomayor	
	Snyder v. Phelps	562 U.S. 443 (2011)	First Amendment • free speech • intentional infliction of emotional distress		Roberts; Breyer
	Pepper v. United States	562 U.S. 476 (2011)	Federal Sentencing Guidelines • consideration of postsentencing rehabilitation		Sotomayor; Breyer; Thomas
	Wall v. Kholi	562 U.S. 545 (2011)	Antiterrorism and Effective Death Penalty Act of 1996 • tolling of habeas corpus statute of limitations • motion to reduce sentence as application for collateral review	Roberts, Kennedy, Thomas, Ginsburg, Breyer, Sotomayor, Kagan; Scalia (in part)	Scalia
	Milner v. Department of Navy	562 U.S. 562 (2011)	Freedom of Information Act • exemption for internal personnel rules		Kagan; Breyer
	Wong v. Smith • [full text]	562 U.S. 1021 (2010)	judicial commenting on evidence • judicial coercion of a jury verdict	Roberts, Scalia	
Alito filed a dissent from the Court's denial of certiorari, where the lower court had granted habeas relief on the grounds that a judge's comments to a deadlocked jury about the evidence coerced them into returning a guilty verdict. Alito observed that the privilege of common law judges to comment on the evidence was centuries old, and no Supreme Court precedent had yet ruled on whether or when the exercise of that privilege constituted coercion. In Alito's view, therefore, the lower court's judgment was contrary to the requirement under the Antiterrorism and Effective Death Penalty Act that a state court judgment must be contrary to clearly established law in order to be set aside by a federal habeas court.
	Harper v. Maverick Recording Co. • [full text]	562 U.S. 1080 (2010)	copyright infringement • statutory damages • innocent infringer defense • music downloading		
Alito filed a dissent from the Court's denial of certiorari, in a case involving a 16-year-old girl sued for illegally downloading music from the internet. The lower court had ruled the girl was ineligible for the "innocent infringer" defense, which would have reduced the statutory damages available, because it was foreclosed by 17 U.S.C. § 402(d), which applies when the defendant had access to a "phonorecord" bearing a copyright notice. Alito noted that the statutory definition of "phonorecord" only applied to material objects, and so there was a "strong argument" that §402(d) did not apply to downloaded digital music files. Though there was not yet a circuit split on the issue, Alito believed certiorari was appropriate because the issue was important and unlikely to be presented to the courts of appeals in many cases.
	Huber v. New Jersey Dept. of Environmental Protection	562 U.S. 1302 (2011)	Fourth Amendment • warrantless searches • wetlands protection	Roberts, Scalia, Thomas	
Alito filed a statement respecting the Court's denial of certiorari.
	Cullen v. Pinholster	563 U.S. 170 (2011)	Antiterrorism and Effective Death Penalty Act of 1996 • introduction of new evidence in habeas corpus proceedings • Sixth Amendment • ineffective assistance of counsel		Thomas; Breyer; Sotomayor
	Kentucky v. King	563 U.S. 452 (2011)	Fourth Amendment • exigent circumstances • police-created exigency	Roberts, Scalia, Kennedy, Thomas, Breyer, Sotomayor, Kagan	Ginsburg
	Brown v. Plata	563 U.S. 493 (2011)	Prison Litigation Reform Act of 1995 • Eighth Amendment • prison overcrowding	Roberts	Kennedy; Scalia
	Fowler v. United States	563 U.S. 668 (2011)	federal witness tampering crime • likelihood victim was intending to communicate with federal officer	Ginsburg	Breyer; Scalia
	Global-Tech Appliances, Inc. v. SEB S. A.	563 U.S. 754 (2011)	patent law • induced infringement • willful blindness	Roberts, Scalia, Thomas, Ginsburg, Breyer, Sotomayor, Kagan	Kennedy
	Nevada Comm'n on Ethics v. Carrigan	564 U.S. 117 (2011)	vote recusal of state legislator with conflict of interest • First Amendment • overbreadth doctrine		Scalia; Kennedy
	United States v. Jicarilla Apache Nation	564 U.S. 162 (2011)	fiduciary exception to attorney–client privilege • general trust relationship between the United States and Indian tribes	Roberts, Scalia, Kennedy, Thomas	Ginsburg; Sotomayor
	Davis v. United States	564 U.S. 229 (2011)	Fourth Amendment • exclusionary rule • good faith reliance on binding appellate precedent	Roberts, Scalia, Kennedy, Thomas, Kagan	Sotomayor; Breyer
	J. D. B. v. North Carolina	564 U.S. 261 (2011)	Fifth Amendment • Miranda warning • effect of minor's age on determining custodial status	Roberts, Scalia, Thomas	Sotomayor
	American Elec. Power Co. v. Connecticut	564 U.S. 410 (2011)	Clean Air Act • power plant carbon dioxide emissions standards • federal common law nuisance claims	Thomas	Ginsburg
	Brown v. Entertainment Merchants Assn.	564 U.S. 786 (2011)	First Amendment • freedom of speech • restriction on sale of violent video games to minors	Roberts	Scalia; Thomas; Breyer
