= 2010 term United States Supreme Court opinions of Anthony Kennedy =

The 2010 term of the Supreme Court of the United States began October 4, 2010, and concluded October 1, 2011. This was the twenty-fourth term of Associate Justice Anthony Kennedy's tenure on the Court.
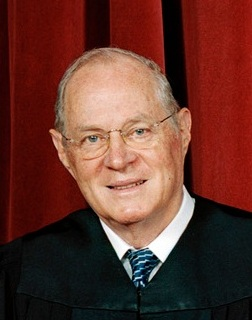

Anthony Kennedy 2010 term statistics

11	Majority or plurality	3	Concurrence	0	Other
3	Dissent	0	Concurrence/dissent	Total =	17
Bench opinions = 17		Opinions relating to orders = 0		In-chambers opinions = 0
Unanimous opinions: 1		Most joined by: Roberts (10)		Least joined by: Kagan (4)

Type	Case	Citation	Issues	Joined by	Other opinions
	Harrington v. Richter	562 U.S. 86 (2010)	Antiterrorism and Effective Death Penalty Act of 1996 • habeas corpus • bar against relitigating claims • presumption of state court adjudication on merits • Sixth Amendment • ineffective assistance of counsel	Roberts, Scalia, Thomas, Breyer, Alito, Sotomayor	Ginsburg
	Premo v. Moore	562 U.S. 115 (2010)	Sixth Amendment • ineffective assistance of counsel	Roberts, Scalia, Thomas, Breyer, Alito, Sotomayor	Ginsburg
	Arizona Christian School Tuition Organization v. Winn	563 U.S. 125 (2011)	First Amendment • Establishment Clause • taxpayer standing	Roberts, Scalia, Thomas, Alito	Scalia; Kagan
	Virginia Office for Protection and Advocacy v. Stewart	563 U.S. 247 (2011)	Eleventh Amendment • sovereign immunity • federal action by state agency against state officials for federal law violation • Supremacy Clause • Developmental Disabilities Assistance and Bill of Rights Act of 2000 • Protection and Advocacy for Individuals with Mental Illness Act	Thomas	Scalia; Roberts
	United States v. Tohono O'odham Nation	563 U.S. 307 (2011)	Court of Federal Claims jurisdiction • separate suits based on same operative facts	Roberts, Scalia, Thomas, Alito	Sotomayor; Ginsburg
	Brown v. Plata	563 U.S. 493 (2011)	Prison Litigation Reform Act of 1995 • Eighth Amendment • prison overcrowding	Ginsburg, Breyer, Sotomayor, Kagan	Scalia; Alito
	Camreta v. Greene	563 U.S. 692 (2011)	Article III • Case or Controversy Clause • standing • review of constitutional issue on appeal from defendant with qualified immunity • mootness	Thomas	Kagan; Scalia; Sotomayor
	Ashcroft v. al-Kidd	563 U.S. 731 (2011)	material witness arrest of terrorism suspects • pretextual motivation • Fourth Amendment • qualified immunity	Ginsburg, Breyer, Sotomayor (in part)	Scalia; Ginsburg; Sotomayor
	Global-Tech Appliances, Inc. v. SEB S. A.	563 U.S. 754 (2011)	patent law • induced infringement • willful blindness		Alito
	Sykes v. United States	564 U.S. 1 (2011)	Armed Career Criminal Act • felony vehicle flight as predicate offense under residual clause	Roberts, Breyer, Alito, Sotomayor	Thomas; Scalia; Kagan
	Nevada Comm'n on Ethics v. Carrigan	564 U.S. 117 (2011)	vote recusal of state legislator with conflict of interest • First Amendment • overbreadth doctrine		Scalia; Alito
	Bond v. United States	564 U.S. 211 (2011)	Article III • standing • Chemical Weapons Convention Implementation Act of 1998 • Tenth Amendment	Unanimous	Ginsburg
	Borough of Duryea v. Guarnieri	564 U.S. 379 (2011)	employer retaliation • First Amendment • public employee speech • Petition Clause • public concern doctrine	Roberts, Ginsburg, Breyer, Alito, Sotomayor, Kagan	Thomas; Scalia
	Freeman v. United States	564 U.S. 522 (2011)	Sentencing Reform Act of 1984 • sentence reduction due to retroactive amendment of Sentencing Guidelines • plea bargain under Federal Rule of Criminal Procedure 11	Ginsburg, Breyer, Kagan	Sotomayor; Roberts
	Sorrell v. IMS Health Inc.	564 U.S. 552 (2011)	state law restrictions on sale or disclosure of drug prescriber information • First Amendment • free speech	Roberts, Scalia, Thomas, Alito, Sotomayor	Breyer
	Bullcoming v. New Mexico	564 U.S. 647 (2011)	Sixth Amendment • Confrontation Clause • forensic laboratory report as testimony	Roberts, Breyer, Alito	Ginsburg; Sotomayor
	J. McIntyre Machinery, Ltd. v. Nicastro	564 U.S. 873 (2011)	Fourteenth Amendment • Due Process Clause • personal jurisdiction over foreign manufacturer in state product liability suit • purposeful availment of the forum	Roberts, Scalia, Thomas	Breyer; Ginsburg
