= 2010 term United States Supreme Court opinions of Ruth Bader Ginsburg =

The 2010 term of the Supreme Court of the United States began October 4, 2010, and concluded October 1, 2011. This was the eighteenth term of Associate Justice Ruth Bader Ginsburg's tenure on the Court.
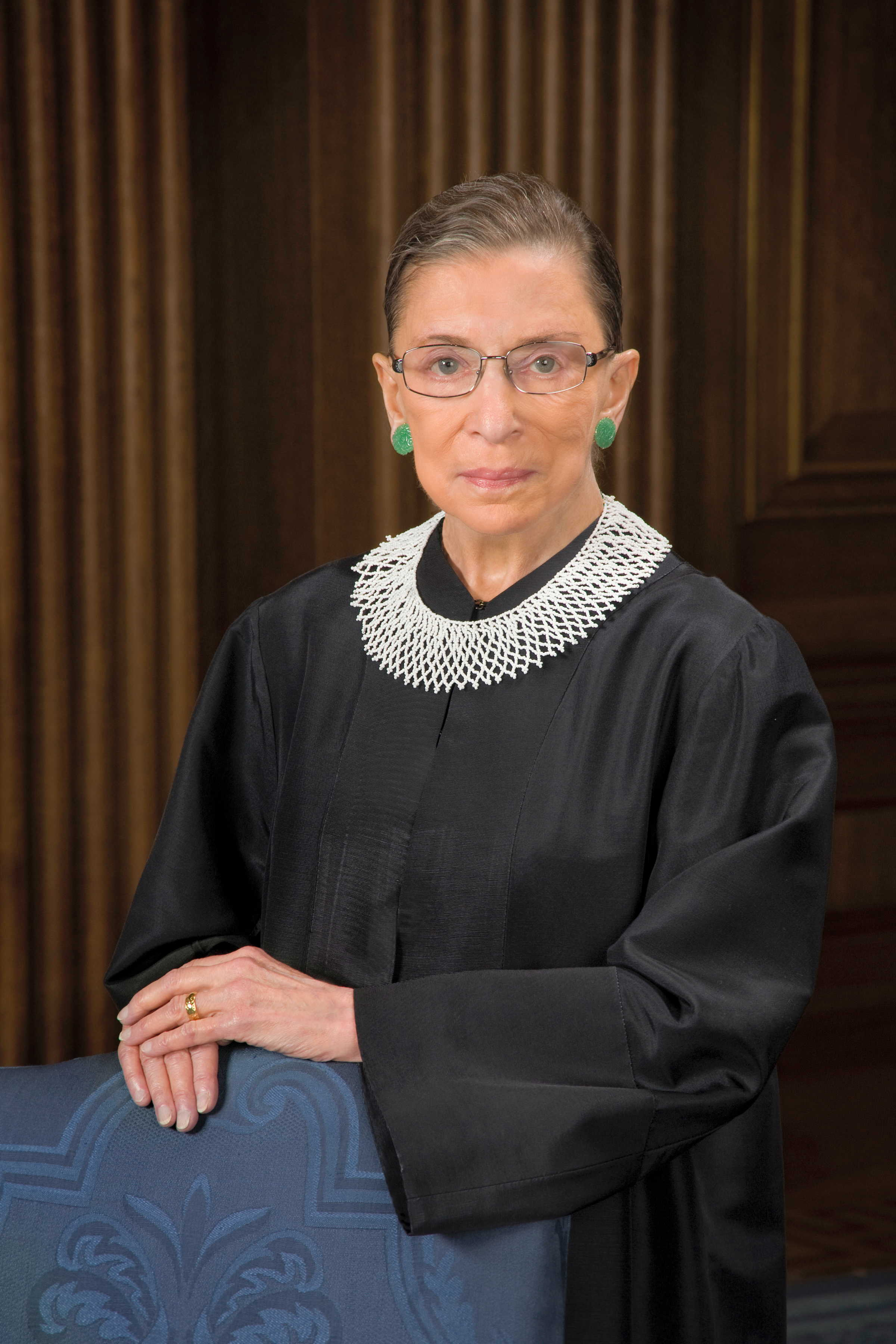

Ruth Bader Ginsburg 2010 term statistics

9	Majority or plurality	7	Concurrence	0	Other
7	Dissent	1	Concurrence/dissent	Total =	24
Bench opinions = 23		Opinions relating to orders = 1		In-chambers opinions = 0
Unanimous opinions: 2		Most joined by: Breyer (15)		Least joined by: Kennedy, Thomas (6)

Type	Case	Citation	Issues	Joined by	Other opinions
	Abbott v. United States • [full text]	562 U.S. 8 (2010)	federal criminal law • mandatory sentencing • statutory interpretation • gun laws	Roberts, Scalia, Kennedy, Thomas, Breyer, Alito, Sotomayor	
Ginsburg's opinion for the Court ruled that 18 U.S.C. § 924(c), which required a minimum five-year prison sentence for the involvement of a deadly weapon in federal drug trafficking or violent offenses, was to be imposed in addition to any other mandatory sentence given for another crime, including the underlying offense. The only exception to the five-year addition applied only when another provision required a longer mandatory term for conduct violating §924(c) specifically, rather than a mandatory sentence for another crime as the defendants had unsuccessfully argued.
	Harrington v. Richter	562 U.S. 86 (2010)	Antiterrorism and Effective Death Penalty Act of 1996 • habeas corpus • bar against relitigating claims • presumption of state court adjudication on merits • Sixth Amendment • ineffective assistance of counsel		Kennedy
	Premo v. Moore	562 U.S. 115 (2010)	Sixth Amendment • ineffective assistance of counsel		Kennedy
	Thompson v. North American Stainless, LP	562 U.S. 170 (2011)	Title VII • employer retaliation against third-party	Breyer	Scalia
	Ortiz v. Jordan	562 U.S. 180 (2011)	Federal Rules of Civil Procedure • appealability of denial of summary judgment motion after trial on the merits • qualified immunity • post-trial judicial review of sufficiency of the evidence	Roberts, Breyer, Alito, Sotomayor, Kagan	Thomas
	Swarthout v. Cooke	562 U.S. 216 (2011)	Due Process Clause • denial of parole		per curiam
	Walker v. Martin	562 U.S. 307 (2011)	habeas corpus • independent and adequate state procedural ground as basis for state judgment	Unanimous	
	Michigan v. Bryant	562 U.S. 344 (2011)	Sixth Amendment • Confrontation Clause • hearsay exception for statements to help police address ongoing emergency		Sotomayor; Thomas; Scalia
	Skinner v. Switzer	562 U.S. 521 (2011)	postconviction access to DNA testing • Section 1983 • Rooker–Feldman doctrine	Roberts, Scalia, Breyer, Sotomayor, Kagan	Thomas
	Weise v. Casper • [full text]	562 U.S. 976 (2010)	First Amendment • free speech • qualified immunity	Sotomayor	
Ginsburg filed a dissent from the Court's denial of certiorari. The plaintiffs had been ejected by volunteers, acting at the behest of the government, from a public speech by President George W. Bush because of an anti-war bumper sticker on the plaintiffs' car. The lower court ruled that the volunteers were entitled to qualified immunity because "no specific [judicial] authority" had given instructions on how to address the specific issue. Ginsburg wrote that the ejection was unreasonable and no "specific authority" should have been needed despite the novel facts of the case, because the Court's jurisprudence was quite clear that a benefit (access to the speech) could not be withheld on the basis of protected speech (the political bumper sticker). Ginsburg thought the volunteer status of the respondents in this appeal may have had some bearing on the Court's decision not to review the case, because the Volunteer Protection Act of 1997 may have shielded them from suit (although that was not the basis of the lower court's ruling). The lawsuit remained pending below against the government officials responsible for the plaintiffs' removal. Further reading: Liptak, Adam (October 12, 2010), "Justices Turn Down Appeal Over Speech Ejections", The New York Times.
	Connick v. Thompson	563 U.S. 51 (2011)	single violation as basis for Section 1983 claim • failure to make Brady disclosure • failure to train prosecutors	Breyer, Sotomayor, Kagan	Thomas; Scalia
	Astra USA, Inc. v. Santa Clara County	563 U.S. 110 (2011)	Public Health Service Act • price ceilings on pharmaceuticals sold to certain health care providers • provider cause of action for violation	Roberts, Scalia, Kennedy, Thomas, Breyer, Alito, Sotomayor	
	United States v. Tohono O'odham Nation	563 U.S. 307 (2011)	Court of Federal Claims jurisdiction • separate suits based on same operative facts		Kennedy; Sotomayor
	Schindler Elevator Corp. v. United States ex rel. Kirk	563 U.S. 401 (2011)	False Claims Act • bar on qui tam suits based on public disclosures • Freedom of Information Act responses	Breyer, Sotomayor	Thomas
	Kentucky v. King	563 U.S. 452 (2011)	Fourth Amendment • exigent circumstances • police-created exigency		Alito
	Ashcroft v. al-Kidd	563 U.S. 731 (2011)	material witness arrest of terrorism suspects • pretextual motivation • Fourth Amendment • qualified immunity	Breyer, Sotomayor	Scalia; Kennedy; Sotomayor
	United States v. Jicarilla Apache Nation	564 U.S. 162 (2011)	fiduciary exception to attorney–client privilege • general trust relationship between the United States and Indian tribes	Breyer	Alito; Sotomayor
	Bond v. United States	564 U.S. 211 (2011)	Article III • standing • Chemical Weapons Convention Implementation Act of 1998 • Tenth Amendment	Breyer	Kennedy
	Wal-Mart Stores, Inc. v. Dukes	564 U.S. 338 (2011)	Title VII • class certification	Breyer, Sotomayor Kagan	Scalia
	American Elec. Power Co. v. Connecticut	564 U.S. 410 (2011)	Clean Air Act • power plant carbon dioxide emissions standards • federal common law nuisance claims	Roberts, Scalia, Kennedy, Breyer, Kagan	Alito
	Bullcoming v. New Mexico	564 U.S. 647 (2011)	Sixth Amendment • Confrontation Clause • forensic laboratory report as testimony	Scalia; Thomas, Sotomayor, Kagan (in part)	Sotomayor; Kennedy
	CSX Transp., Inc. v. McBride	564 U.S. 685 (2011)	Federal Employers' Liability Act • railroad causation of employee injury	Breyer, Sotomayor, Kagan; Thomas (in part)	Roberts
	J. McIntyre Machinery, Ltd. v. Nicastro	564 U.S. 873 (2011)	Fourteenth Amendment • Due Process Clause • personal jurisdiction over foreign manufacturer in state product liability suit • purposeful availment of the forum	Sotomayor, Kagan	Kennedy; Breyer
	Goodyear Dunlop Tires Operations, S. A. v. Brown	564 U.S. 915 (2011)	Fourteenth Amendment • Due Process Clause • personal jurisdiction • foreign corporation sued in domestic court	Unanimous	
