= 2010 term United States Supreme Court opinions of John Roberts =

The 2010 term of the Supreme Court of the United States began October 4, 2010, and concluded October 1, 2011. This was the sixth term of Chief Justice John Roberts's tenure on the Court.
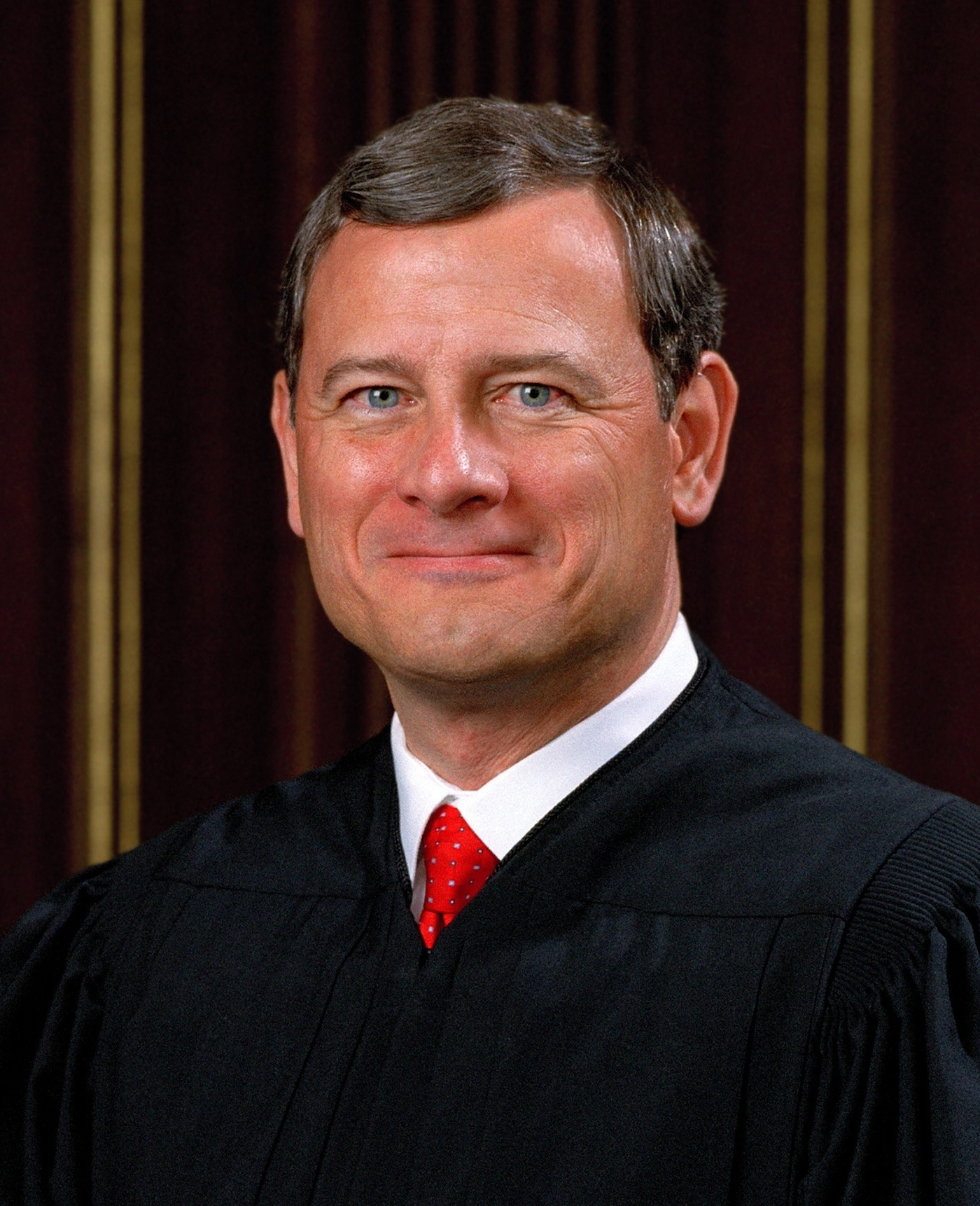

John Roberts 2010 term statistics

8	Majority or plurality	0	Concurrence	1	Other
3	Dissent	0	Concurrence/dissent	Total =	12
Bench opinions = 11		Opinions relating to orders = 0		In-chambers opinions = 1
Unanimous opinions: 1		Most joined by: Scalia, Alito (10)		Least joined by: Kagan (3)

Type	Case	Citation	Issues	Joined by	Other opinions
	Mayo Foundation for Medical Ed. and Research v. United States • [full text]	562 U.S. 44 (2011)	Social Security • Federal Insurance Contributions Act • student tax exemptions • United States administrative law • Chevron deference	Scalia, Kennedy, Thomas, Ginsburg, Breyer, Alito, Sotomayor	
Roberts' opinion for a unanimous Court upheld a regulation issued by the Treasury Department that categorically excluded those working at least 40 hours a week from eligibility for a student worker exemption from Social Security taxes. The regulation was challenged by the Mayo Foundation, which employed medical residents as part of their continuing hands-on education. The Court clarified that Chevron deference applied to the Treasury Department's regulation, notwithstanding prior decisions to the contrary that had applied a less deferential standard to tax regulations. Applying Chevron, the Court found that the statutory exemption was silent on the definition of "student" and its specific application to medical residents, which left the issue to the Treasury Department as the implementing agency, and that the full-time student regulation was a reasonable construction of the statute .
	FCC v. AT&T Inc.	562 U.S. 397 (2011)	Freedom of Information Act • applicability to corporations of personal privacy exemption	Scalia, Kennedy, Thomas, Ginsburg, Breyer, Alito, Sotomayor	
	Snyder v. Phelps	562 U.S. 443 (2011)	First Amendment • free speech • intentional infliction of emotional distress	Scalia, Kennedy, Thomas, Ginsburg, Breyer, Sotomayor, Kagan	Breyer; Alito
	Virginia Office for Protection and Advocacy v. Stewart	563 U.S. 247 (2011)	Eleventh Amendment • sovereign immunity • federal action by state agency against state officials for federal law violation • Supremacy Clause • Developmental Disabilities Assistance and Bill of Rights Act of 2000 • Protection and Advocacy for Individuals with Mental Illness Act	Alito	Scalia; Kennedy
	Chamber of Commerce of United States of America v. Whiting	563 U.S. 582 (2011)	Immigration Reform and Control Act • Legal Arizona Workers Act • state requirement that businesses use E-Verify • suspension or revocation of business licenses for hiring unauthorized aliens • federal preemption	Scalia, Kennedy, Alito; Thomas (in part)	Breyer; Sotomayor
	Board of Trustees of Leland Stanford Junior Univ. v. Roche Molecular Systems, Inc.	563 U.S. 776 (2011)	patent law • University and Small Business Patent Procedures Act of 1980 • vesting of federally funded patents in inventors or contractors	Scalia, Kennedy, Thomas, Alito, Sotomayor, Kagan	Sotomayor; Breyer
	Erica P. John Fund, Inc. v. Halliburton Co.	563 U.S. 776 (2011)	securities fraud • Securities Exchange Act of 1934 • Rule 10b-5 • class certification • loss causation	Unanimous	
	Stern v. Marshall	564 U.S. 462 (2011)	Article III • bankruptcy court authority to decide state law counterclaim	Scalia, Kennedy, Thomas, Alito	Scalia; Breyer
	Freeman v. United States	564 U.S. 522 (2011)	Sentencing Reform Act of 1984 • sentence reduction due to retroactive amendment of Sentencing Guidelines • plea bargain under Federal Rule of Criminal Procedure 11	Scalia, Thomas, Alito	Kennedy; Sotomayor
	CSX Transp., Inc. v. McBride	564 U.S. 685 (2011)	Federal Employers' Liability Act • railroad causation of employee injury	Scalia, Kennedy, Alito	Ginsburg
	Arizona Free Enterprise Club's Freedom Club PAC v. Bennett	564 U.S. 721 (2011)	campaign finance reform • matching funds provision in clean elections system • First Amendment	Scalia, Kennedy, Thomas, Alito	Kagan
	Gray v. Kelly • [full text]	564 U.S. 1301 (2011)			
Roberts denied an application for a stay. The petitioner sought certiorari of his state court conviction. The stay he sought, however, was not of the state court judgment, but of the briefing schedule entered by the district court in which he had separately initiated habeas proceedings. Roberts ruled that the petitioner had not established that he was entitled to that relief.
