= 2010 term United States Supreme Court opinions of Elena Kagan =

The 2010 term of the Supreme Court of the United States began October 4, 2010, and concluded October 1, 2011. This was the first term of Associate Justice Elena Kagan's tenure on the Court.
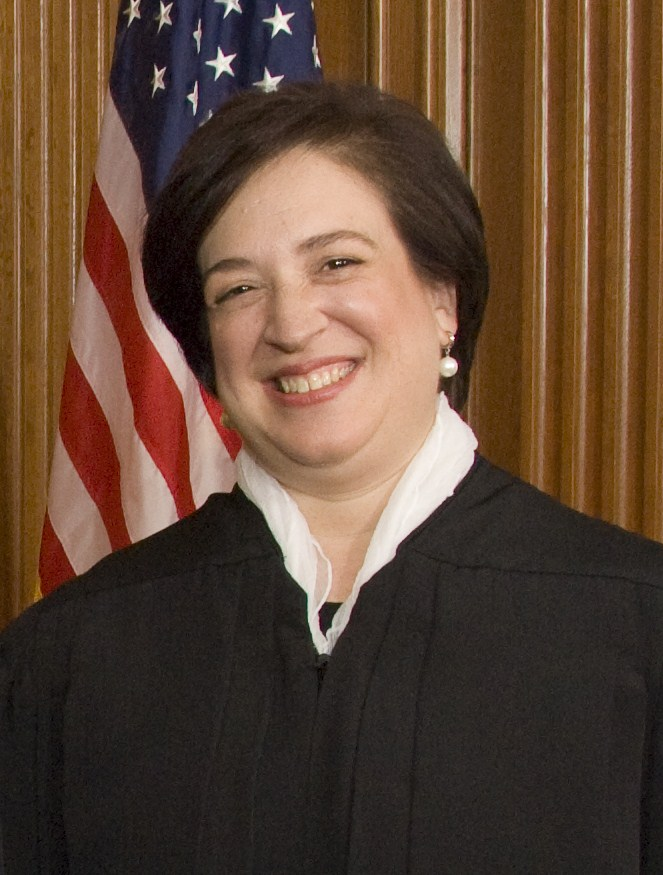

Elena Kagan 2010 term statistics

7	Majority or plurality	0	Concurrence	0	Other
3	Dissent	0	Concurrence/dissent	Total =	10
Bench opinions = 10		Opinions relating to orders = 0		In-chambers opinions = 0
Unanimous opinions: 2		Most joined by: Ginsburg (14)		Least joined by: Thomas (5)

Type	Case	Citation	Issues	Joined by	Other opinions
	Ransom v. FIA Card Services, N. A. • [full text]	562 U.S. 61 (2011)	Chapter 13 • Bankruptcy Abuse Prevention and Consumer Protection Act • means test	Roberts, Kennedy, Thomas, Ginsburg, Breyer, Alito, Sotomayor	Scalia
Kagan's opinion for the Court held that a car-ownership allowance for Chapter 13 debtors to shield an expense-related portion of their income from creditors was not available to debtors who owned their car outright and thus did not make loan or lease payments. The Court based its ruling on the statutory language that such allowances must be "applicable" to the debtor, and in its view, therefore, must relate to an expense the debtor actually has; and on commentary authored by the Internal Revenue Services that explained the cost allowance tables expressly incorporated by the statute.
	CSX Transportation, Inc. v. Alabama Dept. of Revenue	562 U.S. 277 (2011)	Railroad Revitalization and Regulatory Reform Act of 1976 • tax discrimination against rail carrier	Roberts, Scalia, Kennedy, Breyer, Alito, Sotomayor	Thomas
The Court held that CSX Transportation could sue the state over a diesel tax that applied to rail carriers, but from which interstate motor and water carriers were exempt.
	Milner v. Department of Navy	562 U.S. 562 (2011)	Freedom of Information Act • exemption for internal personnel rules	Roberts, Scalia, Kennedy, Thomas, Ginsburg, Alito, Sotomayor	Alito; Breyer
	Arizona Christian School Tuition Organization v. Winn	563 U.S. 125 (2011)	First Amendment • Establishment Clause • taxpayer standing	Ginsburg, Breyer, Sotomayor	Kennedy; Scalia
	Camreta v. Greene	563 U.S. 692 (2011)	Article III • Case or Controversy Clause • standing • review of constitutional issue on appeal from defendant with qualified immunity • mootness	Roberts, Scalia, Ginsburg, Alito	Scalia; Sotomayor; Kennedy
	Fox v. Vice	563 U.S. 826 (2011)	award of attorney's fees to prevailing defendant in case involving frivolous and nonfrivolous claims	Unanimous	
	Sykes v. United States	564 U.S. 1 (2011)	Armed Career Criminal Act • felony vehicle flight as predicate offense under residual clause	Ginsburg	Kennedy; Thomas; Scalia
	Smith v. Bayer Corp.	564 U.S. 299 (2011)	Anti-Injunction Act • relitigation exception • binding effect of denial of class action certification on nonparties	Roberts, Scalia, Kennedy, Ginsburg, Breyer, Alito, Sotomayor; Thomas (in part)	
	Tapia v. United States	564 U.S. 319 (2011)	extension of prison sentence to foster rehabilitation	Unanimous	Sotomayor
	Arizona Free Enterprise Club's Freedom Club PAC v. Bennett	564 U.S. 721 (2011)	campaign finance reform • matching funds provision in clean elections system • First Amendment	Ginsburg, Breyer, Sotomayor	Roberts
