= Yellowstone River Compact Commission =

Interstate commission

The Yellowstone River Compact Commission is an interstate commission that was created in 1950 by the ratification of the Yellowstone River Compact. The Commission was created to administer the provisions of the Compact as between the states of Montana and Wyoming, and it is composed of one representative from the state of Wyoming and one representative from the state of Montana, selected by the governors of the states, and one representative selected by the Director of the United States Geological Survey.
