= Developmentally Disabled Assistance and Bill of Rights Act =

1975 United States federal law

- Long title: Developmentally Disabled Assistance and Bill of Rights Act
- Enacted by: the 94th United States Congress

Citations
- Public law: Pub.L. 94-103

Legislative history
- Introduced in the House as H.R.4005 by Paul Rogers (D-FL) on February 27, 1975; Committee consideration by House Committee on Interstate and Foreign Commerce; Passed the House on April 10, 1975 (398-5); Passed the Senate on June 2, 1975; Signed into law by President Gerald R. Ford on October 4, 1975

The Developmentally Disabled Assistance and Bill of Rights Act is a US law providing federal funds to Councils on Developmental Disabilities, Protection and Advocacy Systems, as well as University Centers. The law defined the relatively new term "developmental disability" to include specific conditions that originate prior to age 18, are expected to continue indefinitely, and that constitute a substantial handicap. These conditions included intellectual disability, cerebral palsy, epilepsy, autism, and dyslexia.

== See also ==
- Supported employment#US Legal Basis for Supported Employment
- The Developmental Disabilities Assistance and Bill of Rights Act of 2000
