= FCC v. AT&T Inc. =

Federal Communications Commission v. AT&T Inc.
- Supreme Court of the United States

Argued January 19, 2011 Decided March 1, 2011
- Full case name: Federal Communications Commission, et al. v. AT&T Inc., et al.
- Docket no.: 09-1279
- Citations: 562 U.S. 397 (more) 131 S. Ct. 1177; 179 L. Ed. 2d 132; 2011 U.S. LEXIS 1899; 79 U.S.L.W. 4122; 39 Media L. Rep. 1368; 52 Comm. Reg. (P & F) 689; 22 Fla. L. Weekly Fed. S 825
- Argument: Oral argument

Case history
- Prior: FCC orders reviewed by 3rd Cir. and overturned, 582 F.3d 490 (3d Cir. 2009); cert. granted, 561 U.S. 1057 (2010)

Holding
- Corporations do not have "personal privacy" for the purposes of Freedom of Information Act Exemption 7(C).

Court membership
- Chief Justice John Roberts Associate Justices Antonin Scalia · Anthony Kennedy; Clarence Thomas · Ruth Bader Ginsburg; Stephen Breyer · Samuel Alito; Sonia Sotomayor · Elena Kagan

Case opinion
- Majority: Roberts, joined by Scalia, Kennedy, Thomas, Ginsburg, Breyer, Alito, Sotomayor
- Kagan took no part in the consideration or decision of the case.

Laws applied
- 5 U.S.C. § 552

Federal Communications Commission v. AT&T Inc., 562 U.S. 397 (2011), was a United States Supreme Court case on aspects of corporate personhood. It held that the exemption from Freedom of Information Act disclosure requirements for law enforcement records which "could reasonably be expected to constitute an unwarranted invasion of personal privacy" does not protect information related to corporate privacy.

== Parties ==
=== Plaintiff ===
The Federal Communications Commission (FCC) is an independent agency of the United States government. The FCC works towards six goals in the areas of competition, the public safety, broadband, spectrum, the media, and homeland security. The FCC was created by the Communications Act of 1934 as the successor to the Federal Radio Commission and they are charged with regulating all non-federal government use of the radio spectrum which includes radio and television broadcasting and all interstate telecommunications as well as all international communications that originate or terminate in the United States

=== Defendant ===
AT&T inc. is the largest provider of fixed telephony in the United States.

== Background ==
In 2004, AT&T and FCC agreed to produce an “E-Rate” program that assists schools and libraries across the US to obtain affordable telecommunications and Internet access. Later, AT&T disclosed to FCC that it might have overcharged the Government for its services. FCC started an investigation process which ended in a $500,000 settlement paid by AT&T. Many AT&T customers, represented by CompTel company, then requested FCC to make public all the pleadings and correspondences between FCC and AT&T from the investigation. AT&T, however, argued that FCC has no right to do so, referring to the Freedom of Information Act §552(b)(7)(C) which exempts records if their disclosure might lead to “an unwarranted invasion of personal privacy”. AT&T filed a case in the U.S. Court of Appeals for the Third Circuit. On September 22, 2009, the Third Circuit released its decision favoring AT&T. The court agreed that the use of word “personal” derives from a word “person”, which legally includes corporations.

=== Corporate Personhood ===
The case revived the debates over the corporate personhood. The question whether corporations should be treated as persons has been presented to the Supreme Court before. In the 1886 case Santa Clara County v. Southern Pacific Railroad, 118 U.S. 394, the Supreme Court decided that corporations could be regarded as persons for the purposes of the Fourteenth Amendment.

Another Supreme Court case related to the issue is Citizens United v. Federal Election Commission. The dispute was over whether Citizens United, a non-profit corporation, had the same right to fund political campaigns as a person. In this controversial case, the Supreme Court's 5–4 decision favored Citizen United, granting corporations, profit and non-profit, and unions the right to financially support political campaigns.

Based on these precedent cases, AT&T sued to halt the disclosure of the investigation details in order to protect the corporation's "personal privacy".

=== Personal Privacy ===
The Freedom of Information Act requires federal agencies to make records and documents publicly available upon request (subject to several statutory exemptions). It was the main component in allocations that the FCC brought against the AT&T on January 19, 2011.

§552(b)(7)(C) of FOIA states:

“(b) This section does not apply to matters that are (7) records or information compiled for law enforcement purposes, but only to the extent that the production of such law enforcement records or information (C) could reasonably be expected to constitute an unwarranted invasion of personal privacy”

The different interpretations of the term “personal privacy” became the central focus point of the case. AT&T contended that its reading of “personal” was supported by the common legal usage of the word “person.” Yet while “person,” in a legal setting, often refers to artificial entities, AT&T's effort to ascribe a corresponding legal meaning to “personal” again elided the difference between “person” and “personal.”

=== The Third Circuit Case ===
AT&T filed a lawsuit against FCC on September 22, 2009, after the latter had rejected ATT's position regarding the disclosure of investigation materials concluding that the corporations lacked the personal privacy rights. The court's decision relied heavily on the plain text of the Freedom Of Information Act, which did not define a term “personal” but included corporations in the legal definition of the term “person”. In regards to FCC Vs. ATT Inc., in the case referring to the term “personal” the Third Circuit opinion states that exemption 7(C) extends to the “personal privacy” of corporations, reasoning that “personal” is the adjective form of the term “person”, which Congress has defined, as applicable here, to include corporations. Judge Chagares of the Third Circuit concluded in the court opinion:

““Personal” is the adjectival form of “person,” and FOIA defines “person” to include a corporation. We agree. It would be very odd indeed for an adjectival form of a defined term not to refer back to that defined term”

== Supreme Court Case ==
Not content with the Third Circuit decision, FCC appealed in the Supreme Court. The case was argued on January 19, 2011. AT&T Inc. position remained the same, where it focused on the definition of the word “personal” being directly related to a legal meaning of a term “person”.

The court session opened with an announcement of the 8-0 decision by the Supreme Court in the NASA v. Nelson case, which was argued on October 5, 2010. The case's concerns were whether the background checks of NASA employees by the federal government violated their personal privacy. The Court's decision stated that such actions did not violate the employees' constitutional privacy rights. Even though the current FCC v. ATT Inc. case was focused on the different type of personal privacy involving corporations, the announcement set the tone of the Court's view on the privacy issues involving government interests.

=== Court Opinion ===
In the Supreme Court's ruling published on March 1, 2011, the definition of the term “personal” has been regarded differently. The opinion states:

“Personal” ordinarily refers to individuals. People do not generally use terms such as personal characteristics or personal correspondence to describe the characteristics or correspondence of corporations.”

Therefore, the Third Circuit ruling was reversed by the Supreme Court's decision.

In the Court's opinion, Chief Justice Roberts discussed several examples of how adjective and noun forms of the same word stem could have completely different meanings.

Adjectives typically reflect the meaning of corresponding nouns, but not always. Sometimes they acquire distinct meanings of their own. The noun "crab" refers variously to a crustacean and a type of apple, while the related adjective "crabbed" can refer to handwriting that is “difficult to read,” Webster's Third New International Dictionary 527 (2002); "corny" can mean "using familiar and stereotyped formulas believed to appeal to the unsophisticated," which has little to do with "corn" ("the seeds of any of the cereal grasses used for food"); and while "crank" is "a part of an axis bent at right angles," "cranky" can mean "given to fretful fussiness."

The Court's opinion ends with the following:

We reject the argument that because "person" is defined for purposes of FOIA to include a corporation, the phrase "personal privacy" in Exemption 7(C) reaches corporations as well. The protection in FOIA against disclosure of law enforcement information on the ground that it would constitute an unwarranted invasion of personal privacy does not extend to corporations. We trust that AT&T will not take it personally.

== Implications ==
The Supreme Court's decision struck a blow to corporate personhood and held that corporations cannot claim exempt status from Freedom of Information Act requests. The decision however is limited only to the specific exemptions under FOIA. That being said, the importance of the case on the bigger scale is that corporations lack a statute that provides personal privacy rights for them and it becomes unlikely that they will be able to get such statutory rights under state or federal statutory law.

Many conservatives see this as an effort by the left to use FOIA to control and "terrorize American businesses at will". On the other hand, businesses are expected to make a greater use of information collected from their competitors and disclosed to the public by the federal government.

== See also ==
- List of United States Supreme Court cases, volume 562
