= CSX Transportation, Inc. v. McBride =

- Supreme Court of the United States

Decided June 23, 2011
- Full case name: CSX Transportation, Inc. v. McBride
- Citations: 564 U.S. 685 (more)

Holding
- The Federal Employers Liability Act makes a railroad liable if the railroad's negligence plays any part in bringing about the injury; it does not follow proximate-cause standards developed by courts outside of statutory contexts.

Court membership
- Chief Justice John Roberts Associate Justices Antonin Scalia · Anthony Kennedy; Clarence Thomas · Ruth Bader Ginsburg; Stephen Breyer · Samuel Alito; Sonia Sotomayor · Elena Kagan

Case opinions
- Majority: Ginsburg (except Part III-A), joined by Thomas, Breyer, Sotomayor, Kagan
- Plurality: Ginsburg (Part III-A), joined by Breyer, Sotomayor, Kagan
- Dissent: Roberts, joined by Scalia, Kennedy, Alito

Laws applied
- Federal Employers Liability Act

CSX Transportation, Inc. v. McBride, 564 U.S. 685 (2011), was a United States Supreme Court case in which the court held that the Federal Employers Liability Act makes a railroad liable if the railroad's negligence plays any part in bringing about the injury; it does not follow proximate-cause standards developed by courts outside of statutory contexts.

== Background ==
Robert McBride, a locomotive engineer with CSX Transportation, Inc., an interstate railroad, sustained a debilitating hand injury while switching railroad cars. He filed suit under the Federal Employers Liability Act (FELA), which holds railroads liable for employees' injuries "resulting in whole or in part from [carrier] negligence." McBride alleged that CSX negligently (1) required him to use unsafe switching equipment and (2) failed to train him to operate that equipment. A verdict for McBride would be in order, the federal District Court instructed, if the jury found that CSX's negligence "caused or contributed to" his injury. The court declined CSX's request for additional charges requiring McBride to "show that... [CSX's] negligence was a proximate cause of the injury" and defining "proximate cause" as "any cause which, in natural or probable sequence, produced the injury complained of." Instead, relying on Rogers v. Missouri Pacific R. Co., the court gave the Seventh Circuit's pattern FELA instruction: "Defendant 'caused or contributed to' Plaintiff's injury if Defendant's negligence played a part—no matter how small—in bringing about the injury." The jury returned a verdict for McBride.

On appeal, CSX renewed its objection to the failure to instruct on proximate cause, now defining the phrase to require a "direct relation between the injury asserted and the injurious conduct alleged." The appeals court, however, approved the District Court's instruction and affirmed its judgment for McBride. Because Rogers had relaxed the proximate cause requirement in FELA cases, the court said, an instruction that simply paraphrased Rogers' language could not be declared erroneous.

== Opinion of the court ==
The Supreme Court issued an opinion on June 23, 2011.
