= Yellowstone River Compact =

American three state compact

The Yellowstone River Compact is an interstate compact that was entered into by Montana, North Dakota, and Wyoming and ratified in 1950 for the purpose of providing for an equitable division and apportionment of the waters of the Yellowstone River and its tributaries, encouraging mutually beneficial development and use of the Yellowstone River Basin's waters, and furthering intergovernment cooperation between the three states. The Compact became effective in 1951 and provided for the creation of the Yellowstone River Compact Commission to administer the provisions of the Compact as between the states of Montana and Wyoming.

== Montana v. Wyoming ==
In 2007, Montana motioned the Supreme Court of the United States for leave of Court to file a bill of complaint against Wyoming and North Dakota, claiming that Wyoming had violated the Yellowstone River Compact by permitting the citizens of Wyoming to employ more efficient irrigation systems, causing Montana to receive less run off water than the state had originally received.

When the Compact was agreed to, irrigation was accomplished mostly by flooding crop fields. Around 65% of the water would be absorbed into the soil or evaporate, leaving 35% to flow back into the source rivers and downstream. With more efficient irrigation systems, such as sprinkling, 10% or less of the water flows downstream, effectively allowing Wyoming to utilize more water. The Supreme Court granted the motion for leave of Court and appointed Stanford University natural resources law professor Bradford H. Thompson, Jr. as Special Master to try the case and recommend a decision to the Court. Special Master Thompson concluded that because the Compact did not specify a fixed volume of water from the Yellowstone River or its tributaries that would be available to Montana, Wyoming's use of more efficient irrigation methods did not violate the Compact. In the opinion for Montana v. Wyoming filed May 2, 2011, the Supreme Court agreed, holding that Montana had failed to state a claim for breach of the Compact, and that Wyoming's more efficient irrigation systems do not violate the Compact. The Supreme Court filed another brief opinion on March 21, 2016. There was another judgment and decree on February 20, 2018.
