= Skinner v. Switzer =

- Supreme Court of the United States

Argued October 13, 2010 Decided March 7, 2011
- Full case name: Henry W. Skinner v. Lynn Switzer, District Attorney
- Docket no.: 09-9000
- Citations: 562 U.S. 521 (more) 131 S. Ct. 1289; 179 L. Ed. 2d 233

Case history
- Prior: Defendant conviction affirmed, 956 S.W.2d 532 (Tex. Crim. App., 1997); federal relief denied sub nom. Skinner v. Quarterman, 2007 WL 582808 (N.D. Tex., 2007); affirmed, 576 F.3d 214 (5th Cir., 2009); additional testing request under state law denied, 122 S.W.3d 808 (Tex. Crim. App., 2003); additional motion denied, 293 S.W.3d 196 (Tex. Crim. App., 2009); affirmed, 363 Fed.Appx. 302 (5th Cir., 2010); certiorari granted, 560 U.S. 924 (2010).

Holding
- Because federal-court subject-matter jurisdiction existed over Skinner’s complaint, his claim was cognizable under §1983.

Court membership
- Chief Justice John Roberts Associate Justices Antonin Scalia · Anthony Kennedy; Clarence Thomas · Ruth Bader Ginsburg; Stephen Breyer · Samuel Alito; Sonia Sotomayor · Elena Kagan

Case opinions
- Majority: Ginsburg, joined by Roberts, Scalia, Breyer, Sotomayor, Kagan
- Dissent: Thomas, joined by Kennedy, Alito

Skinner v. Switzer, 562 U.S. 521 (2011), is a decision by the U.S. Supreme Court regarding the route through which a prisoner may obtain biological DNA material for testing to challenge his conviction; whether through a civil rights suit or a habeas corpus petition. A majority of the Court held that the civil rights path was the appropriate path.

== Background ==
Henry Skinner was convicted of murdering his girlfriend in 1995, and sentenced to death. The Texas Court of Criminal Appeals (CCA) affirmed. On March 26, 1998, Skinner filed a petition for a writ of habeas corpus in Texas courts. It was subsequently dismissed as untimely and the CCA affirmed. In 1999, he filed a federal habeas petition.

At the same time, he began pushing for DNA testing of materials in the original case by the District Attorney's office. The testing was conducted by a private office and resulted in mixed results; however Skinner wanted what he called 'independent' testing.

He filed claims in Texas court for his own DNA testing but his attempts did not succeed. He also filed a second successive federal habeas petition demanding DNA testing of all evidence; this was an independent claim as well as a basis for a claim of ineffective assistance of counsel (his attorney did not request DNA testing of certain evidence at trial). A federal magistrate held a hearing, rejected the petition, which a district judge eventually confirmed. The Fifth Circuit Court of Appeals affirmed.

Skinner filed a civil lawsuit claiming the CCA violated his due process rights. The complaint was dismissed by the federal court for being in the wrong jurisdiction (the court said this type of claim could only be pursued as in a habeas corpus action). The Supreme Court entered a stay of execution and granted a writ of certiorari to hear the case.

== Oral Arguments ==
The Court heard oral arguments on October 13, 2010. The Court focused the questioning on the boundary between habeas claims and §1983 claims (violations of civil rights). Robert C. Owen, attorney for Skinner, started by narrowing the scope of their appeal to seeking "only access to evidence for DNA testing". Justice Alito was skeptical of the path Skinner was using in order to get the DNA testing. He stated that it was just a backdoor attempt "in overturning [a prisoner's] conviction". Owen then turned to practical considerations of the case, emphasizing that there would be no flood of §1983 cases. He relied on evidence from multiple Courts of Appeal to demonstrate that no such rush would occur. As Owen concluded his argument, Chief Justice John Roberts and Justice Stephen Breyer attacked Skinner's original complaint.

After Owen concluded, Gregory S. Coleman, arguing for District Attorney Lynn Switzer, opened by stating that Skinner's case was just a Brady claim about access to material. Justice Breyer then moved the focus to the question of a substantive civil right: "what Skinner wants is the DNA. He thinks it's going to be exculpatory. He doesn't know until he gets it." Coleman still challenged whether this is the proper subject of a habeas corpus claim. Justices further questioned where the distinction between the two types of claims (civil rights violations and habeas) lay. Hypotheticals to test this distinction drew criticism from Justice Kennedy. Coleman then concluded by arguing that the only way Skinner could make a claim is to argue the DNA testing law of Texas is "unconstitutional" not a habeas claim.

== Opinion of the Court ==
In a 6 to 3 decision delivered by Justice Ruth Bader Ginsburg, the Court held that federal-court subject-matter jurisdiction existed over Skinner’s complaint, and that his claim was cognizable under §1983. Justices Thomas, Kennedy and Alito dissented.

== See also ==
- List of United States Supreme Court cases, volume 561
