= Wall v. Kholi =

- Supreme Court of the United States

Decided March 7, 2011
- Full case name: Wall v. Kholi
- Citations: 562 U.S. 545 (more)

Holding
- It is proper to toll the time available for a habeas petition upon a properly filed application for state post-conviction or other collateral review with respect to the pertinent judgment or claim.

Court membership
- Chief Justice John Roberts Associate Justices Antonin Scalia · Anthony Kennedy; Clarence Thomas · Ruth Bader Ginsburg; Stephen Breyer · Samuel Alito; Sonia Sotomayor · Elena Kagan

Case opinions
- Majority: Alito, joined by Roberts, Kennedy, Thomas, Ginsburg, Breyer, Sotomayor, Kagan; Scalia (all but Footnote 3)
- Concurrence: Scalia (in part)

Wall v. Kholi, 562 U.S. 545 (2011), was a United States Supreme Court case in which the court held that it is proper to toll the time available for a habeas petition upon a properly filed application for state post-conviction or other collateral review with respect to the pertinent judgment or claim.

== Background ==
Kholi was convicted in Rhode Island Superior Court on 10 counts of first-degree sexual assault and sentenced to consecutive life terms. His conviction became final on direct review on May 29, 1996. In addition to his direct appeal, he filed two relevant state motions. One, a May 16, 1996, motion to reduce his sentence under Rhode Island Superior Court Rule of Criminal Procedure 35, was denied. The Rhode Island Supreme Court affirmed on January 16, 1998. The second, a state post-conviction relief motion, was also denied. That decision was affirmed on December 14, 2006. When respondent filed his federal habeas petition, his conviction had been final for over 11 years. The Antiterrorism and Effective Death Penalty Act of 1996 (AEDPA) generally requires a federal petition to be filed within one year of the date on which a judgment became final, but "a properly filed application for State post-conviction or other collateral review" tolls that period. Kholi's post-conviction relief motion tolled the period for over nine years, but his Rule 35 motion must also trigger the tolling provision for his habeas petition to be timely. The federal District Court dismissed the petition as untimely, adopting the Magistrate Judge's conclusion that the Rule 35 motion was not "a properly filed application for... collateral review" under AEDPA. The First Circuit Court of Appeals reversed.

== Opinion of the court ==
The Supreme Court issued an opinion on March 7, 2011.
