= DePierre v. United States =

- Supreme Court of the United States

Argued February 28, 2011 Decided June 9, 2011
- Full case name: Frantz DePierre, Petitioner v. United States
- Docket no.: 09-1533
- Citations: 564 U.S. 70 (more) 131 S. Ct. 2225; 180 L. Ed. 2d 114
- Argument: Oral argument

Case history
- Prior: Conviction affirmed, 599 F.3d 25 (1st Cir. 2010); cert. granted, 562 U.S. ___ (2010).

Holding
- The term "cocaine base" in 21 U.S.C. § 841(b)(1) refers to cocaine in its chemically basic form.

Court membership
- Chief Justice John Roberts Associate Justices Antonin Scalia · Anthony Kennedy; Clarence Thomas · Ruth Bader Ginsburg; Stephen Breyer · Samuel Alito; Sonia Sotomayor · Elena Kagan

Case opinions
- Majority: Sotomayor, joined by Roberts, Kennedy, Thomas, Ginsburg, Breyer, Alito, Kagan; Scalia (except Part III–A)
- Concurrence: Scalia (in part)

Laws applied
- 21 U.S.C. § 841(b)(1)

DePierre v. United States, 564 U.S. 70 (2011), was a case in which the Supreme Court of the United States held that the use of the term "cocaine base" in 21 U.S.C. § 841(b)(1) refers to cocaine in its chemically basic form. The decision of the Court was unanimous, except with respect to Part III–A.

== Background ==
A federal court found Frantz DePierre guilty of distributing cocaine in April 2008. Additionally, DePierre was found guilty of distributing more than 50 grams of "cocaine base, which carries a 10-year minimum sentence." Following this conviction, DePierre was sentenced to 10 years in a federal prison followed by 5 years of supervised release. Two years later, the US Court of Appeals upheld the sentencing,

== Question Before the Court ==
Does the term "cocaine base" cover a broad spectrum of cocaine defined chemically as a base, or is the term specifically limited to the use and distribution of "crack" cocaine?

== Decision of the Court ==
In a unanimous decision, Justice Sotomayor wrote the opinion of the Court defining cocaine base as not just crack cocaine, but any substance that contains "cocaine in its chemically basic form."

== Concurring Opinion ==
Justice Scalia wrote a brief, humorous concurring opinion arguing that the Court's look into legislative history is unneeded and potentially harmful.

== See also ==
- Cocaine in the United States
