= Janus Capital Group, Inc. v. First Derivative Traders =

- Supreme Court of the United States

Argued December 7, 2010 Decided June 13, 2011
- Full case name: Janus Capital Group, Inc., et al. v. First Derivative Traders
- Docket no.: 09-525
- Citations: 564 U.S. 135 (more) 131 S. Ct. 2296; 180 L. Ed. 2d 166
- Argument: Oral argument

Case history
- Prior: Dismissed sub nom. In re Mutual Funds Inv. Litigation, 487 F. Supp. 2d 618 (D. Md. 2007); reversed, 566 F.3d 111 (3d Cir. 2009); cert. granted, 561 U.S. 1024 (2010).

Holding
- A service provider cannot be held liable in a private action under SEC Rule 10b-5.

Court membership
- Chief Justice John Roberts Associate Justices Antonin Scalia · Anthony Kennedy; Clarence Thomas · Ruth Bader Ginsburg; Stephen Breyer · Samuel Alito; Sonia Sotomayor · Elena Kagan

Case opinions
- Majority: Thomas, joined by Roberts, Scalia, Kennedy, Alito
- Dissent: Breyer, joined by Ginsburg, Sotomayor, Kagan

Janus Capital Group, Inc. v. First Derivative Traders, 564 U.S. 135 (2011), was a case before the Supreme Court of the United States in which the Court held that a service provider cannot be held liable in a private action under SEC Rule 10b-5.
