= PLIVA, Inc. v. Mensing =

- Supreme Court of the United States

Decided June 23, 2011
- Full case name: PLIVA, Inc. v. Mensing
- Citations: 564 U.S. 604 (more)

Holding
- Federal regulations govern what gets put on drug labels for generic drugs, so generic drug manufacturers cannot be sued for damages under state laws that punish a failure to warn.

Court membership
- Chief Justice John Roberts Associate Justices Antonin Scalia · Anthony Kennedy; Clarence Thomas · Ruth Bader Ginsburg; Stephen Breyer · Samuel Alito; Sonia Sotomayor · Elena Kagan

Case opinions
- Majority: Thomas (except II-B-2), joined by Roberts, Scalia, Alito, Kennedy
- Plurality: Thomas (II-B-2), joined by Roberts, Scalia, Alito
- Dissent: Sotomayor, joined by Ginsburg, Breyer, Kagan

PLIVA, Inc. v. Mensing, 564 U.S. 604 (2011), was a United States Supreme Court case in which the court held that federal regulations govern what gets put on drug labels for generic drugs, so generic drug manufacturers cannot be sued for damages under state laws that punish a failure to warn.

== Background ==
Five years after the Food and Drug Administration (FDA) first approved metoclopramide, a drug commonly used to treat digestive-tract problems, under the brand name Reglan, generic manufacturers such as PLIVA also began producing the drug. Because of accumulating evidence that long-term metoclopramide use can cause tardive dyskinesia, a severe neurological disorder, warning labels for the drug were strengthened and clarified several times, including in 2009.

The plaintiffs in this case, including Gladys Mensing, were people prescribed Reglan in 2001 and 2002, but both received the generic drug from their pharmacists. After taking the drug as prescribed for several years, both developed tardive dyskinesia. In separate state-court tort actions, they sued the generic drug manufacturers, including PLIVA, that produced the metoclopramide they took (Manufacturers). Each plaintiff alleged, among other things, that long-term metoclopramide use caused their disorder and that the Manufacturers were liable under state tort law for failing to provide adequate warning labels. In both suits, the Manufacturers urged that federal statutes and FDA regulations pre-empted the state tort claims by requiring the same safety and efficacy labeling for generic metoclopramide as was mandated at the time for Reglan. The Fifth and Eighth Circuits rejected these arguments, holding that the plaintiffs' claims were not pre-empted.

== Oral argument ==
The three consolidated cases were argued on March 30, 2011. Jay P. Lefkowitz of Kirkland & Ellis argued the cause for the petitioners in all three cases; joining him on the briefs for the petitioners in No. 09–993 were Michael D. Shumsky, Philippa Scarlett, Joseph P. Thomas, Linda E. Maichl, Richard A. Oetheimer, Jonathan I. Price, and William F. Sheehan. Irene C. Keyse-Walker and Richard A. Dean appeared for petitioners Actavis Elizabeth LLC and Actavis, Inc., and Alexandra W. Miller and Jane M. Ricci also appeared for Actavis, Inc. Louis M. Bograd argued the cause for the respondents, joined on the brief by Lucia J. W. McLaren, Daniel J. McGlynn, Claire Prestel, Richard A. Tonry II, Brian L. Glorioso, and Kristine K. Sims. Deputy Solicitor General Edwin S. Kneedler argued for the United States as amicus curiae in support of the respondents.

== Opinion of the court ==
The Supreme Court issued an opinion on June 23, 2011.
