= Talk America, Inc. v. Michigan Bell Telephone Co. =

- Supreme Court of the United States

Argued March 30, 2011 Decided June 9, 2011
- Full case name: Talk America, Inc. v. Michigan Bell Telephone Co. DBA AT&T Michigan
- Docket nos.: 10-313; 10-329
- Citations: 564 U.S. 50 (more) 131 S. Ct. 2254; 180 L. Ed. 2d 96
- Argument: Oral argument
- Opinion announcement: Opinion announcement

Case history
- Prior: Michigan Public Service Commission decision reversed sub nom. Mich. Bell Tel. Co. v. Lark, 2007 WL 2868633 (E.D. Mich. 2007); affirmed sub nom. Michigan Bell Telephone Co. v. Covad Communications Co., 597 F.3d 370 (6th Cir. 2010); cert. granted, 562 U.S. 1104 (2010).

Holding
- The Federal Communications Commission had advanced a reasonable interpretation of its regulations in a dispute with AT&T.

Court membership
- Chief Justice John Roberts Associate Justices Antonin Scalia · Anthony Kennedy; Clarence Thomas · Ruth Bader Ginsburg; Stephen Breyer · Samuel Alito; Sonia Sotomayor · Elena Kagan

Case opinions
- Majority: Thomas, joined by unanimous
- Concurrence: Scalia
- Kagan took no part in the consideration or decision of the case.

Talk America, Inc. v. Michigan Bell Telephone Co., 564 U.S. 50 (2011), was a United States Supreme Court case in which the Court held that the Federal Communications Commission (FCC) had advanced a reasonable interpretation of its regulations in a dispute with AT&T. The case was consolidated with Isiogu v. Michigan Bell Telephone Co..
