= Fowler v. United States =

- Supreme Court of the United States

Decided May 26, 2011
- Full case name: Fowler v. United States
- Citations: 563 U.S. 668 (more)

Holding
- When someone is charged of a killing under the federal witness-tampering statute, the state must prove a violation by showing there was a reasonable likelihood that a relevant communication would have been made to a federal officer.

Court membership
- Chief Justice John Roberts Associate Justices Antonin Scalia · Anthony Kennedy; Clarence Thomas · Ruth Bader Ginsburg; Stephen Breyer · Samuel Alito; Sonia Sotomayor · Elena Kagan

Case opinions
- Majority: Breyer, joined by Roberts, Kennedy, Thomas, Sotomayor, Kagan
- Concurrence: Scalia (in judgment)
- Dissent: Alito, joined by Ginsburg

Fowler v. United States, 563 U.S. 668 (2011), was a United States Supreme Court case in which the court held that when someone is charged of a killing under the federal witness-tampering statute, the state must prove a violation by showing there was a reasonable likelihood that a relevant communication would have been made to a federal officer.

== Background ==
While preparing to rob a bank, Charles Andrew Fowler and others were discovered by a local police officer, whom Fowler killed. Fowler was convicted of violating the federal witness-tampering statute, which makes it a crime "to kill another person, with intent to... prevent the communication by any person to a [Federal] law enforcement officer" of "information relating to the... possible commission of a Federal offense." Rejecting Fowler's argument that the evidence was insufficient to show that he had killed the officer intending to prevent him from communicating with a federal officer, the Eleventh Circuit Court of Appeals held that a showing of a possible or potential communication to federal authorities was sufficient.

== Opinion of the court ==
The Supreme Court issued an opinion on May 26, 2011.
