= Nevada Commission on Ethics v. Carrigan =

- Supreme Court of the United States

Argued April 27, 2011 Decided June 13, 2011
- Full case name: Nevada Commission on Ethics, Petitioner v. Michael A. Carrigan
- Docket no.: 10-568
- Citations: 564 U.S. 117 (more) 131 S. Ct. 2343; 180 L. Ed. 2d 150
- Argument: Oral argument
- Opinion announcement: Opinion announcement

Holding
- The Nevada Ethics in Government Law is not unconstitutionally overbroad.

Court membership
- Chief Justice John Roberts Associate Justices Antonin Scalia · Anthony Kennedy; Clarence Thomas · Ruth Bader Ginsburg; Stephen Breyer · Samuel Alito; Sonia Sotomayor · Elena Kagan

Case opinions
- Majority: Scalia, joined by Roberts, Kennedy, Thomas, Ginsburg, Breyer, Sotomayor, Kagan
- Concurrence: Kennedy
- Concurrence: Alito (in part)

Laws applied
- U.S. Const. amend. I

Nevada Commission on Ethics v. Carrigan, 564 U.S. 117 (2011), was a Supreme Court of the United States decision in which the court held that the Nevada Ethics in Government Law, which required government officials recuse in cases involving a conflict of interest, is not unconstitutionally overbroad. Specifically, the law requires government officials to recuse themselves from advocating for and voting on the passage of legislation if private commitments to the interests of others materially affect the official's judgment. Under the terms of this law, the Nevada Commission on Ethics censured city councilman Michael Carrigan for voting on a land project for which his campaign manager was a paid consultant. Carrigan challenged his censure in court and the Nevada Supreme Court ruled in his favor, claiming that casting his vote was protected speech. The Supreme Court reversed, ruling that voting by a public official on a public matter is not First Amendment speech.

== Background ==
Sparks, Nevada, where Michael Carrigan was elected City Councilman

=== Nevada's Ethics in Government Law ===
Nevada's Ethics in Government law states that "a public officer shall not vote upon or advocate the passage or failure of, but may otherwise participate in the consideration of, a matter with respect to which the independence of judgment of a reasonable person in the public officer’s situation would be materially affected by... the public officer’s commitment in a private capacity to the interests of others." The law further defines commitment in a private capacity to the interests of others as "a commitment to a person who is a member of the public officer’s or employee’s household; is related to the public officer or employee by blood, adoption or marriage within the third degree of consanguinity or affinity; employs the public officer or employee or a member of the public officer’s or employee’s household; whom the public officer or employee has a substantial and continuing business relationship; or any other commitment or relationship that is substantially similar to a commitment or relationship described."

=== Investigation of Michael Carrigan ===
The Nevada Commission on Ethics, the body responsible for administering and enforcing the Ethics in Government law, opened an investigation into Michael Carrigan. In 2007, the commission found that Michael Carrigan, an elected member of the city council of Sparks, Nevada, had violated the law for not abstaining from voting on a hotel/casino project known as the Lazy 8 project. The commission held that Carrigan's relationship with Carlos Vasquez—Carrigan's friend, former political advisor, and a paid consultant on the Lazy 8 project—was significant enough to warrant recusal under the ethics law. However, the commission found that Carrigan's violation was not willful and that Carrigan did not use his position to secure or grant unwarranted privileges for Vasquez. Carrigan petitioned for judicial review of the decision, which was denied by a district court but granted by the Supreme Court of Nevada.

=== Nevada Supreme Court Ruling ===
In 2010, a majority of the Nevada Supreme Court held that voting by public officers on public issues is protected speech under the First Amendment and that the ethics law was unconstitutionally overbroad in violation of the First Amendment. The dissent argued that there was no previous decision that held that a public official voting was core political speech. The Supreme Court of the United States granted certiorari in January 2011.

== Opinion of the court ==
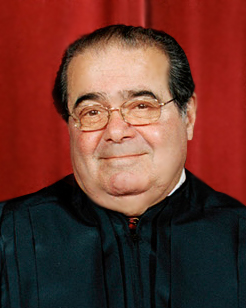
Justice Scalia delivered the opinion for the Court.

Justice Scalia wrote the opinion of the court, which reversed the Supreme Court of Nevada, holding that the Ethics Act did not violate the First Amendment. Scalia wrote, "a 'universal and long-established' tradition of prohibiting certain conduct creates a strong presumption that the prohibition is constitutional" (citing Republican Party of Minnesota v. White) and that "the Nevada Supreme Court and Carrigan have not cited a single decision invalidating a generally applicable conflict-of-interest recusal rule-- and such rules and have been commonplace for over 200 years". The court held that the Nevada Supreme Court's belief that recusal rules violate legislators' First Amendment rights is inconsistent with long-standing traditions of Congress, the judiciary, and the States.

Further, the court found that a legislator's vote is representative of the legislator's power, but rather belongs to the legislator's constituents. Therefore, restrictions on legislators' voting cannot infringe on the legislator's individual right to speech. The Court held that even if a vote could express personal views, the ethics law would still not be a violation of Carrigan's First Amendment rights because "this Court has rejected the notion that the First Amendment confers a right to use governmental mechanics to convey a message."

=== Kennedy's concurrence ===
In his concurrence, Justice Kennedy voiced concern that the ethics law had vague language and was an invitation for selective enforcement. Kennedy joined the Court's opinion because "the act of casting an official vote is not itself protected by the Speech Clause of the First Amendment", however he noted that "as the Court observes, however, the question whether Nevada’s recusal statute was applied in a manner that burdens the First Amendment freedoms discussed above is not presented in this case". The court did not consider the issue because such an argument was not raised in the Nevada Supreme Court case or Carrigan's brief in opposition to the writ of certiorari.

=== Alito's concurrence ===
Justice Alito concurred in part and concurred in judgment. Alito disagreed with the court in finding that restrictions upon legislators' voting are not restrictions upon legislators' speech. Alito argued that "the act of voting is not drained of its expressive content when the vote has a legal effect". Despite disagreement on whether legislators' voting constitutes speech, Alito concurred in judgement based on the court's arguments that legislative recusal laws have historically been long standing and not overturned.
