= Developmental Disabilities Assistance and Bill of Rights Act of 2000 =

US law

There are two pieces of legislature in the United States that have this name. One is H.R. 4920, which was passed by the House on July 26, 2000 but subsequently died in the Senate.

The other is S. 1809, which was signed by President Clinton on Oct 30, 2000. This act has become Public Law 106-402. This legislation is currently being executed and monitored by the Administration on Developmental Disabilities.

The full title of each of these bills: "To improve service systems for individuals with developmental disabilities, and for other purposes"

== See also ==
- Developmentally Disabled Assistance and Bill of Rights Act
