= United States v. Jicarilla Apache Nation =

- Supreme Court of the United States

Argued April 20, 2011 Decided June 13, 2011
- Full case name: United States v. Jicarilla Apache Nation
- Docket no.: 10-382
- Citations: 564 U.S. 162 (more) 131 S. Ct. 2313; 180 L. Ed. 2d 187
- Argument: Oral argument

Case history
- Prior: Defendant ordered to produce documents sub nom. Jicarilla Apache Nation v. United States, 88 Fed.Cl. 1 (2009); petitions for a writ of mandamus denied sub nom. In re United States, 590 F.3d 1305 (Fed. Cir. 2009); cert. granted, 562 U.S. 1128 (2011).

Holding
- The fiduciary exception to attorney–client privilege does not apply to the general trust relationship between the United States and Indian tribes.

Court membership
- Chief Justice John Roberts Associate Justices Antonin Scalia · Anthony Kennedy; Clarence Thomas · Ruth Bader Ginsburg; Stephen Breyer · Samuel Alito; Sonia Sotomayor · Elena Kagan

Case opinions
- Majority: Alito, joined by Roberts, Scalia, Kennedy, Thomas
- Concurrence: Ginsburg (in judgment), joined by Breyer
- Dissent: Sotomayor
- Kagan took no part in the consideration or decision of the case.

United States v. Jicarilla Apache Nation, 564 U.S. 162 (2011), is a United States Supreme Court case in which the Court held that the fiduciary exception to attorney–client privilege does not apply to the general trust relationship between the United States and Indian tribes.

== Background ==
In 2001, the Jicarilla Apache Nation sued the federal government for breach of trust, claiming that the United States government had mismanaged the financial interests and funds held in trust for the tribe. The tribe sought access to attorney-client communications about the trust operation. The Court of Federal Claims (CFC) granted this motion in part, holding that the documents fell within the fiduciary exception to attorney-client privilege.

The Federal Circuit Court of Appeals agreed with the CFC, claiming that the trust relationship between the Jicarilla Apache Nation and the United States government was sufficiently similar to a private trust. As such, they argued, the federal government's fiduciary obligation was greater than the attorney-client privilege.

== Opinion of the Court ==
The Court, in an opinion penned by Justice Alito, overturned the lower courts' rulings, and held that the fiduciary exception to attorney-client privilege does not apply to the trust relationship between the United States and Indian tribes. The government's trust obligations to the tribe are primarily established through statute, not federal law. Additionally, the Court argued, the United States acts not as a traditional trustee would act — obligated to the interests of its beneficiary — but instead as a sovereign within its rights to execute federal law towards its own interests.
