= Chamber of Commerce v. Whiting =

- Supreme Court of the United States

Argued December 8, 2010 Decided May 26, 2011
- Full case name: Chamber of Commerce of the United States of America, et al., Petitioners v. Michael B. Whiting, et al.
- Docket no.: 09–115
- Citations: 563 U.S. 582 (more) 131 S. Ct. 1968; 179 L. Ed. 2d 1031

Case history
- Prior: Dismissed for lack of jurisdiction sub. nom.Arizona Contractors Ass'n, Inc. v. Napolitano (Arizona Contractors I), 526 F. Supp. 2d 968 (D. Ariz. 2007); refiled, judgement for defendants sub nom. Arizona Contractors Ass'n, Inc. v. Candelaria (Arizona Contractors II), 534 F. Supp. 2d 1036 (D. Ariz. 2008); affirmed sub. nom. Chicanos Por La Causa, Inc. v. Napolitano, 558 F.3d 856 (9th. Cir. 2009); cert. granted, 561 U.S. 1024 (2010)

Holding
- Arizona law instructing courts to suspend or revoke the business licenses of in-state employers that employ unauthorized aliens does not violate the Immigration Reform and Control Act of 1986.

Court membership
- Chief Justice John Roberts Associate Justices Antonin Scalia · Anthony Kennedy; Clarence Thomas · Ruth Bader Ginsburg; Stephen Breyer · Samuel Alito; Sonia Sotomayor · Elena Kagan

Case opinions
- Majority: Roberts, joined by Scalia, Kennedy, Alito; Thomas (Parts I, II–A, and III–A; concurred in judgment)
- Dissent: Breyer, joined by Ginsburg
- Dissent: Sotomayor
- Kagan took no part in the consideration or decision of the case.

Chamber of Commerce v. Whiting, 563 U.S. 582 (2011), is a decision by the Supreme Court of the United States that upheld an Arizona state law suspending or revoking business licenses of businesses that hire illegal aliens.

The case dealt with the question of whether the Legal Arizona Workers Act was invalid under federal statutes, in particular the Immigration Reform and Control Act. On May 26, 2011, the Supreme Court ruled, in a 5-3 decision, that the Legal Arizona Workers Act was not preempted by federal legislation. Justices Roberts, Scalia, Kennedy, Alito and Thomas formed the majority opinion, and Justices Breyer, Ginsburg and Sotomayor formed the minority opinion, with Sotomayor filling her own dissenting opinion. Justice Kagan was recused in the case because she had a prior role in the case from her former role as Solicitor General of the United States.

== Background ==
"The Legal Arizona Workers Act allows superior courts in Arizona to suspend or revoke business licenses of employers who knowingly or intentionally hire unauthorized aliens" and also "makes participation in E-Verify (a system that determines eligibility for employment based on information from I-9 forms and U.S. Department of Homeland Security and Social Security Administration records) mandatory for all employers." The main questions presented in this case were the following:

- Does the Arizona law, which "imposes sanctions on employers who hire unauthorized aliens is invalid under a federal statute", the Immigration Reform and Control Act, which has a provision to "preempt any State or local law imposing civil or criminal sanctions... upon those who employ, or recruit or refer for a fee for employment, unauthorized alien?"
- Is the Arizona statute requiring the use of the federal electronic employment verification system by all employers preempted by the federal law?
- Is the Arizona statute implicitly preempted because it undermines the federal "comprehensive scheme" to regulate the employment of aliens?

The Supreme Court had to determine whether the federal law that states companies cannot be punished for hiring undocumented workers unknowingly, except in cases of licensing, would prevent a state, such as Arizona, from having a law imposing sanctions on employers that hired undocumented workers.

== Majority opinion ==
The majority ruled that federal law "does not prevent Arizona from revoking the business licenses of state companies that knowingly hire undocumented workers, or from requiring employers in the state to use a federal electronic system to check that their workers are authorized to work in the United States." During the oral arguments, Justice Scalia, in particular, defended the states' authority in questions of enforcement of immigration laws, given what "he perceived as a failure of the federal government" to enforce laws to keep undocumented workers out of the country. In addition, since the federal statute indicated that the state government were allowed to take action "through licensing and similar laws," Chief Justice Roberts and Justices Alito indicated that Arizona's law was valid under the federal law because that part of the federal statute was very broad.

In the majority opinion, Chief Justice Roberts accepted the arguments that the state of Arizona had made about how the initiative was narrow and closely tracked and was modeled after the objectives of the 1986 federal law. He also indicated that the Arizona law was the "route least likely to cause tension with federal law" and that the saving clause provided "a licensing exemption to general preemption of state worker laws."

Even though Justice Kennedy joined the majority opinion, during the oral arguments he appeared to agree with some of the arguments that were made in the dissenting opinion. On an argument Justice Ginsburg made about "an anomaly" that Arizona is forbidden by federal law to impose a fine for hiring an undocumented worker, but Arizona has the ability to revoke a license to do business, as well as on the question of the Arizona E-Verify provisions, Justice Kennedy indicated that the E-Verify provisions "is almost a classic example of doing something inconsistent with the federal requirement," given that the federal law indicates that the federal E-Verify is a voluntary system, but the Arizona E-Verify provisions make the program mandatory to a greater extent.

== Dissenting opinions ==
Justice Breyer, dissenting, had indicated during oral arguments that he believed that "Congress… had taken 'an absolutely balanced' approach" in an attempt to ensure undocumented workers were not able to get jobs but make sure as well that businesses did not discriminate in hiring to avoid the risk of losing its license.

Also dissenting, Justice Sotomayor indicated that the majority's reading of the exception "cannot be reconciled" with the rest of what Congress enacted in 1986: "Congress could not plausibly have intended… for the saving clause to operate in the way the majority reads it to do."

Along that line, Justices Sotomayor and Breyer argued that the Arizona law went far beyond the "scope of federal control" and that it would "actively frustrate federal efforts and compromise the need for uniformity in dealing with unlawful aliens." Given the Arizona law created new enforcement mechanisms in handling of undocumented workers, it prevented uniform policies, which went against the spirit of the federal law: to have uniform legislation.

== Reactions ==
Some argue that Supreme Court sent a "strong signal" that the states will be afforded the ability to control and experiment with laws involving undocumented workers who live and work with each given state, given the Court's majority indicated that the licensing exception to the federal law was a very broad exception. In her dissent, Justice Sotomayor indicated that the majority had "turned states loose to determine for themselves whether someone has employed an unauthorized alien so long as they do so in conjunction with licensing sanctions."
