= Davis v. United States (2011) =

- Supreme Court of the United States

Argued March 21, 2011 Decided June 16, 2011
- Full case name: Willie Gene Davis v. United States
- Docket no.: 09-11328
- Citations: 564 U.S. 229 (more) 131 S. Ct. 2419; 180 L. Ed. 2d 285
- Argument: Oral argument

Case history
- Prior: United States v. Davis, No. 2:07-cr-0248-WKW, 2008 WL 1927377 (M.D. Ala. 2008) (denying motion to suppress), aff'd, 598 F.3d 1259 (11th Cir. 2010), cert. granted, 131 S. Ct. 502 (2010).

Holding
- Searches conducted in objectively reasonable reliance on binding appellate precedent are not subject to the exclusionary rule.

Court membership
- Chief Justice John Roberts Associate Justices Antonin Scalia · Anthony Kennedy; Clarence Thomas · Ruth Bader Ginsburg; Stephen Breyer · Samuel Alito; Sonia Sotomayor · Elena Kagan

Case opinions
- Majority: Alito, joined by Roberts, Scalia, Kennedy, Thomas, and Kagan
- Concurrence: Sotomayor
- Dissent: Breyer, joined by Ginsburg

Laws applied
- U.S. Const. amend. IV

Davis v. United States, 564 U.S. 229 (2011), was a case in which the Supreme Court of the United States "[held] that searches conducted in objectively reasonable reliance on binding appellate precedent are not subject to the exclusionary rule". This simply means that if law enforcement officers conduct a search in a reasonable manner with respect to established legal precedent any evidence found may not be excluded from trial based on the exclusionary rule.

== See also ==
- Appellate Court
- Precedent
