= Arizona Christian School Tuition Organization v. Winn =

- Supreme Court of the United States

Argued November 3, 2010 Decided April 4, 2011
- Full case name: Arizona Christian School Tuition Organization, Petitioner v. Kathleen M. Winn, et al.
- Docket nos.: 09-987; 09-991
- Citations: 563 U.S. 125 (more) 131 S. Ct. 1436; 179 L. Ed. 2d 523; 2011 U.S. LEXIS 2612
- Argument: Oral argument

Case history
- Prior: Motion to dismiss granted, Winn v. Killian, No. 00-cv-287, 2001 WL 37120490 (D. Ariz. Feb. 27, 2001); reversed, 307 F.3d 1011 (9th Cir. 2002); rehearing denied sub nom., Hibbs v. Winn, 321 F.3d 911 (9th Cir. 2003); affirmed and remanded, 542 U.S. 88 (2004); dismissed on different ground, 361 F. Supp. 2d 1117 (D. Ariz. 2005); reversed sub nom., Winn v. Arizona Christian School Tuition Organization, 562 F.3d 1002 (9th Cir 2009); affirmed en banc, 586 F.3d 649 (9th Cir 2009); cert. granted, 560 U.S. 924 (2010).

Holding
- Taxpayers lack standing under Article III to challenge tax credits because credits are not government spending.

Court membership
- Chief Justice John Roberts Associate Justices Antonin Scalia · Anthony Kennedy; Clarence Thomas · Ruth Bader Ginsburg; Stephen Breyer · Samuel Alito; Sonia Sotomayor · Elena Kagan

Case opinions
- Majority: Kennedy, joined by Roberts, Scalia, Thomas, Alito
- Concurrence: Scalia, joined by Thomas
- Dissent: Kagan, joined by Ginsburg, Breyer, Sotomayor

Laws applied
- U.S. Const. art. III

Arizona Christian School Tuition Organization v. Winn, 563 U.S. 125 (2011), is a decision by the Supreme Court of the United States involving taxpayer standing under Article Three of the United States Constitution.

A group of Arizona taxpayers challenged a state law providing tax credits to people who donate to school tuition organizations providing scholarships to students attending private or religious schools. The taxpayers claimed a violation of the Establishment Clause. The District Court dismissed the case, holding that the taxpayers did not state a valid claim. The decision was reversed by the Ninth Circuit Court of Appeals, which ruled that the respondents had standing to sue, citing Flast v. Cohen.

The Supreme Court ruled 5–4, in an opinion delivered by Justice Anthony Kennedy, that the plaintiffs did not have standing to sue. The Court stated that it had "rejected the general proposition that an individual who has paid taxes has a 'continuing, legally cognizable interest in ensuring that those funds are not used by the Government in a way that violates the Constitution.'" Ultimately, the Supreme Court found that any damages or harm claimed by the taxpayers by virtue of simply being a taxpayer would be pure speculation because the issue at hand was a tax credit and not a government expenditure. Justice Scalia filed a concurring opinion, joined by Justice Thomas.

In her dissent, Justice Kagan said "cash grants and targeted tax breaks are means of accomplishing the same government objective—to provide financial support to select individuals or organizations." She further argued: "taxpayers should be able to challenge the subsidy." The dissent was joined by Justices Ginsburg, Breyer, and Sotomayor. Bruce Peabody, a political science professor at Fairleigh Dickinson University, remarked "the case brought out four dissents, a signal that those justices were prepared to decide the substantive issue." Equally, Peter Woolley, professor of political science and director of the PublicMind Poll, posited "in making this ruling on such narrow grounds, the court virtually guarantees that plaintiff in one guise or another will be back another day."
