= Microsoft Corp. v. i4i Ltd. Partnership =

- Supreme Court of the United States

Argued April 18, 2011 Decided June 9, 2011
- Full case name: Microsoft Corp. v. i4i Ltd. Partnership
- Docket no.: 10-290
- Citations: 564 U.S. 91 (more) 131 S. Ct. 2238; 180 L. Ed. 2d 131; 2011 U.S. LEXIS 4376; 79 U.S.L.W. 4454; 98 U.S.P.Q.2d 1857

Holding
- 35 U.S.C. § 282 requires a patent-invalidity defense to be proved by clear and convincing evidence.

Court membership
- Chief Justice John Roberts Associate Justices Antonin Scalia · Anthony Kennedy; Clarence Thomas · Ruth Bader Ginsburg; Stephen Breyer · Samuel Alito; Sonia Sotomayor · Elena Kagan

Case opinions
- Majority: Sotomayor, joined by Scalia, Kennedy, Ginsburg, Breyer, Alito, Kagan
- Concurrence: Breyer, joined by Scalia, Alito
- Concurrence: Thomas (in judgment)
- Roberts took no part in the consideration or decision of the case.

Microsoft Corp. v. i4i Ltd. Partnership, 564 U.S. 91 (2011), was a case decided by the Supreme Court of the United States. It deals with the presumption of validity and the standard of evidence in patent lawsuits. This case is widely considered as a prime example of a frivolous lawsuit by a patent troll, underscoring the need for a reform of the US patent law.

The case was a patent dispute between small Toronto-based company i4i Ltd. Partnership and Microsoft for infringement of a patent regarding custom XML encoding in Microsoft Word, a feature used by a "small fraction of Microsoft Word users". The original lawsuit was filed in the Federal Court for the Eastern District of Texas, known for its decisions favoring patent trolls. i4i prevailed both in the district court and on appeal to the CAFC. The latter awarded i4i $200 million against Microsoft as a reasonable royalty.

Under 35 U.S.C. § 282, a patent, which has been examined and issued by the USPTO is entitled to a presumption of validity in courts, and this presumption can be overcome based on clear and convincing evidence.

On appeal to the SCOTUS Microsoft argued that the clear and convincing evidence standard applied by the Federal Circuit was inappropriate, and that because of the backlog of unexamined patent applications at the USPTO, patent examiners do not have adequate amount of time to examine patent applications, and therefore a preponderance of the evidence standard should be applied by courts, when patent validity is challenged.

The US Supreme Court rejected Microsoft's position. Judge Sotomayor wrote: "Congress has amended the patent laws to account for concerns about 'bad' patents, including by expanding the reexamination process to provide for inter partes proceedings. Through it all the evidentiary standard adopted in §282 has gone untouched."

The courts also issued and confirmed a permanent injunction against Microsoft. The disputed feature has been removed from Word since.
