= J. McIntyre Machinery, Ltd. v. Nicastro =

J. McIntyre Machinery v. Nicastro
- Supreme Court of the United States

Argued January 11, 2011 Decided June 27, 2011
- Full case name: J. McIntyre Machinery, Ltd. v. Robert Nicastro
- Docket no.: 09-1343
- Citations: 564 U.S. 873 (more) 131 S. Ct. 2780; 180 L. Ed. 2d 765

Holding
- A court may not exercise jurisdiction over a defendant that has not purposefully availed itself of doing business in the jurisdiction or placed goods in the stream of commerce in the expectation they would be purchased in the jurisdiction.

Court membership
- Chief Justice John Roberts Associate Justices Antonin Scalia · Anthony Kennedy; Clarence Thomas · Ruth Bader Ginsburg; Stephen Breyer · Samuel Alito; Sonia Sotomayor · Elena Kagan

Case opinions
- Plurality: Kennedy, joined by Roberts, Scalia, Thomas
- Concurrence: Breyer (in judgment), joined by Alito
- Dissent: Ginsburg, joined by Sotomayor, Kagan

Laws applied
- U.S. Const. amend. XIV

J. McIntyre Machinery, Ltd. v. Nicastro, 564 U.S. 873 (2011), is a decision by the United States Supreme Court holding that a court may not exercise jurisdiction over a defendant that has not purposefully availed itself of doing business in the jurisdiction or placed goods in the stream of commerce in the expectation they would be purchased in the jurisdiction.

== Background ==
An accident severed four fingers off the right hand of Robert Nicastro, who was operating a recycling machine used to cut scrap metal. A British company manufactured the machine and sold it through its exclusive U.S. distributor. Nicastro sued J. McIntyre Machinery, Ltd., the British company, and its U.S. distributor, McIntyre Machinery America, Ltd., in the Bergen County vicinage of the Law Division of the Superior Court of New Jersey, under a strict product liability theory. The British parent company moved to dismiss the suit against it for lack of personal jurisdiction; the Law Division granted the motion. The Appellate Division of the Superior Court reversed the dismissal; the Supreme Court of New Jersey affirmed the Appellate Division's reversal of the Law Division's dismissal, holding that the foreign company had sufficient contacts with the state.

== Decision ==
In a 6–3 decision, the Supreme Court reversed the New Jersey Court, holding that the state court did not have jurisdiction. Three opinions were delivered, none with a majority of the Justices in support.

According to Justice Kennedy's plurality opinion, there were insufficient facts to show that J. McIntyre Machinery, the British company, targeted New Jersey specifically. Although the company targeted the United States as a whole, only its distributor targeted the specific states. The stream of commerce theory is insufficient to give rise to jurisdiction without specific targeting of a specific state.

Justice Breyer, joined by Justice Alito, concurred in the judgment on narrower grounds. Rather than announce a broad rule, Breyer determined that based on the facts of this specific case New Jersey did not have jurisdiction because so few machines wound up in the state. However, Breyer was open to the possibility that if many machines were flowing into the state, the state might have jurisdiction even absent specific targeting.

Dissenting, Justice Ginsburg, joined by Justice Sotomayor and Justice Kagan, argued that by targeting the United States as a whole, the petitioner had targeted every state sufficiently to subject itself to New Jersey's jurisdiction.
