= On-sale bar =

In United States patent law, the on-sale bar is a limitation on patentability codified at 35 U.S.C. § 102. It provides that an invention cannot be patented if it has been for sale for over one year prior to the patent filing.

== 35 U.S.C. 102(a)(1) ==
(a) Novelty; Prior Art.— A person shall be entitled to a patent unless— (1) the claimed invention was patented, described in a printed publication, or in public use, on sale, or otherwise available to the public before the effective filing date of the claimed invention...

== MPEP 2133.03(b) "On Sale" [R-2] - 2100 Patentability ==
An impermissible sale has occurred if there was a definite sale, or offer to sell, more than 1 year before the effective filing date of the U.S. application and the subject matter of the sale, or offer to sell, fully anticipated the claimed invention or would have rendered the claimed invention obvious by its addition to the prior art. Ferag AG v. Quipp, Inc., 45 F.3d 1562, 1565, 33 USPQ2d 1512, 1514 (Fed. Cir. 1995).

The on-sale bar of 35 U.S.C. 102(b) is triggered if the invention is both

1. the subject of a commercial offer for sale not primarily for experimental purposes and
2. ready for patenting. Pfaff v. Wells Elecs., Inc., 525 U.S. 55, 67, 48 USPQ2d 1641, 1646-47 (1998). Ready for patenting means either that the invention was reduced to practice or that enabling disclosures existed.

Traditional contract law principles are applied when determining whether a commercial offer for sale has occurred. See Linear Tech. Corp. v. Micrel, Inc., 275 F.3d 1040, 1048, 61 USPQ2d 1225, 1229 (Fed. Cir. 2001), petition for cert. filed, 71 USLW 3093 (Jul. 03, 2002) (No. 02-39); Group One, Ltd. v. Hallmark Cards, Inc., 254 F.3d 1041,1047, 59 USPQ2d 1121, 1126 (Fed. Cir. 2001) ("As a general proposition, we will look to the Uniform Commercial Code ('UCC') to define whether a communication or series of communications rises to the level of a commercial offer for sale.").

The on-sale bar is an extraordinarily (some would argue needlessly) complex body of patent law in all but the simplest cases. For instance, licenses are normally not considered a sale, even when a sample product is transferred as part of the license, but a computer software license is considered a barring sale even if the patent claims are method claims. The normal standard of reduction to practice (which requires recognizing the invention) has been ignored in several cases, for example an offer for sale of a waste disposal machine which, if accepted would have practiced a later invention due to the special nature of the waste, was considered a barring sale even though the invention had not even been conceived yet and the sale did not take place.

There is no joint-development exception to the on-sale bar, meaning that the on-sale bar in many cases is triggered when the invention is "ready for patenting," which can occur when an inventor is working alone at a drafting table. The ready-for-patenting standard is judged retrospectively in an adversarial setting, so even if an invention was far too premature to have been put into a patent application, with details missing, it may still be deemed to have been "ready for patenting." Moreover, an inadequate disclosure cannot provide priority for a continuation-in-part application, so an inventor who fears the on-sale bar and files a premature patent application may not be able to rescue it later.

== See also ==
- Novelty (patent)
- Post-sale restraint
