= United States v. Tohono Oʼodham Nation =

- Supreme Court of the United States

Decided April 26, 2011
- Full case name: United States v. Tohono Oʼodham Nation
- Citations: 563 U.S. 307 (more)

Holding
- A plaintiff cannot bring a suit in the Court of Federal Claims when they have another active suit based on substantially the same operative facts, regardless of any difference in the requested relief.

Court membership
- Chief Justice John Roberts Associate Justices Antonin Scalia · Anthony Kennedy; Clarence Thomas · Ruth Bader Ginsburg; Stephen Breyer · Samuel Alito; Sonia Sotomayor · Elena Kagan

Case opinions
- Majority: Kennedy
- Concurrence: Sotomayor (in judgment)
- Dissent: Ginsburg
- Kagan took no part in the consideration or decision of the case.

United States v. Tohono Oʼodham Nation, 563 U.S. 307 (2011), was a United States Supreme Court case in which the court held that a plaintiff cannot bring a suit in the Court of Federal Claims when they have another active suit based on substantially the same operative facts, regardless of any difference in the requested relief.

== Background ==
The Tohono Oʼodham Nation (Nation) filed suit in federal district court against federal officials who managed tribal assets held in trust by the United States Federal Government, alleging violations of fiduciary duty and requesting equitable relief. The next day, the Nation filed a lawsuit against the United States in the Court of Federal Claims (CFC), alleging almost identical violations and requesting money damages. The CFC case was dismissed under 28 U. S. C. §1500, which bars CFC jurisdiction over a claim if the plaintiff has another suit "for or in respect to" that claim pending against the United States or its agents in another court. The Federal Circuit reversed, finding that the two suits were not for or in respect to the same claim because, although they shared operative facts, they did not seek overlapping relief.

== Opinion of the court ==
The Supreme Court issued an opinion on April 26, 2011.
