= Bruesewitz v. Wyeth =

Bruesewitz v. Wyeth LLC
- Supreme Court of the United States

Argued October 12, 2010 Decided February 22, 2011
- Full case name: Russell Bruesewitz and Robalee Bruesewitz, Parents and Natural Guardians of Hannah Bruesewitz, A Minor Child, And In Their Own Right v. Wyeth LLC F/K/A Wyeth Laboratories, Wyeth-Ayerst Laboratories, Wyeth Lederle, Wyeth Lederle Vaccines, and Lederle Laboratories
- Docket no.: 09-152
- Citations: 562 U.S. 223 (more) 131 S. Ct. 1068; 179 L. Ed. 2d 1
- Argument: Oral argument

Case history
- Prior: Summary judgment granted to defendants, E.D. Pa.; affirmed, 561 F.3d 233 (3rd Cir. 2009); cert. granted, 559 U.S. 991 (2010).

Holding
- The 1986 Vaccine Act preempts all vaccine design defect claims against vaccine manufacturers.

Court membership
- Chief Justice John Roberts Associate Justices Antonin Scalia · Anthony Kennedy; Clarence Thomas · Ruth Bader Ginsburg; Stephen Breyer · Samuel Alito; Sonia Sotomayor · Elena Kagan

Case opinions
- Majority: Scalia, joined by Roberts, Kennedy, Thomas, Breyer, Alito
- Concurrence: Breyer
- Dissent: Sotomayor, joined by Ginsburg
- Kagan took no part in the consideration or decision of the case.

Laws applied
- National Childhood Vaccine Injury Act

Bruesewitz v. Wyeth LLC, 562 U.S. 223 (2011), is a United States Supreme Court case that decided whether a section of the Vaccine Act of 1986 preempts all vaccine design defect claims against vaccine manufacturers.

== Background ==
Hannah Bruesewitz, the daughter of the main petitioners in the case, received Wyeth's Tri-Immunol DTP vaccine as part of childhood immunizations. The Bruesewitzes claimed that Hannah's seizures and later developmental problems came from the vaccine. They filed suit in the "Vaccine Court", a special court within the United States Court of Federal Claims. Their petition was dismissed for failure to prove a link between the vaccine and Hannah's health problems.

They proceeded to sue in Pennsylvania state court. The case was removed to the local federal court, which held that the claim was preempted by a section of the National Childhood Vaccine Injury Act of 1986. The Third Circuit Court of Appeals affirmed. A petition for a writ of certiorari was granted on March 8, 2010, bringing the case to the Supreme Court.

In briefings before the Court, both sides argued over the specific language of the statutory provision.

== Decision ==
The case was decided on February 22, 2011. The Court, in a 6-2 opinion by Justice Antonin Scalia, held that the "plaintiffs design defect claims [were] expressly preempted by the Vaccine Act." Thus, the court affirmed laws that vaccine manufacturers are not liable for vaccine-induced injury or death if they are "accompanied by proper directions and warnings."

Justices Sonia Sotomayor and Ruth Bader Ginsburg dissented.
