= NASA v. Nelson =

- Supreme Court of the United States

Argued October 5, 2010 Decided January 19, 2011
- Full case name: National Aeronautics and Space Administration, et al. v. Nelson, et al.
- Docket no.: 09-530
- Citations: 562 U.S. 134 (more) 131 S. Ct. 746; 178 L. Ed. 2d 667

Case history
- Prior: Temporary injunction granted, 506 F.3d 713 (9th Cir. 2007); District court denial reversed, 512 F.3d 1134 (9th Cir. 2008); vacated and superseded, 530 F.3d 865 (9th Cir., 2008); rehearing en banc denied, 568 F.3d 1028 (9th Cir. 2009); cert. granted, 559 U.S. 990 (2010).

Holding
- NASA's background checks of contract employees do not violate any constitutional privacy right.

Court membership
- Chief Justice John Roberts Associate Justices Antonin Scalia · Anthony Kennedy; Clarence Thomas · Ruth Bader Ginsburg; Stephen Breyer · Samuel Alito; Sonia Sotomayor · Elena Kagan

Case opinions
- Majority: Alito, joined by Roberts, Kennedy, Ginsburg, Breyer, Sotomayor
- Concurrence: Scalia (in judgment), joined by Thomas
- Concurrence: Thomas (in judgment)
- Kagan took no part in the consideration or decision of the case.

Laws applied
- 5 U.S.C. § 552a

NASA v. Nelson, 562 U.S. 134 (2011), is a decision by the Supreme Court of the United States holding that NASA's background checks of contract employees did not violate any constitutional privacy right.

== Background ==
In 2004, President George W. Bush, on the recommendation of the 9/11 Commission, issued a directive ordering new, uniform identification standards for federal employees, including contract employees. Previously, federal contract employees were not generally required to undergo background investigation, except as required by specific contracts. Pursuant to this directive, the Department of Commerce mandated that contract employees with long-term access to federal facilities must complete a background check and set an October 2007 deadline for completion of this effort. The Jet Propulsion Laboratory (JPL), a NASA facility that is operated by the California Institute of Technology (Caltech) under government contract and hence is staffed entirely by contract employees, was subject to this requirement. In January 2007, NASA modified its contract with Caltech to include a new background-check requirement. All employees of JPL, including those deemed in low-risk positions, were informed that they must complete OPM form SF-85, which included an open-ended authorization to release effectively all personal information, or else they would be voluntarily terminated.

In August 2007, 28 JPL scientists and engineers including lead plaintiff Robert "Half" Nelson, a senior research scientist at JPL, sued NASA, Caltech, and the Department of Commerce in the District Court for the Central District of California, alleging that the background-check requirement violated a constitutional right to informational privacy. The district court denied a motion for a preliminary injunction, but the Ninth Circuit reversed the district court's order. The circuit court held that portions of the background-check forms were likely unconstitutional, particularly portions requiring disclosure of drug treatment or counseling (which the court questioned whether the government had a legitimate interest in requiring), as well as open-ended questions soliciting "any adverse information" concerning financial integrity, mental stability, and "other matters" (which the court doubted were narrowly tailored to meet legitimate interests). The Ninth Circuit later denied rehearing en banc. The government appealed, and the Supreme Court granted certiorari.

== Opinion of the Court ==
The issue before the Supreme Court was whether the background checks required of the JPL employees violated a right to informational privacy. In two previous cases, Whalen v. Roe and Nixon v. General Services Administration, the Supreme Court hinted that such a right might exist, but it had never settled the issue definitively. In an 8–0 decision, the Supreme Court ruled that the NASA background checks did not violate any such constitutional privacy right that might exist. The majority of the Supreme Court decided to leave open the question of whether any such constitutional right exists. Taking an approach similar to the Court in Whalen, they assumed, without deciding, that such a right does exist, and then ruled that the background checks do not violate such a right. In particular, they found that the government has a legitimate and long-standing interest in conducting reasonable employment background checks and said that courts should "keep those interests in mind when asked to go line-by-line through the Government’s employment forms and to scrutinize the choice and wording of the questions they contain". In addition, the Court found that the government's interests do not hinge on the distinction between federal civil-service employees and federal contract employees; the contract employees at JPL perform critical work, and the government has a strong interest in carrying out background checks on them.

Justice Scalia, in a concurring opinion joined by Justice Thomas, agreed that the background checks did not violate any constitutional rights, but argued that the Court should have settled the constitutional privacy question—in the negative. Scalia accused the respondents of asking the Court "to invent a constitutional right out of whole cloth" and dismissed their position as "farcical". Scalia criticized the Court's decision to evade the constitutional question, writing: "Thirty-three years have passed since the Court first suggested that the right may, or may not, exist. It is past time for the Court to abandon this Alfred Hitchcock line of our jurisprudence."

In addition to joining Scalia, Thomas also filed his own, very short (single-paragraph) concurrence, objecting to the idea of a constitutional right to informational privacy.

It was later revealed that Alito, who wrote the opinion of the Court, had cited a false statistic to justify the background checks. Alito cited a statistics by the National Association of Professional Background Screeners saying 88 percent of private companies conduct background checks. An investigation by ProPublica found that this statistic was made up.

== See also ==
- Josette Bellan, a plaintiff on the case
- FIPS 201
- Privacy laws of the United States
- List of United States Supreme Court cases, volume 562
