= Camreta v. Greene =

- Supreme Court of the United States

Argued March 1, 2011 Decided May 26, 2011
- Full case name: Bob Camreta v. Sarah Greene, personally and as next friend of S.G., a minor, and K.G., a minor; James Alford, Deputy Sheriff, Deschutes County, Oregon v. Sarah Greene, personally and as next friend of S.G., a minor
- Docket no.: 09-1454
- Citations: 563 U.S. 692 (more) 131 S. Ct. 2020; 179 L. Ed. 2d 1118; 2011 U.S. LEXIS 4016
- Argument: Oral argument
- Opinion announcement: Opinion announcement

Case history
- Prior: Greene v. Camreta, No. 6:05-cv-06047 (D. Or. Mar. 23, 2006), affirmed in part, reversed in part, 588 F.3d 1011 (9th Cir. 2009); cert. granted, 562 U.S. 960 (2010).
- Subsequent: On remand, 661 F.3d 1201 (9th Cir. 2011).

Holding
- In the general case the Court may review a lower court's constitutional ruling at the behest of government officials who have won final judgment on qualified immunity grounds but could not for this case due to details specific to it.

Court membership
- Chief Justice John Roberts Associate Justices Antonin Scalia · Anthony Kennedy; Clarence Thomas · Ruth Bader Ginsburg; Stephen Breyer · Samuel Alito; Sonia Sotomayor · Elena Kagan

Case opinions
- Majority: Kagan, joined by Roberts, Scalia, Ginsburg, Alito
- Concurrence: Scalia
- Concurrence: Sotomayor, joined by Breyer
- Dissent: Kennedy, joined by Thomas

Camreta v. Greene, 563 U.S. 692 (2011), was a case of the Supreme Court of the United States regarding the appealability cases resolved on immunity grounds.

In the underlying action, the Ninth Circuit had ruled that government officials had performed an unconstitutional seizure on a schoolchild, but the doctrine of qualified immunity protected the officials from a civil suit over the conduct. Consequently, the officials had formally won their suit. Although statute authorized the Supreme Court to accept appeals from any party, the Court had long eschewed appeals from prevailing parties, in part because such appeals typically regarded dicta. It was thus unclear whether the government officials could appeal and challenge the Ninth Circuit's ruling that the underlying seizure was unconstitutional.

In Camreta v. Greene, the Supreme Court held that government officials could appeal the underlying constitutional ruling in a case decided on qualified immunity grounds. Per the opinion of the court, the underlying constitutional rulings had substantial prospective effect, determining whether the challenged conduct might recur. Thus they were not dicta.

However, the Court also found that government officials could not appeal this particular case. The child's guardian no longer had any incentive to defend their side of the judgement. Although the officials might perform similar conduct in the future, the schoolchild was now of approximately graduating age, and thus unlikely to be the subject of any future seizure. As the underlying dispute had become moot, the Ninth Circuit's opinion was vacated per Munsingwear.

The case also had two concurring opinions and one dissenting opinion. Justice Sotomayor's concurring opinion argued that, as mootness was sufficient to decide the case, the court should not have reached the appealability question. Justice Scalia's concurring opinion suggested future reconsideration of the common practice of ruling on underlying issues before granting qualified immunity. And Justice Kennedy dissented that the appeal should be allowed, even when "it does seem that clarification is required" for an underlying constitutional ruling.

== See also ==
- Saucier v. Katz
- Ashcroft v. al-Kidd
