= Pepper v. United States =

- Supreme Court of the United States

Argued December 6, 2010 Decided March 2, 2011
- Full case name: Jason Pepper v. United States
- Citations: 562 U.S. 476 (more) 131 S. Ct. 1229; 179 L. Ed. 2d 196; 2011 U.S. LEXIS 1902
- Argument: Oral argument

Case history
- Prior: Defendant sentenced, unreported (N.D. Iowa); remanded for resentencing in light of United States v. Booker, 412 F.3d 995 (Pepper I; 8th Cir., 2005); new sentence vacated and remanded, 486 F.3d 408 (Pepper II; 8th Cir., 2007); vacated and remanded in light of Gall v. United States, 552 U.S. 1089 (2008); Pepper II remand confirmed, 518 F.3d 949 (Pepper III, 8th. Cir., 2008); third resentencing affirmed, 570 F.3d 958 (Pepper IV, 8th. Cir., 2009); certiorari granted, 561 U.S. 1024

Holding
- Original District Court decisions relating to sentencing the defendant were compatible with federal sentencing guidelines, as judges may consider a defendant's rehabilitation during the resentencing process.

Court membership
- Chief Justice John Roberts Associate Justices Antonin Scalia · Anthony Kennedy; Clarence Thomas · Ruth Bader Ginsburg; Stephen Breyer · Samuel Alito; Sonia Sotomayor · Elena Kagan

Case opinions
- Majority: Sotomayor, joined by Roberts, Scalia, Kennedy, Ginsburg; Breyer, Alito (Part III)
- Concurrence: Breyer (in part)
- Concur/dissent: Alito
- Dissent: Thomas
- Kagan took no part in the consideration or decision of the case.

Laws applied
- 18 U.S.C. § 3553

Pepper v. United States, 562 U.S. 476 (2011), is a 2011 decision by the Supreme Court of the United States concerning whether a United States District Court properly handled the sentencing of a former methamphetamine dealer. He was originally sentenced to 24 months in prison, far shorter than what federal guidelines generally specify for crimes of that nature. Prosecutors appealed the case to the United States Court of Appeals for the Eighth Circuit, which remanded the case back to the United States District Court for the Northern District of Iowa, which affirmed the original sentence after testimony relating the defendant's rehabilitation. The case was appealed to the Eighth Circuit again, and was again remanded. A different District Court judge gave him a 65-month sentence. The defendant then brought the case back to the Eighth Circuit, which confirmed the later ruling, and to then to the Supreme Court. Sonia Sotomayor wrote the opinion of the court, which ruled in favor of the defendant.
