= Brandon Mayfield =

American lawyer

Brandon Mayfield (born July 15, 1966) is an American lawyer who was incorrectly detained in connection with the 2004 Madrid train bombings on the basis of a faulty fingerprint match. On May 4, 2004, the FBI arrested Mayfield as a material witness in connection with the Madrid attacks, and held him for two weeks, before releasing him with a public apology following Spanish authorities identifying another suspect.

A United States DOJ internal review later acknowledged serious errors in the FBI investigation. Ensuing lawsuits resulted in a $2 million settlement. An initial ruling declared some provisions of the USA PATRIOT Act unconstitutional, but the United States government appealed, and the ruling was overturned on appeal for lack of standing. Mayfield's case has been referenced in numerous scientific, political, and social journals.

== Early life and career ==
Brandon Mayfield was born in Coos Bay, Oregon, and grew up in Halstead, Kansas. He served in the United States Army Reserve from 1985 to 1989, and then as an officer in the Army in Bitburg, Germany, from 1992 to 1994. He met his wife Mona, an Egyptian national and the daughter of a college professor, on a blind date in Olympia, Washington, in 1986, and converted to Islam shortly afterwards. They have lived in Beaverton, Oregon, off and on since 1989. Although he was a regular worshiper at a Beaverton mosque prior to his arrest, some of his colleagues were unaware of his religious beliefs. The imam of the mosque has described Mayfield as "very patriotic". The Mayfields have four children. He studied law at Washburn University and Lewis & Clark College, receiving his Juris Doctor degree from Washburn University School of Law in 1999, and practicing family law in Newport before moving to the Portland area. Mayfield performed work for the Modest Means Program of the Oregon State Bar, which matches attorneys who are willing to work at reduced rates for low-income clients. In 2003, he offered child custody legal aid to Jeffrey Leon Battle, one of the Portland Seven, a group of people convicted of trying to travel to Afghanistan to help the Taliban.

== False accusation in 2004 bombing ==
=== Arrest and detention ===
Following the 2004 Madrid train bombings, fingerprints on a bag containing detonating devices were found by Spanish authorities. The Spanish National Police shared the fingerprints with the FBI through Interpol. Twenty possible matches for one of the fingerprints were found in the FBI database and one of the possible matches was Brandon Mayfield. His prints were in the FBI database as they were taken as part of standard procedure when he joined the military. He became the prime suspect because of his conversion to Islam and because he had represented one of the Portland Seven.

The FBI concluded that the fingerprints were a "100 percent match" on March 20, 2004. According to the court documents in the Honorable Judge Ann Aiken's decision, this information was largely "fabricated and concocted by the FBI and DOJ." The FBI finally sent Mayfield's fingerprints to the Spanish authorities on April 2, but in an April 13 memo, the Spanish authorities contested the matching of the fingerprints from Brandon Mayfield to the ones associated with the Madrid bombing. Further, the Spanish authorities informed the FBI they had other suspects in the case, Moroccan immigrants not linked to anyone in the US. The FBI continued surveillance of Mayfield and his family despite the information received from the Spanish authorities, and misrepresented to a secret FISA court that the Spanish authorities had simply ruled Mayfield's match "inconclusive" when in fact they had deemed it "negative."

Mayfield was concerned for the safety of his children and wife, and according to his father, he suspected that he was under surveillance by the federal authorities. In the weeks before his arrest, Mayfield's family was under the impression that their house had been broken into at least twice, although nothing was stolen. According to court documents, the FBI used national security letters in order to wiretap his phones, bug his house, and search his house several times, including collecting personal hygiene products to test for DNA.

As was discovered during the court case, the FBI's records show that this fingerprint, despite the sworn testimony of FBI and DOJ agents, was not an exact match but only one of 20 prints "similar" to the ones retrieved from Madrid. Based on that list of people with "similar prints" the FBI launched an extensive investigation of all 20 individuals using letters of national security. The investigation included medical records, financial records, employment records, etc. on all 20 people and their families. It was during this investigation that Brandon Mayfield's name rose to the top of the list.

On May 6, the FBI arrested Mayfield at his office in Beaverton, a suburb of Portland. The arrest was similar to the contemporary Mike Hawash case, under a material witness warrant rather than under charge; he was held with no access to family and limited access, if any, to legal counsel. The FBI initially refused to inform either Mayfield or his family why he was being detained or where he was being held. His family found out the extent of the allegations by watching the news, learning that someone had leaked the nature of the FBI investigation to the Associated Press, precipitating the rushed arrest.

He was at first held at a Multnomah County jail under a false name; he was later transferred to an unidentified location. His family protested that Mayfield had no connection with the bombings, his passport was expired, he was at home on the day of the attack, and had not been off the continent in over 11 to 14 years.

=== Release ===
Before his arrest, Spanish authorities informed the FBI in a letter dated April 13, 2004, that they reviewed the fingerprint on the bag as a negative match of Mayfield's fingerprint, though this letter was not communicated to Mayfield's attorneys. On May 19 the Spanish authorities announced that the fingerprints actually belonged to an Algerian national, Ouhnane Daoud; Brandon Mayfield was released from prison when the international press broke the story the next day—May 20, 2004. A gag order remained in force for the next few days. By May 25, the case was dismissed by the judge.

The FBI conducted an internal review of Mayfield's arrest and detention, concluding that although he was not arrested solely due to his religious beliefs, they may have contributed to the investigator's failure to take into account the Spanish concerns over fingerprint identification. The FBI issued a press release announcing the report's conclusion that they had not misused the USA PATRIOT Act in the investigation. Civil libertarians and the ACLU nonetheless consider Mayfield's detention a misuse of the material witness statute.

The FBI later admitted wrongdoing and apologized for their acts. In response, on October 4, 2004, Mayfield filed a lawsuit over this invasion of his privacy. He sought an injunction to force the government to return or destroy copies of items seized from his home and challenged the law which was used against him as unconstitutional. The Federal Government filed several motions to have Mayfield's case dismissed as a matter of national security, or national secrets, but these were denied on July 28, 2005, by Judge Ann Aiken.

=== Court's ruling and aftermath ===
The case was heard by the Ninth Circuit Court of Appeals. Among the issues on appeal was whether materials removed from Mayfield's house, including DNA samples taken from his family's personal toothbrushes, were to be destroyed or preserved. The Federal Government assumed the position that materials must be preserved so that they can be referred to, if more lawsuits are brought in the future.

On November 29, 2006, the U.S. government settled part of the lawsuit with Mayfield for a reported $2 million. The government issued a formal apology to Mayfield as part of the settlement. The settlement allowed Mayfield to pursue a legal challenge against the Patriot Act. The FBI investigated itself and found no wrongdoing.

On September 26, 2007, two provisions of the Patriot Act were declared unconstitutional by the United States District Court for the District of Oregon. Finding in Mayfield's favor, Judge Aiken ruled that the Foreign Intelligence Surveillance Act, as amended by the Patriot Act, "now permits the executive branch of government to conduct surveillance and searches of American citizens without satisfying the probable cause requirements of the Fourth Amendment," which violates the Constitution of the United States. The Federal government appealed that ruling, and Mayfield's attorney, Elden Rosenthal, argued in front of the Ninth Circuit court on February 5, 2009. The ruling was overturned in December 2009 on the ground that the Court found the plaintiff, Mayfield, not to have standing. Mayfield appealed this decision to the Supreme Court, but was denied certiorari on November 1, 2010.

== Subsequent work ==
Between 2015 and 2017, Mayfield participated in a campaign with CAIR, the ACLU, and the National Lawyers Guild to press for the Portland City Council to sever ties with the Joint Terrorism Task Force, citing surveillance and immigration issues.

In 2018 Brandon Mayfield represented Yonas Fikre before the Ninth Circuit Court of Appeals, successfully persuading the court that damages done to the man by his placement on the No Fly List and interference with his attempts to return to the United States gave him standing to challenge the unconstitutionality of the policy.

== See also ==
- Shirley McKie, misidentified fingerprint
- New York State Police Troop C scandal, fabricated crime scene fingerprints
