= Steven McGeady =

American computer programmer

- Born: March 17, 1957 (age 69); Baltimore, Maryland, U.S.
- Education: Reed College
- Occupations: Chairman, ShiftWise, Corporate Vice President of Intel (retired 2000)

Steven McGeady is a former Intel executive best known as a witness in the Microsoft antitrust trial. His notes and testimony contained colorful quotes by Microsoft executives threatening to "cut off Netscape's air supply" and Bill Gates' guess that "this antitrust thing will blow over". Attorney David Boies said that McGeady's testimony showed him to be "an extremely conscientious, capable and honest witness", while Microsoft portrayed him as someone with an "axe to grind". McGeady left Intel in 2000, but later again gained notoriety for defending his former employee Mike Hawash after his arrest on federal terrorism charges. From its founding in 2002 until its sale in November 2013, he was Chairman of Portland-based healthcare technology firm ShiftWise. He is a member of the Reed College Board of Trustees, the Portland Art Museum Board of Trustees, and the PNCA Board of Governors, and lives in Portland, Oregon.

== Early life ==
Steven McGeady was born in Baltimore, Maryland. His father was a manager for Bethlehem Steel. After high school in Michigan City, Indiana he briefly attended Purdue University. Then in 1976, he enrolled at Reed College in Portland, Oregon. While attending Reed College from 1976 to 1980, he studied Physics and Philosophy but did not graduate. The majority of his time was occupied at the school's computer center where he and friends would experiment with a Digital Equipment Corporation (DEC) PDP-11/70 computer donated by Howard Vollum, the founder of Tektronix. Reed's computer was the first in the Northwest to run the Unix operating system, allowing McGeady to become an early developer in that environment.

After college, McGeady was a software engineering manager at Ann Arbor Terminals and Oregon based Tektronix. In 1985 he joined Intel, and in 1991 he co-founded the Intel Architecture Labs in Hillsboro. In 1993, he was promoted to a vice president position at the company.

== Intel ==
At the time of his departure in June 2000, McGeady was Vice President of Intel's New Business Group. During 15 years at Intel, he led a variety of software, marketing, and investment initiatives for Intel, including the i960 RISC microprocessor software development, Intel's digital video and multimedia research, Intel's first Internet development group, and a group focused on Internet-based healthcare delivery.

McGeady was a co-founder of the Intel Architecture Labs, a research and development group focused on advancing the personal-computer platform. McGeady ran the software, multimedia, data security, and Internet programs within this group for most of the 1990s. His group developed Intel's ProShare video-conferencing technology, the Indeo video compression technology, and Intel's Display Control Interface and VxD graphics software, later licensed to Microsoft to form the core of DirectX. His research group worked with the MIT Media Lab, Xerox PARC, and other groups, and developed early prototypes of digital video recorders (DVRs), video broadcast servers, and other technologies.

As manager of the i960 software development tools team from 1986 to 1996, McGeady was an early developer and promoter of open-source software, beginning with Richard Stallman's GNU C compiler and tools. McGeady wrote the i960 target for GNU Compiler Collection (gcc) and led the team that developed a suite of tools including a globally optimizing, trace-driven optimizer for gcc and the first GNU Debugger (gdb) port to a remote, stand-alone system. He hired Cygnus Support to integrate those changes into the mainline GNU tools and to improve the tools' ability to deal with many object file formats.

McGeady was Vice-President of Intel's Multimedia, Communications, and Internet activities from 1990 through 1996, where he led the development of the first desktop video-compression software for the PC, Intel's early implementations of multimedia network broadcast protocols, the first products to combine television and web pages, online virtual communities, the Java language, and data security infrastructure.

As a software engineer and developer, McGeady was often a minority voice at hardware-dominated Intel. In 1996 he was asked by then-CEO Andy Grove to take a job as Grove's assistant and is the only known person to turn the job down. Grove later said that he and Intel would have grasped the importance of the Internet to the company more quickly had McGeady taken the job. McGeady had a less positive relationship with succeeding CEO Craig Barrett, reportedly telling Barrett to "pound sand" when Barrett instructed him not to testify in the Microsoft case.

== Microsoft trials ==
In 1998, McGeady was a witness for the US Department of Justice in the U.S. vs. Microsoft antitrust case, where he testified about Microsoft's attempts to control Intel's software efforts as well as their behavior toward Netscape and Sun's Javasoft. He was the only executive from the PC industry to testify for the government. McGeady testified that Microsoft opposed Intel's 1995 work on a new technology called Native Signal Processing, which would have used instructions from Intel's chips, rather than software code from Microsoft, to run multimedia and communications programs more quickly.

McGeady testified for the government and against Microsoft despite pressure from inside Intel. Intel's then-COO Craig Barrett instructed McGeady not to cooperate with Department of Justice attorneys, but "He [told] Barrett to go stuff it".

McGeady also claimed in his testimony that Microsoft Vice-President Paul Maritz had described, in a meeting at Intel, Microsoft's plan to "embrace, extend, [and] extinguish" the HTML standard until it would be incompatible with the Netscape browser. While this term had some currency before his 1998 testimony, this was its first prominent public exposure. Documents presented by the government showed Microsoft was concerned about McGeady: "Steve McGeady remains an issue for us. He is a champion of Java and a believer that the day of bloatware is over", wrote Microsoft VP Paul Maritz in an email to Bill Gates. "He has more IQ than most [people at Intel]".

In November 1998, McGeady testified that Microsoft leveraged its monopoly power in Windows to impede Intel's ability to compete with Microsoft in areas involving system software and influence of OEMs:

- McGeady testified that Microsoft feared competition from Intel's software development: At an August 2, 1995 meeting Bill Gates allegedly threatened to terminate Windows support for Intel's new microprocessors unless they were able to "get alignment" between Intel and MS on Intel's Internet and communications software programs, and Gates allegedly told Andy Grove to shut down the Intel Architecture Labs, the organization driving Intel's Internet program.
- McGeady testified that Microsoft was upset that Intel "shifting the software boundary" without Microsoft's permission: IAL's development of Native Signal Processing (NSP) program caused this concern. NSP was a layer of software that interfaced with both the Windows OS and the hardware in order to support real-time audio, real-time video, and 3D graphics. According to McGeady, NSP threatened Microsoft because it was software at the operating system level, while Microsoft believed they "owned software to the metal", (i.e., to the hardware level). (10AM17, 12PM13) Ultimately, Andy Grove admitted that Intel "caved" by retracting NSP.
- Microsoft was concerned about IAL: Gates allegedly said regarding Intel Architecture Labs: "Having 700 software engineers running around in the industry is an okay thing as long as Microsoft knows what they're doing first". According to McGeady, they did not want to relinquish control over any application interfaces to Intel. To take advantage of multimedia hardware, Intel was writing device drivers that allowed application developers direct control of (e.g.) graphics and video devices. To prevent this Microsoft threatened to continue bad-mouthing IAL's software and to withhold support for Intel's MMX microprocessor.
- McGeady testified that Microsoft used its monopoly power in Windows to restrict support for Netscape and Java, and to their plans to compete with Netscape through predatory pricing, through the leveraging of their Windows OS monopoly, and through the creation of incompatible HTML standards:
  - Netscape: McGeady testified that Microsoft generally discouraged Intel from working with Netscape, and that Gates allegedly urged Grove to push Intel's internal information technology group away from Netscape's server toward Microsoft's IIS, and stressed that it was "very important" that Intel "NOT ever publicly say they are standardizing on Netscape browsers". McGeady testified to Microsoft's three-prong strategy to defeat Netscape: they allegedly stated that they would "cut off Netscape's air supply" by giving away Internet Explorer for free, preventing Netscape from deriving any revenue from its browser; that Microsoft asserted they would "fight with the OS and the apps arm", meaning they would create dependencies between Windows and the browser that would create advantages for their browser over Netscape's; and MS's professed strategy of "embrace, extend, extinguish", planning to "extend" the HTML standard to the point where it would be incompatible with the Netscape browser.
  - Java: McGeady testified that Microsoft made it clear to Intel that support for Java would be a "show stopper" in Intel's relationship with Microsoft, threatening to terminate cooperation that Intel required for new microprocessors. Microsoft allegedly proposed that Intel help them prevent the Java component model from becoming a de facto standard by developing a Java system incompatible with Sun's, defeating Java's "write once, run anywhere" capabilities, and tying Java to Windows. Microsoft would distribute this Java virtual machine as part of Internet Explorer, a variant of MS's "embrace, extend, extinguish" strategy. When Microsoft learned that McGeady's group at Intel had implemented its own Java VM and multimedia class libraries that ran very fast on the Intel architecture, Microsoft became very upset. McGeady testified that Microsoft pressed Intel to stop this work.

The DoJ made four major arguments based on McGeady's testimony:

1. Intel and its software development effort were hampered by Microsoft's bully tactics;
2. Microsoft used Intel against Netscape in the "Browser Wars";
3. McGeady was an expert witness on software standards, innovation and competition; and
4. McGeady felt Microsoft hampered Java development.

Microsoft, in their response to McGeady's testimony, made the point that his testimony contained several pro-Microsoft threads and that Intel practiced similar cross-product subsidization, distributing free Intel Architecture Labs software funded by microprocessor revenues. They also claimed that Microsoft's influence over Intel and its microprocessors was unrelated to the downstream software segment.

Cross-examination of McGeady revealed conflicting interpretations of many Microsoft/Intel meetings, differing reasons for Intel's decisions, and for McGeady's anti-Microsoft bias:

1. Microsoft defended its attempts to coordinate strategy with Intel and tried to dispel the bully image;
2. Microsoft presented reasons for the discontinuation of Intel's Native Signal Processing initiative;
3. Microsoft highlighted Intel practices that resemble Microsoft's alleged anti-competitive behavior;
4. Microsoft defended its Java program; and
5. Microsoft aggressively attacked McGeady to discredit him as a witness.

McGeady's notes suggested that portions of his testimony could be considered embellishments or stories heard in other contexts, and he was frequently forced to suggest that he had a recollection of meetings and conversations superior to that of other Intel officials, as well as Netscape officers. Microsoft revealed Intel documents that painted McGeady as a "prima donna" who was criticized for his department's belligerence toward Microsoft.

Microsoft claimed that McGeady's actions suggested that he considered himself above Intel policy and an extra-corporate defender of truth and justice in the Internet world, and McGeady openly suggested that Intel's interference with Microsoft would aid the industry. McGeady admitted leaking confidential information to The New York Times journalist John Markoff and met with Netscape's Jim Clark to keep Netscape from being complacent about the threat from Microsoft. Documents show McGeady envisioning entrapping Microsoft in an antitrust suit, and later he indirectly volunteered to testify against Microsoft.

McGeady was called again to testify in the 2001 remedy phase of the Microsoft trial.

== Other activities ==
During 1996/97, McGeady was a visiting researcher at the MIT Media Lab, pursuing research on emergent and self-organizing behavior in computer networks. During this time he was a keynote speaker at the first Harvard Conference on the Internet and Society. His speech from the event, "The Digital Reformation: Freedom, Risk, Responsibility" was reprinted in the Harvard Journal of Law and Technology, and is credited by some as formulating early theories regarding what became social media.

During 1997 and 1998, McGeady was a member of the National Research Council Computer Science and Technology Board Committee on Information Systems Trustworthiness, and is a co-author of its book on the subject.

== Mike Hawash case ==
McGeady entered the news again in 2003 because of his defense of his former Intel employee Mike Hawash who was arrested at Intel in early 2003. McGeady organized a defense fund and protested Hawash's 6-week incommunicado detention without charge. Hawash ultimately pleaded guilty to conspiring to aid the Taliban in fighting against U.S. forces in Afghanistan, and received a reduced sentence in the so-called Portland Seven case in exchange for testifying against some of his co-conspirators.
