= Real 3D =

Real 3D may refer to:

- Real3D, a former graphics processor chip developer
- Real 3D, now known as Realsoft 3D, 3D modeling software
- RealD 3D, a brand name for technology used in 3D films
