= DC5 =

DC5, DC-5, or DC 5 may refer to:

- Douglas DC-5, a twin-propeller passenger aircraft
- Honda Integra (fourth generation), chassis code DC5, a Japanese Sports car known as the Acura RSX in North America
- The D.C. Five, five U.S. citizens convicted by Pakistan of plotting terrorist attacks
- The Dave Clark Five, a British rock group
- DC5, municipality code for Central Karoo District Municipality, South Africa
- District of Columbia Route 5 (DC 5), a part of state highway Maryland Route 5 from 1939 to 1949
- DC-5, a game offered by the D.C. Lottery
- Defense Condition 5, a well known team from the Battlefield series
