= Kent Ford =

Kent Ford may refer to:

- Kent Ford (activist) (born 1943), activist who co-founded the Portland, Oregon chapter of the Black Panther Party
- Kent Ford (astronomer) (1931–2023), astronomer involved with the theory of dark matter
- Kent Ford (canoeist) (born 1957), former American slalom canoeist
