= Digital video (disambiguation) =

Digital video may refer to:

- Digital video, recording of video as digital data
- DV (Digital Video), a family of codecs and tape formats used for storing digital video
- Digital Video Interactive, the first multimedia desktop video standard for IBM-compatible personal computers
- Digital cinematography, the process of shooting motion pictures
- Digital Visual Interface (DVI), an interface (connector) for video displays (monitors)
