= Detention of Ayub Ali Khan and Mohammed Jaweed Azmath =

September 11 false accusation case

Mohammed Jaweed Azmath
- Born: c. 1970 (age 55–56); India

Ayub Ali Khan
- Born: Gul Mohammed Shah c. 1970 (age 55–56); India
- Spouse: Tasleem Murad

Mohammed Jaweed Azmath and Ayub Ali Khan (also known as Syed Gul Mohamed Shah) are two Indian men who were wrongly accused of involvement in the September 11 terrorist attacks.

== Detention ==
One day after the September 11th attacks, the men were detained in Texas for possible immigration violations. Their apartment in Jersey City was searched the following weekend. According to The Washington Post, writing one week after the attacks, "Mohammed Jaweed Azmath, 47, and Ayub Ali Khan, 51, both from India, were taken into custody Wednesday on an Amtrak train in Texas, carrying $5,000 in cash, hair dye and box cutter knives -- weapons said to have been used by the hijackers." The subjects were profiled as potential drug smugglers because they purchased train tickets with cash immediately before departure, and appeared nervous when questioned.

As of October 25, 2001, the men were being held in New York as material witnesses. Investigators said they had offered Azmath, Khan, Zacarias Moussaoui and Nabil al-Marabh "the prospect of reduced sentences, money, jobs and new identities within the US" if they assisted investigation into the attacks, while threatening to inject them with a "truth serum", identified as sodium pentothal, or to transfer them to countries with more brutal interrogation techniques. (see also torture by proxy, extraordinary rendition) The four men were cited by a number of media pundits raising discussion of whether torture should be practiced within the United States, and whether it would be effective.

In December 2001, The New York Times reported that 'three months of intensive investigation' had failed to link the men with the attack. The men's circumstance appeared to be coincidence - they had lost their employment managing news stands in Newark, and were relocating to Texas to open or work at a fruit stand. They had used box cutters to open bundles of newspapers. After their flight to San Antonio was stopped in St. Louis after the attacks, they boarded a train to complete the trip, which was stopped for a "routine drug search".

Though cleared of involvement in the attacks, prosecutors charged them with an unrelated case of "fraud involving several hundred thousand dollars of unpaid credit card charges." The men made a plea bargain, as arguing for their innocence would have left them in jail much longer than confessing their guilt. They had agreed afterward to be deported for immigration violations.

Both men alleged ill-treatment in custody, the first 12 months of which they spent in solitary confinement. According to Azmath, "I was made to stand in freezing temperatures in the open for four to five hours a day to force me to confess to a crime I had not committed." According to Khan's lawyer, each time he was brought to court he was thrown, while shackled, against a wall. After reaching India they filed suit against the United States.

== Aftermath ==
Following their deportation, both men were charged in India with passport violations. According to the Times of India, the men were accused of obtaining fake passports from a corrupt passport agent, and Khan's true name was Gul Mohammed Shah, and Azmath had listed his age as 50 rather than 30. The Times reported that Azmath's wife, Tasleem Murad, had told them that he was not the first person to misstate his age to obtain a visa and "He did not have any evil intentions and he has paid for it already." An additional issue was that Azmath's wife, being Pakistani, did not have Indian citizenship.

The 2002 Pulitzer Prize for National Reporting was awarded to a September 29 article in The Washington Post by Dan Eggen and Bob Woodward, which mentioned the detention of Khan and Azmath and reported that an anonymous source said that "Both men had flight training".
