= Habis Abdulla al Saoub =

Jordanian member of Al-Qaeda (1965–2003)

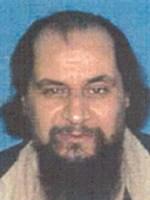
FBI photo of al Saoub

Habis Abdulla al Saoub, a.k.a. Abu Tarek, (November 19, 1965 – October 2003) was a Jordanian national and member of the Portland Seven, and later a member of an al Qaeda cell. In February 2003, he was added to the FBI Seeking Information - War on Terrorism list, wanted in connection with a federal grand jury indictment returned on October 3, 2002, in United States District Court for the District of Oregon at Portland, Oregon, in which he was charged with conspiracy to levy war against the United States, conspiracy to provide material support and resources to al-Qaeda, conspiracy to contribute services to al-Qaeda and the Taliban, and possessing firearms in furtherance of crimes of violence. The FBI offered a five million dollar reward for his capture.

He was killed by Pakistani forces in October 2003.

== Portland Seven fugitive ==
On September 29, 2001, al Saoub and others were discovered while engaged in shooting practice in a gravel pit in Skamania County, Washington. The group was discovered by Deputy Sheriff Mark Mercer who was acting on a tip from a neighbor who had heard gunfire in the pit. Deputy Mercer let the men go after taking their names and reported the incident to the FBI. Al Saoub was believed by the FBI to have then fled the United States on October 17, 2001.

Patrice Lumumba Ford, Jeffrey Leon Battle, October Martinique Lewis (Battle's ex-wife), Muhammad Ibrahim Bilal, Ahmed Ibrahim Bilal, Maher "Mike" Hawash, and Habis Abdulla al Saoub made up the original seven members wanted by the FBI. The members of the Portland Seven "were all named in the 15-count superseding indictment that included charges of conspiracy to levy war against the United States, conspiracy to provide material support and resources to al Qaeda, conspiracy to contribute services to al Qaeda and the Taliban, conspiracy to possess and discharge firearms in furtherance of crimes of violence, possessing firearms in furtherance of crimes of violence and money laundering."

According to the indictment, on October 17, 2001, Battle and al Saoub flew out of Portland International Airport en route to Afghanistan.

In November 2001 and January 2002, Ford wired money to al Saoub in China.

The six male members of the group travelled to China in early 2002, with the intent of entering Afghanistan to aid the Taliban. Lacking visas and other documentation, they were turned back, and all but al Saoub then returned again to the United States.

On Thursday, October 3, 2002, a federal grand jury in United States District Court for the District of Oregon, at Portland, Oregon, indicted Battle, Ford, the two Bilals, al Saoub and Lewis. On October 4, 2002 the FBI in Portland, Oregon announced the arrest of four of those original six on charges of aiding and, in some cases, trying to join al-Qaeda fighters. The remaining two, Ahmed Bilal and al Saoub were both considered fugitives.

Al Saoub remained in the Afghanistan region after the other members of the Portland Seven had left. He was subsequently wired $2,000 by Maher "Mike" Hawash.

Hawash indicated that he was moved to join the Portland Seven by al Saoub.

According to the Seattle Post Intelligencer, the indictment against Saoub said he discarded a bag containing a Jordanian passport and a document titled "A Martyr's Will," before traveling to Afghanistan to join forces with Taliban and al Qaeda troops.

Al Saoub was killed in October 2003. Pakistani officials said the mission was aimed at an al Qaeda group suspected of crossing into Afghanistan to attack a U.S. base near the remote town of Shkin. Three U.S. soldiers had been killed in that area in late August 2003.

Saoub was ultimately removed from the FBI list on June 24, 2004.

Ford and Battle are each serving eighteen-year sentences. Lewis was sentenced to three years in a federal prison camp. Muhammad Bilal received an eight-year sentence, while Ahmed Bilal got ten years. Hawash was sentenced to seven years.
