= Ashcroft v. al-Kidd =

- Supreme Court of the United States

Argued March 2, 2011 Decided May 31, 2011
- Full case name: John D. Ashcroft, Petitioner v. Abdullah al-Kidd
- Citations: 563 U.S. 731 (more) 131 S. Ct. 2074; 179 L. Ed. 2d 1149

Case history
- Prior: Al-Kidd v. Ashcroft, 580 F.3d 949 (9th Cir. 2009); rehearing en banc denied, 598 F.3d 1129 (9th Cir. 2010); cert. granted, 562 U.S. 980 (2010).

Holding
- United States Attorney General John D. Ashcroft could not be personally sued for his involvement in the federal detention of Abdullah al-Kidd, an American citizen, in the wake of the September 11 attacks.

Court membership
- Chief Justice John Roberts Associate Justices Antonin Scalia · Anthony Kennedy; Clarence Thomas · Ruth Bader Ginsburg; Stephen Breyer · Samuel Alito; Sonia Sotomayor · Elena Kagan

Case opinions
- Majority: Scalia, joined by Roberts, Kennedy, Thomas, Alito
- Concurrence: Kennedy, joined by Ginsburg, Breyer, Sotomayor (Part I)
- Concurrence: Ginsburg (in judgment), joined by Breyer, Sotomayor
- Concurrence: Sotomayor (in judgment), joined by Ginsburg, Breyer
- Kagan took no part in the consideration or decision of the case.

Ashcroft v. al-Kidd, 563 U.S. 731 (2011), is a United States Supreme Court case in which the Court held that U.S. Attorney General John D. Ashcroft could not be personally sued for his involvement in the detention of a U.S. citizen in the wake of the September 11, 2001 attacks in the United States.

== Background ==
The plaintiff, Abdullah al-Kidd (born Lavoni T. Kidd in Wichita, Kansas), was an American citizen and a prominent football player at the University of Idaho. While at college, Kidd converted to Islam and adopted the name Abdullah al-Kidd. Al-Kidd was arrested by federal agents in 2003 at Dulles International Airport. He was travelling to Saudi Arabia to attend school. He was held for two weeks under the federal material-witness statute and controlled by supervised release for 13 months because he was to testify in the trial of Sami Omar Al-Hussayen. The latter was tried and acquitted on charges of supporting terrorist organizations.

At the time of al-Kidd's arrest, the FBI Director Robert Mueller told Congress that it was one of the FBI's "success" stories. Al-Kidd was never charged or called as a witness, and he was ultimately released. As a result of his arrest, al-Kidd lost his job and a research scholarship, and he also claimed that it led to the end of his marriage.

Al-Kidd filed suit against John Ashcroft, who was U.S. Attorney General from 2001 to 2005. Al-Kidd alleges that he was denied access to a lawyer, shackled, and strip-searched. The American Civil Liberties Union, which represented al-Kidd, claim that he is one of 70 Muslim men who were similarly treated.

The federal government said that Ashcroft has absolute immunity from such civil suits because he was acting within the scope of his duties as U.S. Attorney General. In the alternative, Ashcroft has qualified immunity that prevents such suits unless the official violated a right that was clearly established at the time of the violation.

In 2009, the U.S. Court of Appeals for the Ninth Circuit found that Ashcroft could personally be sued and held responsible for al-Kidd's wrongful detention. On October 18, 2010, the United States Supreme Court agreed to hear Ashcroft's appeal of the Ninth Circuit's ruling.

== Opinion of the Court ==
On May 31, 2011, the Supreme Court, in an 8–0 ruling, stated that al-Kidd's lawyers had not met the high burden of proof needed to show that Attorney General Ashcroft could be personally sued, that he was directly involved or had explicit knowledge of the events (suggesting the matter was handled mostly by distant subordinates). The ACLU had sued him personally because it is very hard to sue a senior agent of the government in his or her official capacity (unless an individual commits a felony or other serious crime, in which case an elected official may be impeached) because American government bodies enjoy immunity from being sued. In the majority opinion written by Justice Scalia, the court ruled that "Qualified immunity gives government officials breathing room to make reasonable but mistaken judgments about open legal questions. When properly applied, it protects all but the plainly incompetent or those who knowingly violate the law. Ashcroft deserves neither label" (internal citation omitted).

Justice Kagan did not participate in the case as she had previously worked on the government's preparation of its case while serving in the Obama administration.

== Effect of the decision ==
The case is widely viewed as broadening the protection that qualified immunity affords to officials, and eroding civil liberties.

== See also ==
- List of United States Supreme Court cases, volume 563
