= Sami Omar Al-Hussayen =

- Born: 1973 (age 52–53); Saudi Arabia
- Detained at: Idaho
- Penalty: acquitted
- Status: deported
- Occupation: Professor of Computer Science

Sami Omar Al-Hussayen (born 1973, Saudi Arabia), also known as Sami Al-Hussayen, is a teacher at a technical college in Riyadh. As a Ph.D. graduate student in computer science at the University of Idaho in the United States, he was arrested and charged in 2003 by the United States with running websites as a webmaster that were linked to organizations that support terrorism. Al-Hussayen is one of the few people at the time to have been charged under a provision that has been described as "overly broad and vague." He was also charged with immigration violations.

U.S. v. Al-Hussayen is considered a landmark case for civil liberties, related to provisions of the USA Patriot Act in the United States. It was the first time that the government tried to use the material support statutes "to prosecute conduct that consisted almost exclusively of operating and maintaining websites."

Idaho's senior U.S. senator and one of its congressmen, both Republicans, had already proposed amendments to the Act because of their concerns about its effects on civil liberties.

At an immigration hearing in 2003, the federal judge ordered Al-Hussayen deported. He was held in the United States to face terrorism and immigration charges, and was tried in 2004. He was acquitted that year of the three federal terrorism charges, which was considered a "stinging defeat" for the government; he was also acquitted of three of eight immigration charges. The jury was deadlocked on the other immigration charges, and the judge called a mistrial.

Al-Hussayen accepted a deal, agreeing to deportation if the prosecutor dropped plans to retry him on the outstanding immigration charges. His wife and three sons returned to Riyadh, Saudi Arabia before him, and he was deported in July 2004. He and his wife both work in Riyadh.

== Arrest and charges ==
Sami Omar Al-Hussayen was arrested in late February 2003 in the town of Moscow, Idaho, where he lived since 1999 as a Ph.D. graduate student in computer science at the University of Idaho. His wife and three sons were with him.

The federal government had two cases against him: federal charges related to support of terrorism, and one related to immigration issues. For the terrorism case, he was initially charged with seven counts of visa fraud, and four counts of lying to officials. All charges related to his alleged work as a webmaster, as a foreign student on a student visa in the United States is not allowed to work for an employer not situated on the student's campus. Al-Hussayen maintained that he did volunteer work and was not receiving pay, and thus did not violate the conditions of his visa. He pleaded not guilty to all the charges.

In March 2003, the court ruled that Al-Hussayen should be set free without bail and remain under house arrest until his trial. But, federal immigration officials detained him for their case, and he was transferred to their custody.

== Trials ==
At an immigration hearing in mid-2003, federal judge Anna Ho ordered Al-Hussayen to be deported to Saudi Arabia, his country of origin. He was held in federal custody pending a trial on terrorism and immigration charges, and he continued to work on his doctoral program while in jail.

In January 2004, US officials charged him with two federal counts of conspiracy to provide material support to terrorists by using his skills in computers. In March 2004, he was charged with conspiracy to provide material support to Hamas, designated a terrorist organization by the US, through donation links on Web sites which he allegedly maintained. His formal indictments can be seen here.

His trial began in April 2004 and he was defended by the attorney David Nevin. The trial of Al-Hussayen lasted seven weeks. The defense called only one witness. He was acquitted of all three terrorism charges, which was described as a "stinging defeat" for the government.

He was acquitted of three of the eight immigration charges. As the jurors deadlocked on the remaining charges, District Judge Edward Lodge declared a mistrial for those remaining charges. The remaining immigration charges would have to be retried.

== Deportation ==
After his acquittal at the criminal trial, Al-Hussayen was still held in custody by immigration authorities. A few weeks later, he agreed not to appeal his deportation order if the prosecution agreed not to retry him for the remaining immigration charges. He was deported to Saudi Arabia in July 2004. His wife and three sons returned there voluntarily to meet him, rather than await deportation orders.

Al-Hussayen and his family live in Riyadh. He works as an instructor at a technical university, and his wife works as a kindergarten teacher.

== Significance of the case ==
The USA Patriot Act of 2001 authorizes the federal government to prosecute people if they "provide expert advice or assistance" to terrorist groups. This question of guidance and association has troubled critics. Among them are two of Idaho's US Congressmen, who had already registered their opposition to provisions of the act: the Republicans Larry E. Craig, the senior U.S. senator, and Representative C. L. Otter, "have sponsored bills to amend the act, which they have called a threat to civil liberties."

In January 2004, the US District Court in Los Angeles, California had ruled in another case that this provision is unconstitutional, as it violates First and Fifth amendment rights. U.S. District Court Judge Audrey B. Collins ruled that the USA Patriot Act's language, barring "expert advice or assistance" to groups designated as foreign terrorist organizations, was "overly broad and vague."

"In that case, the judge ruled on behalf of several humanitarian groups that wanted to provide support to the nonviolent arms of two organizations designated as terrorist in Turkey and Sri Lanka. Judge Collins wrote that 'a woman who buys cookies at a bake sale outside her grocery store to support displaced Kurdish refugees to find new homes could be held liable' if the sale was sponsored by a group designated terrorist." She "did not extend her ruling beyond the one case in California."

Rand Lewis, the director of the Martin Institute for Peace Studies and Conflict Resolution and the Martin School of International Affairs at the University of Idaho, said regarding the prosecution of Al-Hussayen:

"We have a law that is shaky at best. My feeling is that Sami [U.S. v. Sami Omar Al-Hussayen] is going to be the test case in this," and "Passive supporters often don't know they're supporting terrorism. So when you get into these gray areas about what people know and what they don't know, I think the law is going to have a difficult time."

The US v. Al-Hussayen case has been considered a landmark test by civil libertarians. It was the first time that the government tried to use the material support statutes to prosecute activities that were mostly operating and maintaining websites. Supporters of Al-Hussayen said that he was not responsible for what linked websites published, nor for the material on the websites that he created, unless he wrote it himself. He is one of the few individuals until then to have been prosecuted under this provision of the law.

What became a national debate was centered on one question: "Were Al-Hussayen's Internet activities constitutionally protected free speech or did they cross the line into criminal and material support to terrorism?"

In an associated case, Ashcroft v. al-Kidd (2011), Abdullah al-Kidd, an American citizen and convert to Islam, was arrested in 2003 and held for 16 days in maximum security prisons. He was under supervised release (house arrest) for 13 months. The federal government was holding him as a material witness against Al-Hussayen. After finally being released, al-Kidd sued Attorney General John Ashcroft personally, in a case in which he was represented by lawyers from the American Civil Liberties Union (ACLU). They said that they knew of 70 other Muslim men who had been similarly detained in the early years following the 9/11 attacks. In 2009 the Ninth Circuit Court of Appeals in San Francisco ruled that Ashcroft could be sued and held personally responsible for the wrongful detention of al-Kidd.

In June 2011, the US Supreme Court overturned the lower court's decision, agreeing unanimously that Ashcroft cannot be personally sued, as he had immunity as a government official, unless he could be proven to have violated law. In addition, a majority ruled that al-Kidd could not have won his case on the merits. Stephen Vladeck, a professor at the American University School of Law, considered it a "narrow ruling" and said the court held that "Ashcroft did not, in fact, violate his [al-Kidd's] Fourth Amendment rights."
