= Jeffrey Battle =

American Islamist

Jeffrey Leon Battle was a member of a terrorist group dubbed the Portland Seven, some members of which attempted to travel to Afghanistan shortly after 9/11 in order to aid the Taliban. He refused to cooperate with the government and was sentenced to eighteen years in prison after pleading guilty to seditious conspiracy and levying war against the United States. He had two years added to his sentence for refusing to testify before a grand jury.

== Background ==
Jeffrey Leon Battle had a checkered past. According to an article in the Star-Ledger, "Battle was a ne'er-do-well, a one-time Mary Kay cosmetics representative who was trying to wriggle out of his commitment to the U.S. Army reserves after washing out in boot camp."

Jeffrey Leon Battle moved to Portland in the late 1990s from Houston, Texas, where he served as a bodyguard for New Black Panther leader and community activist Quanell X.

== First contact with law enforcement ==
On September 29, 2001, a group of men from what would later be termed the Portland Seven were engaged in shooting practice at a gravel pit in Skamania County, located in southern Washington, including Battle, Ford, al Saoub and Ali Khaled Steitiye, who was not a member of the Portland Seven but convicted in 2002 on firearms, fraud and immigration charges and testified against the others in 2004 as part of a plea agreement in a weapons-possession charge. The group was discovered by Deputy Sheriff Mark Mercer who was acting on a tip from a neighbor who had heard gunfire in the pit. Deputy Mercer let the men go after taking their names and reported the incident to the FBI. Battle was taped in a secretly recorded conversation indicating the members of the Portland Seven who were at the gravel pit had considered killing Deputy Mercer. “We was up there blowin it up … We was lightin’ it up … [W]e looked at it as worship because what our intentions were, to learn to shoot for. And a cop came up and he was like hey … you don’t understand how close he was gonna get popped … yeah, we was gonna pop him.” Battle later indicated they had opted not to kill the officer because he seemed "cool".

According to the indictment, on October 17, 2001, Battle and al Saoub flew out of Portland International Airport en route to Afghanistan. On October 20, 2001, Ford and the two Bilals also took the same route out of the United States. Between October 2001 and January 2002, Lewis wired a series of money orders to Battle in China and Bangladesh. In January 2002 Battle was administratively discharged from the military. Battle returned to the U.S. on or about February 5, 2002. The six male members of the group travelled to China in early 2002, with the intent of entering Afghanistan to aid the Taliban. Lacking visas and other documentation, they were turned back, and all but al Saoub then returned again to the United States.

On October 3, 2002, a federal grand jury in United States District Court for the District of Oregon in Portland, Oregon, indicted Battle, Ford, the two Bilals, al Saoub and Lewis. On October 4, 2002 the FBI in Portland, announced the arrest of four of those original six on charges of aiding and, in some cases, trying to join Al-Qaida fighters. Battle, Ford and Lewis were all arrested that morning in Portland.

== Trial ==
Battle and October Martinique Lewis, another member of the Portland Seven, were married in 1999, divorcing after five months (although they continued to live together). According to Lewis' mother, Lewis and Battle had worked in a Portland retirement home.

Battle's attorney said that Battle was motivated by a religious desire to help fellow Muslims. However, prosecutors maintain that Battle had earlier considered committing a different terrorist act in the United States. "He had said he wanted to kill hundreds of Jews at a Portland-area synagogue or Jewish school."

== Fate of other members of the Portland Seven ==
Patrice Lumumba Ford, Jeffrey Leon Battle, October Lewis, Muhammad Ibrahim Bilal, his brother Ahmed Ibrahim Bilal, Maher "Mike" Hawash, and Habis Abdulla al Saoub made up the original seven members wanted by the FBI. Al Saoub was killed by Pakistani forces in Afghanistan while part of an al Qaeda cell. Ford is also serving an eighteen-year sentence. Lewis was sentenced to three years in a federal prison camp. Muhammad Bilal got eight years while Ahmed Bilal got ten. Hawash was sentenced to seven years.
