= Ahmed Bilal =

Convicted American terrorist

Ahmed Ibrahim Bilal was a member of a terrorist group dubbed the Portland Seven, some members of which attempted to travel to Afghanistan shortly after the September 2001 attack on the World Trade Center (9/11) to aid the Taliban. He was indicted and arrested in Malaysia in October 2002. In 2003, he was sentenced to ten years imprisonment on gun charges and for conspiracy to aid the Taliban in fighting the multinational force in Afghanistan. He was released on June 27, 2011.

== Ahmed Bilal and the Portland Seven ==
Patrice Lumumba Ford, Jeffrey Leon Battle, October Martinique Lewis (Battle's ex-wife), his brother Muhammad Ibrahim Bilal, Maher "Mike" Hawash, and Habis Abdulla al Saoub were the original seven members wanted by the US FBI.

According to the FBI, in plea agreements Muhammad and Ahmed Bilal admitted to engaging in martial arts and firearms training to prepare themselves for military jihad in Afghanistan or elsewhere:

Both defendants [Muhammad and Ahmed Bilal] admit that on Oct. 20, 2001, while U.S. military forces were fighting al Qaeda and the Taliban in Afghanistan, co-defendant Maher Hawash took them and co-defendant Ford to the airport in Portland, where they flew to Hong Kong to meet with others. In the plea agreement, both defendants state that they entered into mainland China, went to Kashgar in Western China, and tried, unsuccessfully, to gain entrance into Pakistan.

On September 29, 2001, Battle, Ford and al Saoub were discovered while engaged in shooting practice in a gravel pit in Skamania County, Washington. Also present was Ali Khalid Steitiye, who was not indicted on terrorism charges, but was separately charged with other crimes.

According to the indictment, on October 17, 2001, Battle and al Saoub flew out of Portland International Airport en route to Afghanistan. On October 20, 2001, Ford and the two Bilals also took the same route out of the United States.

The six male members of the group travelled to China in early 2002, with the intent of entering Afghanistan to aid the Taliban. Lacking visas and other documentation, they were turned back, and all but al Saoub returned to the United States.

On Thursday, October 3, 2002, a federal grand jury in United States District Court for the District of Oregon, at Portland, Oregon, indicted Battle, Ford, the two Bilals, al Saoub and Lewis. On October 4, 2002, four of the suspects were arrested, but Ahmed Bilal and al Saoub were both considered fugitives.

Al Saoub was killed by Pakistani forces in Afghanistan while part of an al Qaeda cell. Ford and Battle were both sentenced to eighteen years' imprisonment. Lewis was sentenced to three years in a federal prison camp. Muhammad Bilal got eight years. Hawash was sentenced to seven years.
