= Intel740 =

Graphics processing unit

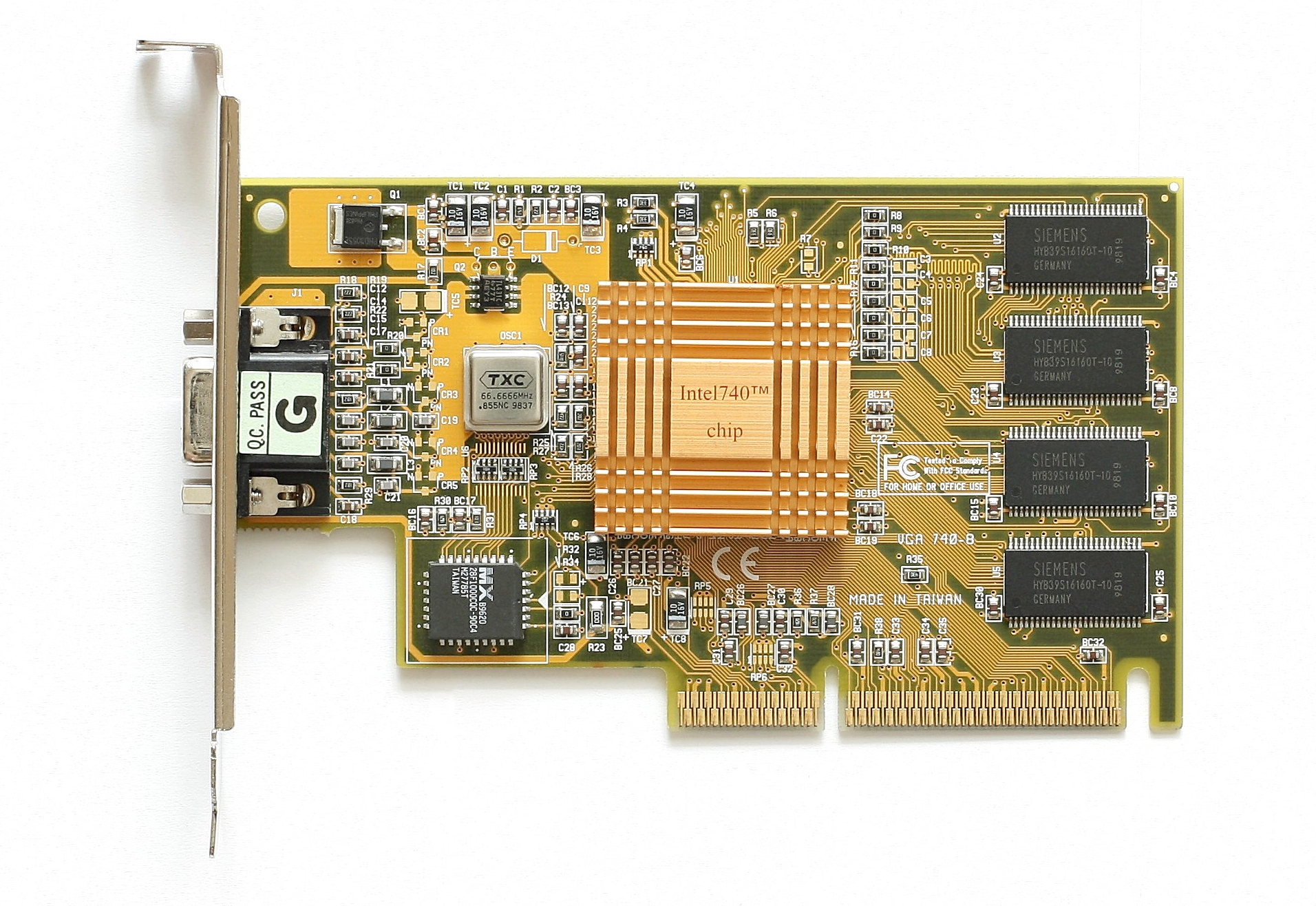
- An Intel740 AGP card
- Codename: Auburn

History
- Predecessor: Intel i750
- Successor: Intel 810, Intel Extreme Graphics (Integrated graphics); Arc Alchemist series (Discrete graphics)

The Intel740, or i740 (codenamed Auburn), is a 350 nm graphics processing unit using the Accelerated Graphics Port (AGP) interface, released by Intel on February 12, 1998. Intel was hoping to use the i740 to popularize AGP while most graphics vendors were still using PCI. Released to enormous fanfare, the i740 proved to have disappointing real-world performance, and sank from view after only a few months on the market. Some of its technology lived on in the form of Intel Extreme Graphics, and the concept of an Intel produced graphics processor lives on in the form of Intel Graphics Technology and Intel Arc.

== History ==
The i740 history starts at GE Aerospace as part of their flight simulation systems, notable for their construction of the Project Apollo "Visual Docking Simulator" used to train Apollo Astronauts to dock the Command Module and Lunar Module. GE sold their aerospace interests to Martin Marietta in 1992, as a part of Jack Welch's aggressive downsizing of GE. In 1995, Martin Marietta merged with Lockheed to form Lockheed Martin.

In January 1995, Lockheed Martin re-organized their divisions and formed Real3D in order to bring their 3D experience to the civilian market. Real3D had an early brush with success, providing chipsets and overall design to Sega, who used it in a number of arcade game boards, the Model 2 and Model 3. They also formed a joint project with Intel and Chips and Technologies (later purchased by Intel) to produce 3D accelerators for the PC market, under the code name "Auburn".

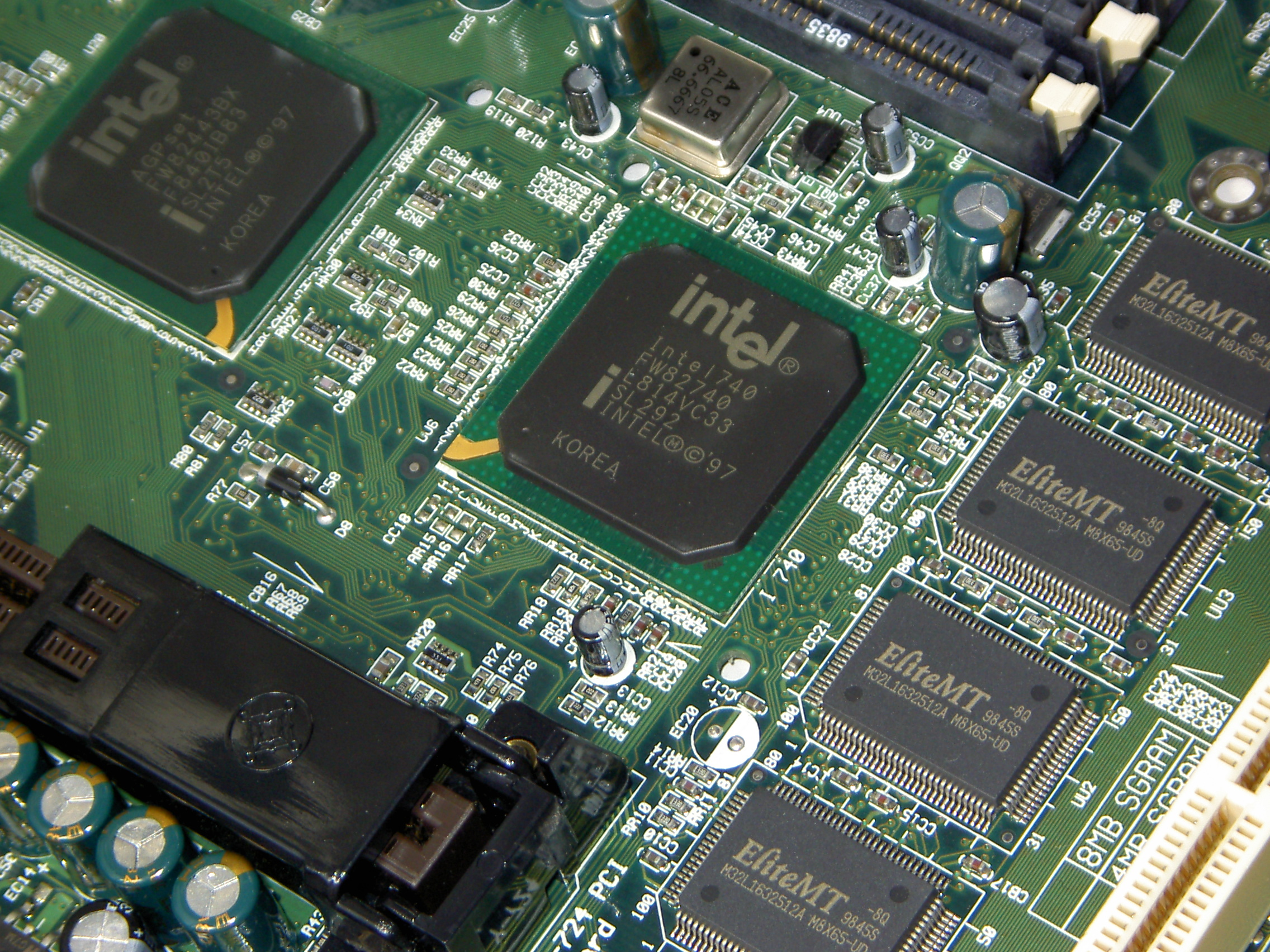
A mainboard with Intel i740

Auburn was designed specifically to take advantage of (and promote) the use of AGP interface, during the time when many competing 3D accelerators (notably, 3dfx Voodoo Graphics) still used the PCI connection. A unique characteristic, which set the AGP version of the card apart from other similar devices on the market, was the use of on-board memory exclusively for the display frame buffer, with all textures being kept in the computer system's main RAM. At the time, most accelerators used the CPU for triangle setup and geometry calculations, then handed the data off to the card to apply texture mapping and bilinear filtering. By leaving this data in main memory, and giving the graphics card a high-speed channel to the data, performance could be improved while also reducing the total amount of memory in the system.

In the lead-up to the i740's introduction, the press widely commented that it would drive all of the smaller vendors from the market. As the introduction approached, rumors of poor performance started circulating. In spite of this, pundits continued to agree that its release would have enormous effects on the market. Peter Glaskowsky noted that "Very few of the manufacturers have the access to the [manufacturing plants] that Intel does, S3 could be the big loser here--it doesn't sell to the performance market. Intel has the resources to beat S3 on those terms and they have the performance". The i740 chip was released in February 1998, at US$34.75 in 10,000 unit quantities. A number of companies had cards to introduce on that day.

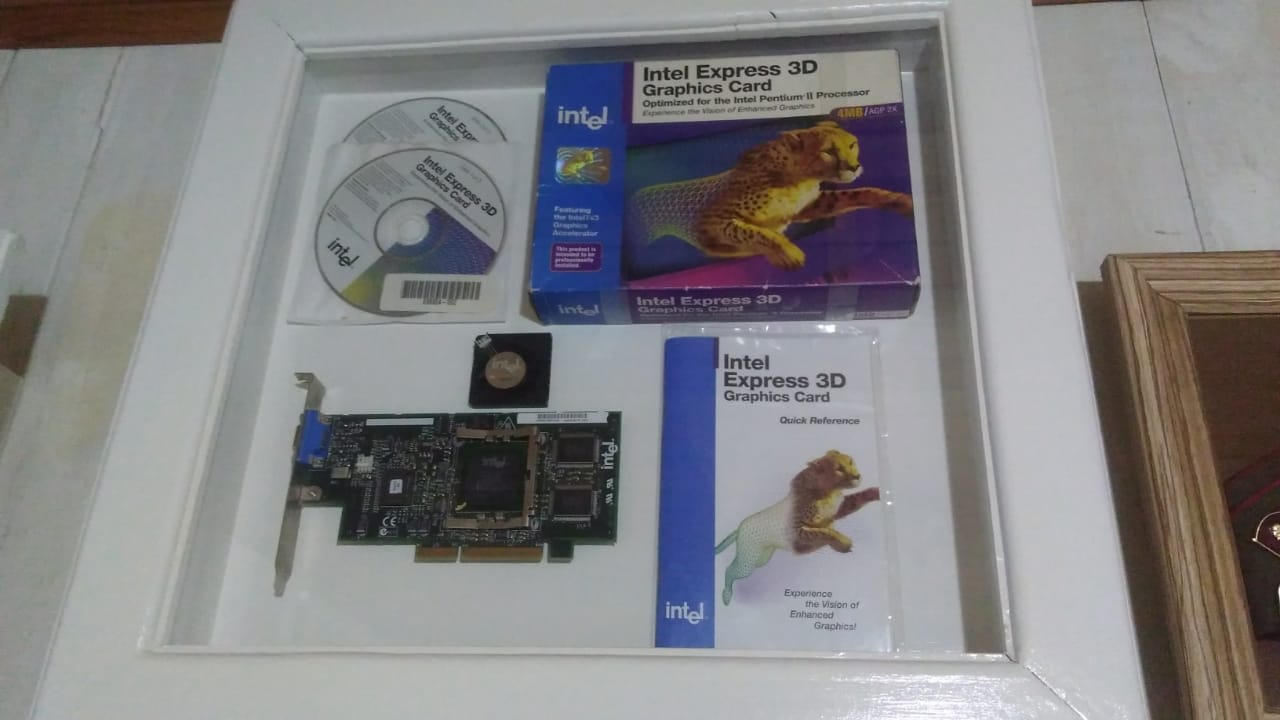
Intel I740 4MB AGP complete in box

The i740 was clocked at 66Mhz and had 2-8MB of VRAM; significantly less than its competitors which had 8-32MB of VRAM, allowing the card to be sold at a low price. The small amount of VRAM meant that it was only used as a frame buffer, hence it used the AGP interface to access the system's main memory to store textures; this was a fatal flaw that took away memory bandwidth and capacity from the CPU, reducing its performance, while also making the card slower since it had to go through the AGP interface to access the main memory which was slower than its VRAM.

The AGP Texture concept soon proved to be a tremendous error in design, because the card had to constantly access the textures over a channel that was upwards of eight times slower than RAM placed on the graphics card itself. Although AGP did indeed improve performance of moving geometry, this was wiped away by the growing use of textures, which were much larger. In real-world use it proved to be much slower than existing solutions like the Voodoo2, and was only able to hold its own with slower 2D/3D cards like the Nvidia RIVA 128. The release of the Nvidia RIVA TNT removed even that advantage. By the end of the year it went largely unmentioned in benchmarks against newer 3D products, already forgotten.

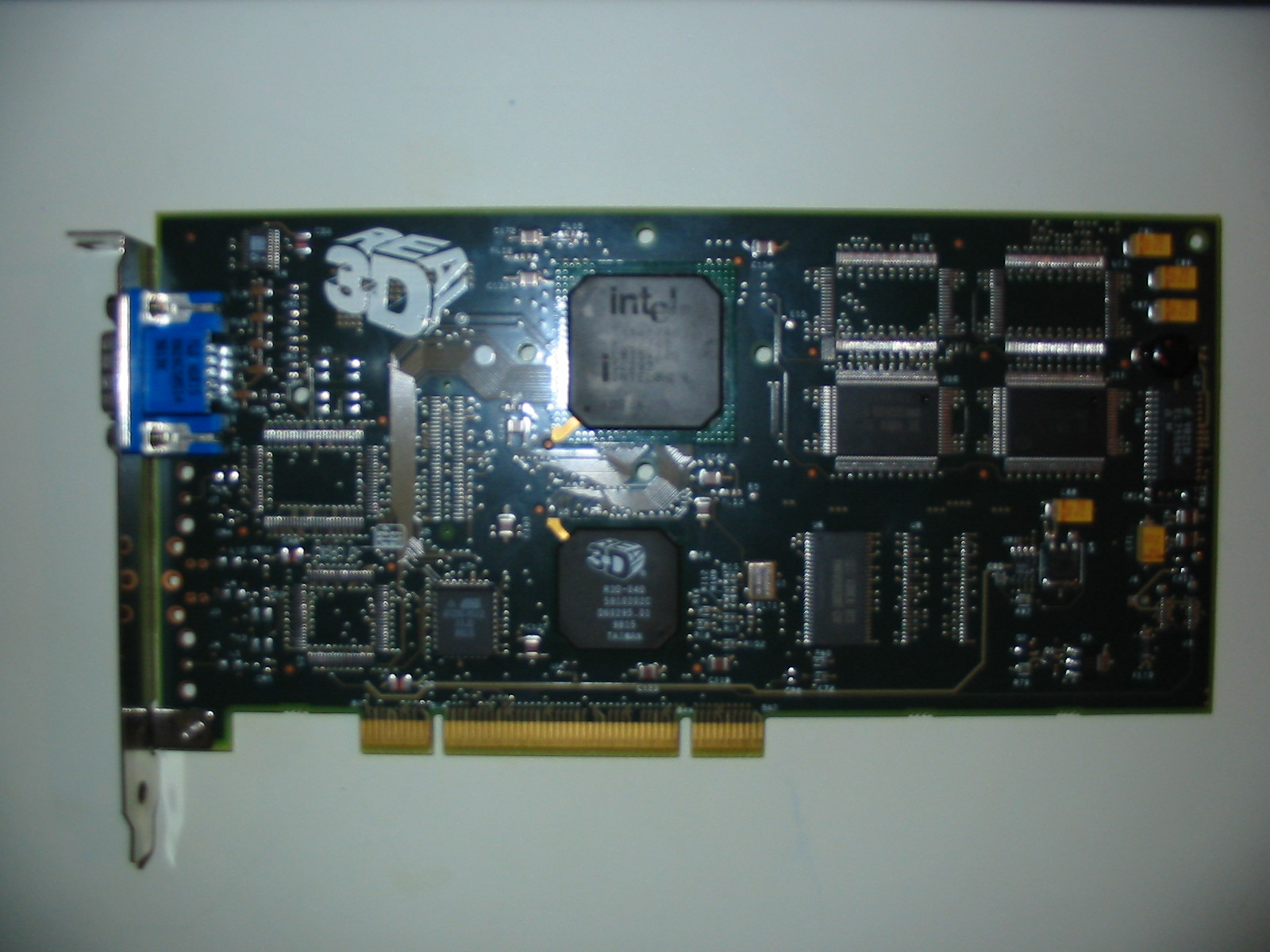
A Intel740 PCI video card from Real3D

Intel also sold the i740 to 3rd party companies, and some PCI versions of the accelerator also were made. They used an AGP-to-PCI bridge chip and had more on-board memory for storing textures locally on the card, and were actually faster than their AGP counterparts in some performance tests.

In August 1999, after less than 18 months on the market, Intel withdrew the i740 from the market. In September Lockheed announced a "customer-focused organizational realignment" that shed many of its divisions, and then closed Real3D on 1 October 1999 (following Calcomp in late 1998). Intel purchased the company's intellectual property, part of a series on ongoing lawsuits, but laid off the remaining skeleton staff. Some staff were picked up as contractors within Intel, while a majority were hired by ATI and moved to a new office.

== Successor ==
In April 1999, Intel announced two successors to the i740: the i752 (code-named Portola) and the i754 (code-named Coloma). Improvements included support for multitexturing, anisotropic filtering, MPEG-2 motion compensation and DVI displays. Both chips would use the same core, the only difference being that the i752 would use a 2× AGP interface and the i754 a 4× AGP interface. However, the i754 was cancelled before release, and the i752 was released in limited quantities before it too was withdrawn, having shown only a marginal performance increase over its predecessor. The i752 and i754 cores were later used for the integrated graphics in the Intel 810 and 815 chipsets, respectively. Intel no longer hosts i752 drivers, and advises users of i752-based cards to use the 810 drivers.

Another successor that was ultimately cancelled in September 2000 was the GPU (code-named Capitola) to be used in conjunction with the similarly ill-fated Timna processor. An unrelated project known as Larrabee was initially developed as a discrete GPU product before being cancelled in 2010 due to delays and unsatisfactory performance; the company would not revisit the idea of a discrete graphics card again until 2018, when the company said that it would produce a discrete GPU by 2020. This would eventually culminate in a line of discrete graphics cards produced by Intel known as Intel Arc in March 2022, 24 years after the release of the i740. The Intel Arc series of graphics cards are based around the Intel Xe GPU architecture.

== See also ==
- Intel i750
- Comparison of Intel graphics processing units
- List of Intel chipsets
