= Muhammad Ibrahim Bilal =

American Islamist

- Status: Released (September 22, 2009)
- Criminal charges: Conspiracy to aid the Taliban in fighting the United States and coalition forces, gun charges
- Penalty: 8 years in prison
- Wanted by: FBI
- Accomplices: Patrice Lumumba Ford; Jeffrey Leon Battle; October Martinique Lewis; Ahmed Ibrahim Bilal; Maher "Mike" Hawash; Habis Abdulla al Saoub (known as the Portland Seven)

Details
- Date apprehended: October 4, 2002
- Imprisoned at: October 2002 to September 22, 2009

Muhammad Ibrahim Bilal was a member of a terrorist group dubbed the Portland Seven, some members of which attempted to travel to Afghanistan shortly after 9/11 in order to aid the Taliban. In October 2002, Bilal was indicted and shortly thereafter arrested in Detroit. In 2003, he was sentenced to eight years on gun charges and for conspiracy to aid the Taliban in fighting the United States and coalition forces.

== Muhammad Bilal and the Portland Seven ==
Patrice Lumumba Ford, Jeffrey Leon Battle, October Martinique Lewis (Battle's ex-wife), Muhammad Ibrahim Bilal, his brother Ahmed Ibrahim Bilal, Maher "Mike" Hawash, and Habis Abdulla al Saoub made up the original seven members wanted by the FBI.

According to the FBI, in plea agreements Muhammad and Ahemed Bilal admitted to engaging in martial arts and firearms in order to prepare themselves for jihad in Afghanistan or elsewhere:

Both defendants [Muhammad and Ahmed Bilal] admit that on Oct. 20, 2001, while U.S. military forces were fighting al Qaeda and the Taliban in Afghanistan, co-defendant Maher Hawash took them and co-defendant Ford to the airport in Portland, where they flew to Hong Kong to meet with others. In the plea agreement, both defendants state that they entered into mainland China, went to Kashgar in Western China, and tried, unsuccessfully, to gain entrance into Pakistan.

On September 29, 2001, Battle, Ford and al Saoub were discovered while engaged in shooting practice in a gravel pit in Skamania County, Washington. Also present was Ali Khalid Steitiye, who did not become an indicted member of the Portland Seven on terrorism charges, but who was separately charged with other crimes.

According to the indictment, on October 17, 2001, Battle and al Saoub flew out of Portland International Airport en route to Afghanistan. On October 20, 2001, Ford and the two Bilals also took the same route out of the United States.

M. Bilal returned to the U.S. on or about December 24, 2001.

The six male members of the group travelled to China in early 2002, with the intent of entering Afghanistan to aid the Taliban. Lacking visas and other documentation, they were turned back, and all but al Saoub then returned again to the United States.

On Thursday, October 3, 2002, a federal grand jury in United States District Court for the District of Oregon, at Portland, Oregon, indicted Battle, Ford, the two Bilals, al Saoub and Lewis. On October 4, 2002, the FBI in Portland, Oregon announced the arrest of four of those original six on charges of aiding and, in some cases, trying to join Al-Qaida fighters. Battle, Ford and Lewis were all arrested that morning in Portland. Muhammad Bilal was arrested at the same time by the FBI in Dearborn, Michigan.

== Sentencing ==
Ford and Battle are each serving eighteen-year sentences. Lewis was sentenced to three years in a federal prison camp. Ahmed Bilal got ten years. Hawash was sentenced to seven years. Muhammad was sentenced to eight years and was released from prison on September 22, 2009.

Muhammad Bilal's lawyer, Andrew Bates, described Bilal as an ""ordinary young man" and a "gentle soul" whose mission to Afghanistan was a "misadventure.""
