= Material witness =

Legal term

In American criminal law, a material witness is a person with information alleged to be material concerning a criminal proceeding. The authority to detain material witnesses dates to the First Judiciary Act of 1789, but the Bail Reform Act of 1984 most recently amended the text of the statute, and it is now codified at 18 U.S.C. § 3144. The most recent version allows material witnesses to be held to ensure the giving of their testimony in criminal proceedings or to a grand jury.

Since September 11, 2001, the U.S. has used the material witness statute to detain suspects without charge for indefinite periods of time, often under the rubric of securing grand-jury testimony. This use of the statute is controversial and is currently under judicial review. In Ashcroft v. al-Kidd (2011), the detainee was never charged or called as a witness, and sued John Ashcroft, then the U.S. attorney general. The Supreme Court overturned a ruling by the Ninth Circuit Court of Appeals and held that Ashcroft had qualified immunity.

== Text of the statute ==
18 U.S.C. § 3144, commonly referred to as the "material witness statute," provides as follows:

If it appears from an affidavit filed by a party that the testimony of a person is material in a criminal proceeding, and if it is shown that it may become impracticable to secure the presence of the person by subpoena, a judicial officer may order the arrest of the person and treat the person in accordance with the provisions of section 3142 of this title. No material witness may be detained because of inability to comply with any condition of release if the testimony of such witness can adequately be secured by deposition, and if further detention is not necessary to prevent a failure of justice. Release of a material witness may be delayed for a reasonable period of time until the deposition of the witness can be taken pursuant to the Federal Rules of Criminal Procedure.

== Introduction ==
A material witness is an individual who contains information "material" to a criminal proceeding. With the authority of 18 U.S.C. § 3144, the United States government can seek a warrant from a judicial officer in order to arrest a material witness. To do so, a United States official must file an affidavit with the judicial officer alleging that (1) the individual has material information to the criminal proceeding and (2) it would be "impracticable to secure the presence of the person by subpoena."

Although there has been much legal debate about the scope of the material witness statute, it has been clear since the Ninth Circuit Court of Appeals ruling in Bacon v. United States, 449 F.2d 933 (9th Cir. 1971), that the phrase "a criminal proceeding" from the material witness statute includes both trials (uncontroversially) and grand jury investigations. Thus, the ability to arrest material witnesses under the statute extends to the ability to arrest those with information material to a grand jury investigation (assuming the showing of impracticability is also made). The Supreme Court has not had a chance to rule on this statutory issue.

== Detentions of material witnesses after September 11 ==
After the attacks of September 11, 2001, the United States government announced a campaign of aggressive detention, by whatever means possible, of those potentially involved in attacks on the United States. The means included using the material witness statute to detain even suspects (as opposed to witnesses). Many of those detained as material witnesses were detained as witnesses to grand jury proceedings, which only investigate and are not criminal trials.

This caused controversy for several reasons. Primarily, critics believed that the government's use of the material witness statute to detain suspects was an evasion of the Fourth Amendment to the US Constitution, which provides some protections to criminal suspects that were apparently ignored in the arrests of the material witness detainees post-September 11. Secondarily, legal critics took issue with the application of the material witness statute to grand jury proceedings.

Statistics on federal material witness warrant hearings showed a steady decline from 2000 to 2002, from 3603 material witness hearings in FY2000, to 3344 in FY2001 and 2961 in FY2002. During and after that period, the overwhelming majority of material witness warrant hearings took place in judicial districts bordering Mexico and involved illegal alien traffic.

=== Attempting to amend the material witness statute ===
In 2005, with the intent of alleviating concerns over such use of the material witness statute, Democratic Party Senator Patrick Leahy proposed A Bill to Amend the Material Witness Statute to Strengthen Procedural Safeguards, and for Other Purposes, S. 1739 § 1. The legislation failed to move forwards, however, after being sent to the Senate Judiciary Committee. A 2006 ruling found that material witness law could only be used when an individual is genuinely sought as a witness and there was a flight risk; it is not to be used as a preventive action.

=== Ashcroft v. al-Kidd ===
In 2009 the Ninth Circuit of Appeals in San Francisco, California found in Ashcroft v. al-Kidd that former Attorney General John Ashcroft could be sued personally for wrongful detention by Abdullah al-Kidd, an American citizen who was arrested in 2003 and held for 16 days in maximum security prisons to be used as a material witness in the trial of Sami Omar Al-Hussayen. Al-Kidd was never charged or called as a witness. (Al-Hussayen was acquitted in 2004 of all charges of supporting terrorism.)

The circuit court's decision was unanimously reversed in Ashcroft v. al-Kidd (2011) by the United States Supreme Court on May 31, 2011, affirming the immunity of government officials operating in their official positions.

== See also ==
- Brandon Mayfield
- Mike Hawash
- Detention of Ayub Ali Khan and Mohammed Jaweed Azmath
