= Digital Video Interactive =

Suite of digital video and audio formats

Digital Video Interactive (DVI) was the first multimedia desktop video standard for IBM-compatible personal computers. It enabled full-screen, full motion video, as well as stereo audio, still images, and graphics to be presented on a DOS-based desktop computer using a special compression chipset. The scope of Digital Video Interactive encompasses a file format, including a digital container format, a number of video and audio compression formats, as well as hardware associated with the file format.

== History ==
Development of DVI was started around 1984 by Section 17 of The David Sarnoff Research Center Labs (DSRC) then responsible for the research and development activities of RCA. When General Electric purchased RCA in 1986, GE considered the DSRC redundant with its own labs, and sought a buyer. In 1988, GE sold the DSRC to SRI International, but sold the DVI technology separately to Intel corporation.

DVI technology allowed full-screen, full motion digital video, as well as stereo audio, still images, and graphics to be presented on a DOS-based desktop computer. DVI content was created using the Authology Multimedia authoring system developed by CEIT Systems and usually distributed on CD-ROM discs, which in turn was decoded and displayed via specialized add-in card hardware installed in the computer. Audio and video files for DVI were among the first to use data compression, with audio content using ADPCM. DVI was the first technology of its kind for the desktop PC, and ushered in the multimedia revolution for PCs.

DVI was announced at the second annual Microsoft CD-ROM conference in Seattle to a standing ovation in 1987. The excitement at the time stemmed from the fact that a CD-ROM drive of the era had a maximum data playback rate of ~1.2 Mbit/s, thought to be insufficient for good quality motion video. However, the DSRC team was able to extract motion video, stereo audio and still images from this relatively low data rate with good quality.

== Implementations ==
The first implementation of DVI developed in the mid-80s relied on three 16-bit ISA cards installed inside the computer, one for audio processing, another for video processing, and the last as an interface to a Sony CDU-100 CD-ROM drive. The DVI video card used a custom chipset (later known as the i80750 or i750 chipset) for decompression, one device was known as the pixel processor & the display device was called the VDP (video display processor).

Later DVI implementations used one, more highly integrated card, such as Intel's ActionMedia series (omitting the CD-ROM interface). The ActionMedia (and the later ActionMedia II) were available in both ISA and MCA-bus cards, the latter for use in MCA-bus PCs like IBM's PS/2 series.

Intel utilized the i750 technology in driving creation of the MMX instruction set.

== Compression ==
The DVI format specified two video compression schemes – Presentation Level Video, or Production Level Video (PLV), and Real-Time Video – and two audio compression schemes – ADPCM and PCM8.

The original video compression scheme, called Presentation Level Video, was asymmetric in that a Digital VAX-11/750 minicomputer was used to compress the video in non-real time to 30 frames per second with a resolution of 320 × 240. Encoding was performed by Intel at its facilities or at licensed encoding facilities set up by Intel. Video compression involved coding both still frames and motion-compensated residuals using vector quantization in dimensions 1, 2, and 4. The resulting file (in the .AVS format) was displayed in real-time on an IBM PC-AT (i286) with the add-in boards providing decompression and display functions at NTSC (30 frame per second) resolutions. The IBM PC-AT equipped with the DVI add-in boards hence had 2 monitors – the original monochrome control monitor and a second Sony CDP1302 monitor for the color video. Stereo audio at near FM broadcasting quality was also available from the system.

The Real-Time Video format was introduced in March 1988, then called Edit-Level Video (ELV). In fall 1992, version 2.1 of the Real-Time Video format was introduced by Intel as Indeo 2.

== Legacy of DSRC ==
The original team from DSRC (David Sarnoff Research Center) set up an Intel operation NJ1 as the Princeton Operation. The team occupied new quarters after moving out of the DSRC in Plainsboro, New Jersey. From the original 35 researchers the Princeton Operation grew to over 200 people at its height. Andy Grove was a great supporter of the Princeton Team during its term of operation. However in 1992 Ken Fine (a vice president of Intel) decided to shutter the operation and transfer those employees willing to move to other Intel sites in Arizona and Oregon. Fine left the company shortly after he implemented this decision. Final site closure occurred almost a year later in September 1993.
