= Intel Architecture Labs =

System research-and-development arm of Intel

Intel Architecture Labs (IAL) was the personal-computer system research-and-development arm of Intel during the 1990s.

== History and formation ==
IAL was created by Intel Vice-president Ron Whittier together with Craig Kinnie and Steven McGeady to develop the hardware and software innovations considered to be lacking from PC original equipment manufacturers (OEMs) and Microsoft in the late 1980s and 1990s. IAL pursued both hardware and software initiatives, both of which were important factors in the evolution of, and the control of, the PC industry.

== Rivalry with Microsoft ==
Around the same time in the PC industry, Microsoft was emerging as the de facto industry standard in PC Operating Systems and software application for the PC. As IAL's software ambitions began to overlap with Microsoft's, a rivalry broke out between Intel and Microsoft as it related to the amount of influence, control, and the setting of standards in the rapidly growing PC industry. Over time, IAL's work in software projects was gradually de-emphasized after the software efforts collided with similar activities by Microsoft.

=== Native Signal Processing (NSP) ===
Native Signal Processing (NSP) was an example of a significant software effort in IAL. NSP was a software initiative to allow Intel-based PCs to run time-sensitive code independently of the operating system (OS), allowing real-time audio and video processing on the microprocessors of the mid-1990s. Intel, whose microprocessors powered PC hardware designs, invested heavily in improving the performance of its chips. As a result of the increase in performance, Intel saw an opportunity to transfer software workloads from specialized microprocessors over to the central Intel microprocessors. This strategy was fundamental to Intel's vision of a powerful central microprocessor made with its advanced chip building capabilities. NSP was, in that regard, a gold mine of power-hungry software workloads which were previously running on Digital Signal Processor chips. This led to IAL's decision to embark on NSP, a large software initiative to gradually move the algorithms and software implementations from DSPs to the central Intel microprocessor.

IAL's decision to pursue NSP clashed with Microsoft. NSP's software architecture was designed to be agnostic of the software operating system. This was a common strategic direction with PC chip manufacturers in the 1980s and 1990s because it allowed chips to be used in a multitude of software operating environments, and not just the Microsoft operating systems such as Microsoft Windows. IAL kept the NSP secret from Microsoft, contrary to the two company's prior commitment to disclose projects to one another. IAL told Microsoft about NSP in early 1995 when it began to talk to OEMs about pre-installing NSP. Microsoft got a copy of NSP and tested it against Windows 95, which was in late beta test. Microsoft discovered that NSP was incompatible with Windows 95 and caused machines to crash. When Microsoft informed Intel about this, Intel admitted it never tested against Windows 95; Intel felt it was unnecessary because it felt Windows 95 would be a failure. When Microsoft proposed working together to make NSP compatible with Windows 95, IAL declined and would not cooperate with Microsoft to make NSP compatible with the forthcoming Windows 95. As a result, Microsoft went to the OEMs to warn them of the incompatibilities, which caused the OEMs to back away from NSP. With no OEM support, NSP was left as an orphan and not pursued further by IAL.

=== Web browser ===
IAL also tangled with Microsoft by supporting Netscape and their early web browser Netscape Navigator, and by producing a fast native x86 port of the Java system. Most of these projects were later shelved, and after 1997, IAL tended not to risk competing with Microsoft. The details of IAL's conflicts with Microsoft over software were revealed in Steven McGeady's testimony in the Microsoft antitrust trial.

Not all of IAL's software efforts met bad ends due to Microsoft—IAL developed one of the first software digital video systems, Indeo - technology that was used in its ProShare videoconferencing product line but suffered later from neglect and was sold to another company in the late 1990s.

== Input/output interconnect projects ==
However, IAL successes in the hardware world are legendary, and include PCI, USB, AGP, the Northbridge/Southbridge core logic architecture and PCI Express.

=== Universal Serial Bus (USB) ===
USB, in particular, was developed in the Oregon offices of IAL, where the architects of PCI and the Plug and Play initiatives assisted in building the first peripheral interconnect that would work with devices without requiring the PC to be dismantled. This vision of a sealed PC that could be extended with external devices was central to Intel's strategy of making the PC more like a consumer device. USB emerged as the lead contender for the interconnect standard interface, and an Intel team of engineers set out to create an industry standard.

Intel's engineering standards were well known as being among the highest in the industry, driven by the company's adherence to careful development of technical specifications before setting out to design or develop a new product. As part of the engineering process, Intel engineers wrote detailed technical specifications during the early phases of design, to ensure the features were well understood and agreed upon. Since Intel's products usually involved complex chip designs, errors or omissions in the design or features could prove costly if done without the appropriate rigor and review that came along with the detailed engineering reviews that accompanied the design process.

In the early 1990s the initial USB specification was spearheaded in IAL, driven by a small team of software and hardware architects & engineers. The engineers were scattered across Intel campuses in Oregon and California. In Oregon, the chief engineers of the USB project in IAL included Brad Hosler, Shelagh Callahan, John Howard, John Garney, and Kosar Jaff, all based in the Hillsboro Oregon Intel site.

While the IAL-based USB team was primarily located in Intel's campus in Hillsboro Oregon, the USB project also included a team of chip designers in the Intel Chipset Group (Peripheral Components Division) located on the Intel campus in Folsom, California. The partnership between the IAL engineers and the chipset engineers was crucial in the development of the original USB specification. Throughout the development of the USB 1.0 specifications, the IAL engineers worked closely with chipset designers (inside and outside Intel). Together, the engineering teams in Oregon and California were tasked with building the world's first USB based computer by designing and manufacturing the USB Host Controller.

==== USB host controller design ====
A critical component of the USB design was the interface between hardware and software, which was the domain of the USB Host Controller, the brains behind the interconnect that all USB devices communicate with. The USB Host Controller was embedded in the South Bridge chip, and was designed to match the USB specification being developed by the IAL engineers. USB was, like PCI, a unique combination of hardware and software definitions, and as a result the project needed a software engineering team from the outset, unlike typical Intel hardware projects. The USB software device driver "stack" was initially developed on Windows 95 using the Virtual Device Driver (VxD) model of Windows 95. The VxD-based USB driver stack was helpful to Microsoft as they implemented a brand new USB stack using the emerging Windows Driver Model (WDM) largely because of Microsoft's strategic shift towards Windows NT, and away from Windows 95. WDM was uniquely compatible with both operating systems, and the decision to abandon the VxD stack was a win-win for Intel and Microsoft. The collaboration between IAL and Microsoft improved during the development of USB 1.0, largely driven by the software developers that Intel hired into its IAL labs. Software developers at Microsoft were able to speak a familiar technical language with their fellow software developers from IAL, allowing the group to work as a single unit to drive the USB standard into the Windows-based PCs of the 1990s and beyond.

==== Collaboration with industry partners ====
Unlike previous IAL projects which had resulted in considerable conflict and tension with other companies in the PC industry, the USB project stood out as a highlight of the cooperation between IAL's engineers and the rest of the PC industry. The IAL USB team worked closely with Microsoft, sharing their lessons learned, and helping the Microsoft team add support for the USB interconnect in Windows, as well as in Microsoft peripheral devices, such as Microsoft keyboards. The IAL team dedicated a full time engineer to work with Microsoft closely so as to avoid delays and repeating mistakes the Intel team had made during the development of the specification and first hardware and software implementations. The USB team in IAL, while small and focused, developed a reputation for being collaborative, supportive, and focused on educating the industry about the emerging USB standard. The engineers were regular presenters at USB Developer's Conferences and collaborated with dozens of hardware and software companies who were eager to implement the industry's first broadly-adopted interconnect standard to make PCs more user friendly.

== Disbanding ==
In 2001, after the departure of all of its creators, IAL was disbanded and replaced with the very different Intel Labs under Pat Gelsinger, though most of the creative talent that had been in IAL was by then scattered across the company or had left entirely. In a 2005 re-organization, Intel Labs itself was reorganized with the intent of rebuilding a research function.

Compare Intel's Architecture Development Lab.

== See also ==
- Dan Fost (August 28, 1998). "Intel's Dream Factory: Firm's labs look for new uses for computer chips". San Francisco Chronicle.
- Millison, Doug. The 800-Pound Gorilla, Computer Currents 11(24):80-82
- John Spooner (July 24, 2000). "Inside Intel: Betting on the future". ZDNet News. Archived from the original on December 18, 2007.
