= October Lewis =

October Martinique Lewis was a member of a terrorist group dubbed the Portland Seven, some members of which attempted to travel to Afghanistan shortly after 9/11 in order to aid the Taliban. Lewis was sentenced to three years in federal prison after cooperating with the government and pleading guilty to six counts of money laundering. Lewis admitted to transferring money abroad to Jeffrey Leon Battle, her ex-husband, in order to assist him in his efforts to aid the Taliban.

Lewis and Battle were married in 1999, divorcing after five months, although they continued to live together. According to Lewis' mother, Lewis and Battle had worked in a Portland retirement home. Patrice Lumumba Ford, Jeffrey Battle, October Martinique Lewis, Muhammad Ibrahim Bilal, his brother Ahmed Ibrahim Bilal, Maher "Mike" Hawash, and Habis Abdulla al Saoub made up the original seven members wanted by the FBI. The members of the Portland Seven "were all named in the 15-count superseding indictment that included charges of conspiracy to levy war against the United States, conspiracy to provide material support and resources to al Qaeda, conspiracy to contribute services to al Qaeda and the Taliban, conspiracy to possess and discharge firearms in furtherance of crimes of violence, possessing firearms in furtherance of crimes of violence and money laundering."

On September 29, 2001, Battle, Ford and al Saoub were discovered while engaged in shooting practice in a gravel pit in Skamania County, Washington. Also present was Ali Khalid Steitiye, who did not become an indicted member of the Portland Seven on terrorism charges, but who was separately charged with other crimes. According to the indictment, between October 2001 and January 2002, Lewis wired a series of money orders to Battle in China and Bangladesh. The six male members of the group travelled to China in early 2002, with the intent of entering Afghanistan to aid the Taliban. Lacking visas and other documentation, they were turned back, and all but al Saoub then returned again to the United States.

On October 3, 2002, a federal grand jury in United States District Court for the District of Oregon, at Portland, Oregon, indicted Battle, Ford, the two Bilals, al Saoub and Lewis. On October 4, 2002, the FBI in Portland, Oregon, announced the arrest of four of those original six on charges of aiding and, in some cases, trying to join Al-Qaida fighters. Battle, Ford and Lewis were all arrested that morning in Portland.

Al Saoub was killed by Pakistani forces in October 2003. Ford and Battle are each serving eighteen-year sentences. Ahmed Bilal got ten years, while Muhammad Bilal got eight. Hawash was sentenced to seven years. Lewis was released on January 20, 2006.
