= Patrice Lumumba Ford =

American terrorist

Patrice Lumumba Ford has been accused of membership in a terrorist group dubbed the Portland Seven, members of which attempted to travel to Afghanistan shortly after 9/11 in order to aid the Taliban. He refused to cooperate with the government and was sentenced to eighteen years in prison (avoiding a possible life sentence) after pleading guilty to seditious conspiracy and levying war against American and allied forces.

== Background ==
Patrice Lumumba Ford is Ford's birth name – he is named after Patrice Lumumba. Ford's father, Kent Ford, founded the Portland chapter of the Black Panther Party in the 1960s. A family friend and political activist, Kathleen Sadat, commented that "Lumumba was raised by people who taught that we exist in a multicultural world and the trick is learning how to get along with other people, not to destroy them."

Ford dropped out of Morehouse College in Atlanta, Georgia shortly after enrolling in 1989 and later enrolled at Portland State University in Portland, Oregon, majoring in Chinese and International Studies. He studied for three semesters in China, where he eventually converted to Islam. Reflecting on Ford's attitude after his return to Portland, one of his instructors, professor Gerald Sussman said "Ford was head and shoulders above everybody in the class... He was a very nice guy, smart and tremendously responsible." Ford indicated at one point that "he wanted to marry a 'real' Muslim – not a 'fake' American one – who carries an AK-47 assault rifle and is 'ready to run and blow something up.'"

In 1998 and 1999, Ford worked at Portland City Hall in Oregon and was widely described as a "model intern." In 2001, Ford "was so upset by this country's Middle Eastern policy that he sent an email to Mayor Vera Katz's office that was troubling enough in its anti-Semitism to be forwarded to the Portland police."

== Terrorism ==
Ford, Jeffrey Leon Battle, October Martinique Lewis (Battle's ex-wife), Muhammad Ibrahim Bilal, his brother Ahmed Ibrahim Bilal, Maher "Mike" Hawash, and Habis Abdulla al Saoub made up the original seven people (Portland Seven) wanted by the FBI.

According to the United States Department of Justice, "Ford also admitted that after the September 11th attacks, he purchased a shotgun and then conducted weapons training on two occasions at a gravel pit in Washougal, Washington, with other co-defendants."

On September 29, 2001, Battle, Ford and al Saoub were discovered while engaged in shooting practice in a gravel pit in Skamania County, Washington. Also present was Ali Khalid Steitiye, who did not become an indicted member of the Portland Seven on terrorism charges, but who was separately charged with other crimes. The group was discovered by Deputy Sheriff Mark Mercer who was acting on a tip from a neighbor who had heard gunfire in the pit. Deputy Mercer let the men go after taking their names and reported the incident to the FBI. Battle, Ford, and al Saoub went on to become the core of the "Portland Seven".

According to the indictment, on October 17, 2001, Battle and al Saoub flew out of Portland International Airport en route to Afghanistan. On October 20, 2001, Ford and the two Bilals also took the same route out of the United States. In November 2001 and January 2002, Ford wired money to al Saoub in China. Ford returned to the U.S. on or about November 19, 2001. The six male members of the group traveled to China in early 2002, with the intent of entering Afghanistan to aid the Taliban. Lacking visas and other documentation, they were turned back, and all but al Saoub then returned again to the United States.

On Thursday, October 3, 2002, a federal grand jury in United States District Court for the District of Oregon, at Portland, Oregon, indicted Battle, Ford, the two Bilals, al Saoub and Lewis. On October 4, 2002, the FBI in Portland, Oregon announced the arrest of four of those original six on charges of aiding and, in some cases, trying to join Al-Qaida fighters. Battle, Ford and Lewis were all arrested that morning in Portland.

== Trial ==
Ford's brother Sekou Ford wrote a letter to the editor on behalf of his brother. Sekou Ford claimed that his brother Patrice, and his associates, were merely scapegoats for an "overfunded, undereffective Joint Terrorism Task Force".

The Justice Department tried to bar Stanley Cohen from representing Ford. The Justice Department alleged that they had evidence that Cohen had provided financial support to jihadists. They claimed they could not release this evidence without compromising the United States national security.

=== Plea agreement ===
Cohen said of the plea deal he made on Ford's behalf that it was "one of the worst pleas I've ever taken," adding "It was part of a desperate need by the government to find bogeymen to justify their failures in Afghanistan and Iraq... It's a terrible case that served its purpose for the Bush administration." This analysis was rejected by the U.S. attorney who prosecuted the case, Charles Gorder, who said: "These guys are terrorists and traitors, not political pawns."

== Sentencing ==
According to Ford, "The attack on Afghanistan killed and maimed thousands of people without achieving its objective... I refuse to stand passive in the face of such policies.

At Ford's sentencing, "Judge Robert E. Jones said he was convinced Ford would have done anything he could to make sure he killed an American in Afghanistan. "You do not represent the Muslim faith," said Jones. "You are an insult to the Muslim faith. You're no Nelson Mandela or anyone close to it." Ford and his lawyers now maintain that he intended to travel to Afghanistan to volunteer in refugee camps.

Al Saoub was killed by Pakistani forces in Afghanistan while part of an al Qaeda cell. Battle is also serving an eighteen-year sentence. Lewis was sentenced to three years in a federal prison camp. Muhammad Bilal got eight years while Ahmed Bilal got ten. Hawash was sentenced to seven years.

== Release ==
According to the Federal Bureau of Prisons website, Ford was released in 2018.
