= Kent Ford (activist) =

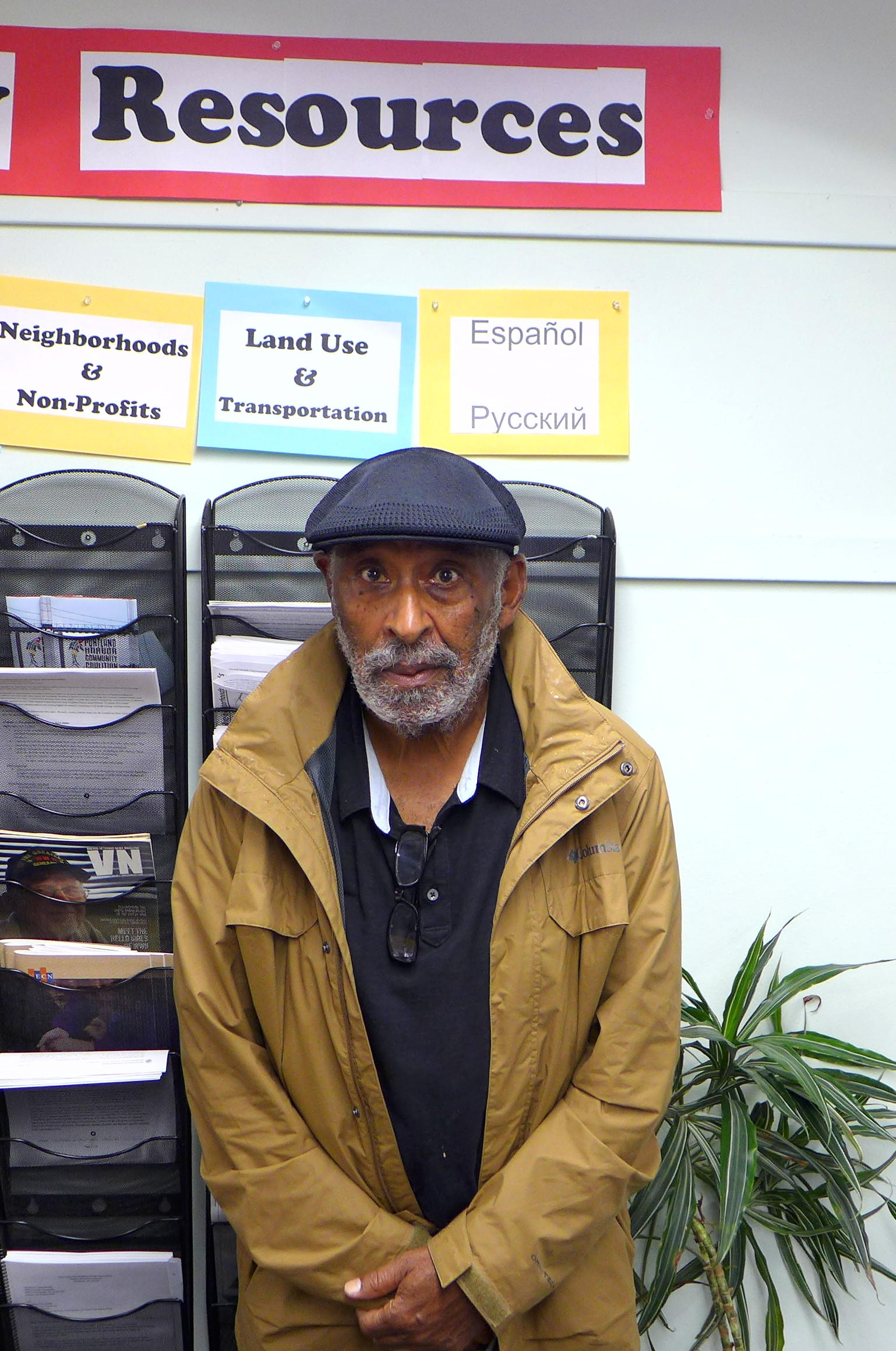
- Born: 1943 (age 82–83); Maringouin, Louisiana

Kent Ford (born 1943) is a co-founder of the Portland chapter of the Black Panther Party in the U.S. state of Oregon in 1969.

== Early life ==
Kent Ford was born in 1943 near Maringouin, Louisiana. At the age of 12 he moved to Redmond, California with his three siblings, mother, and her husband. At the age of 18 he had his first brush with police in California when he was arrested and jailed for three days for going 60 mph in a 45 mph zone. Shortly after he moved to Portland, Oregon in 1961. Here he set up a candy business buying supplies wholesale and having adolescents sell door-to-door.

In 1967 he took a job at Safeway as a computer operator for 104 stores. The same year he returned home to find he'd been robbed, and he subsequently called the police because $1,000 was missing. When the police filed their report, it wasn't about the robbery, but instead about "possible subversive subject" - which referred to Kent Ford, who at the time had large maps of Vietnam and Cambodia in his home and writings by Mao Zedong. Several weeks later Ford intervened while police were arresting a man, and was subsequently arrested, assaulted, and held in jail on $80,000 bail on charges that he had incited a riot. He was eventually acquitted and awarded a $6,000 settlement.

== Founding of the Portland chapter of the Black Panther Party ==
In 1968, after the shooting of Martin Luther King Jr., a group of 20 Black young adults in Portland started regularly meeting to discuss the writings of Malcolm X and other activist writers; not more than a year later, in June 1969, Kent Ford was beaten and jailed for these activities. After Ford's release from jail he organized a press conference on the steps of Portland Central Precinct, then at SW Second & Oak, and proclaimed, "If they keep coming in with these fascist tactics we're going to defend ourselves." Shortly thereafter Huey Newton invited him to form and lead a Portland chapter of the Black Panther party. Approximately six members of the reading group formed Portland's chapter. In total, the initial Portland Panthers had approximately 50 members, half of whom were women. One of the requirements of the Black Panther party in Portland was that members read at least two hours a day.

The Portland Black Panther Party was active in demonstrations against the Vietnam War. They created a children's breakfast program and fed hundreds of children daily in the dining room at Highland United Church of Christ in Northeast Portland. The chapter also opened and operated two medical clinics in Portland, The Malcolm X Dental Clinic and Fred Hampton Memorial People's Health Clinic.

== Later life ==
Ford has three sons, James, Sekou, and Patrice Lumumba.

As of 2020, Ford was active giving historic Black Panther walking tours about six times a year.

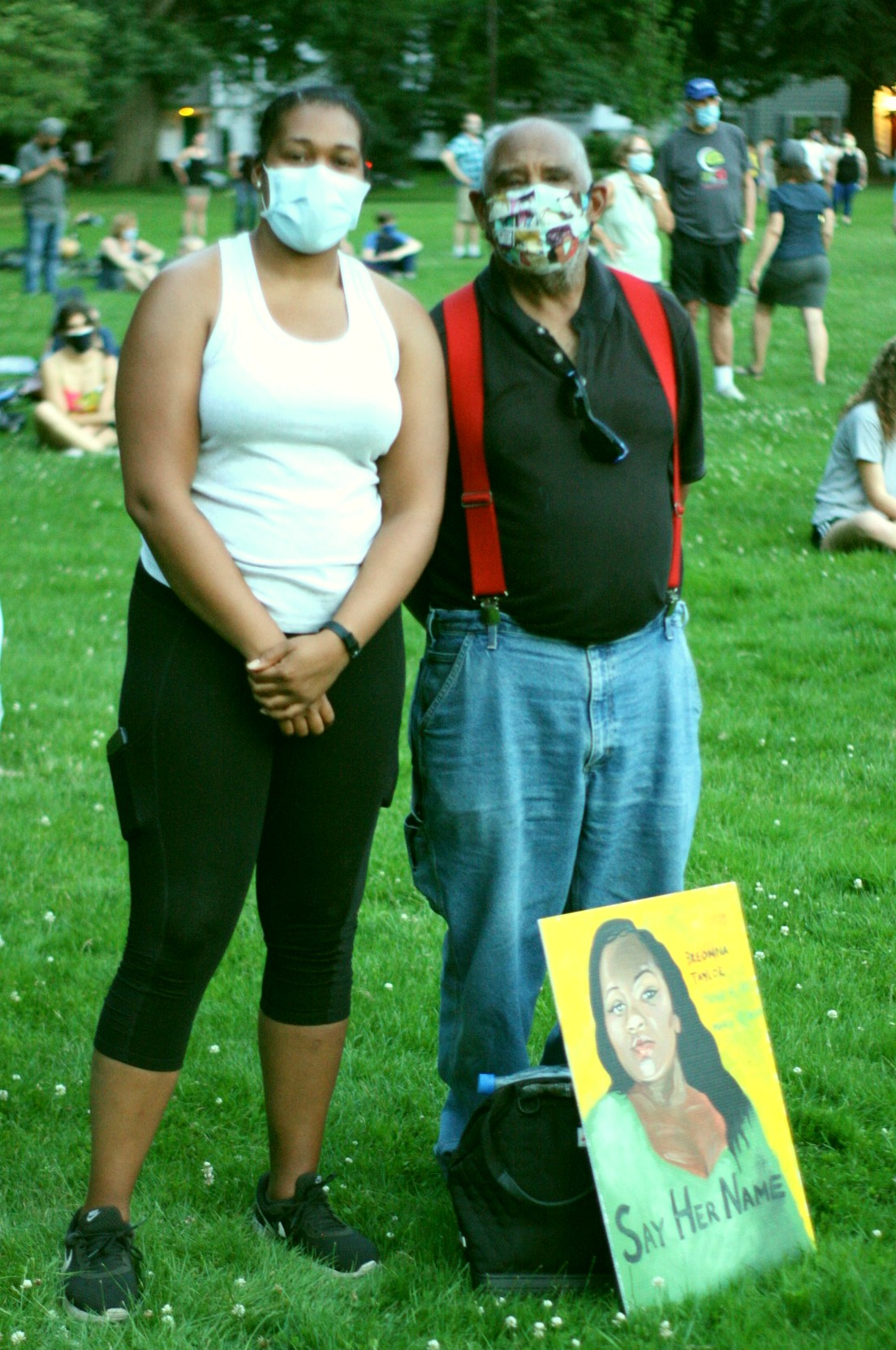
Kent Ford at a demonstration at Reed College in June 2020.

In 2020, Ford participated in protests against police brutality in Portland, Oregon.

In 2021, a $20,000 Community Placemaking grant was awarded by the Portland Metro Council to support a play about Ford's life and work titled, "Walking through Portland with a Panther - the life of Mr. Kent Ford, All Power". A stage reading of the play was conducted in February 2022, during a three day tribute in Portland honoring Kent Ford. The Vanport Mosaic and Confrontation Theatre presented the solo play in June 2022.
