= Real3D =

- Industry: Graphics boards, video games
- Founded: 1995; 31 years ago
- Defunct: 1999
- Headquarters: United States
- Owner: Lockheed Martin
- Website: real3d.com at the Wayback Machine (archived 1997-01-02)

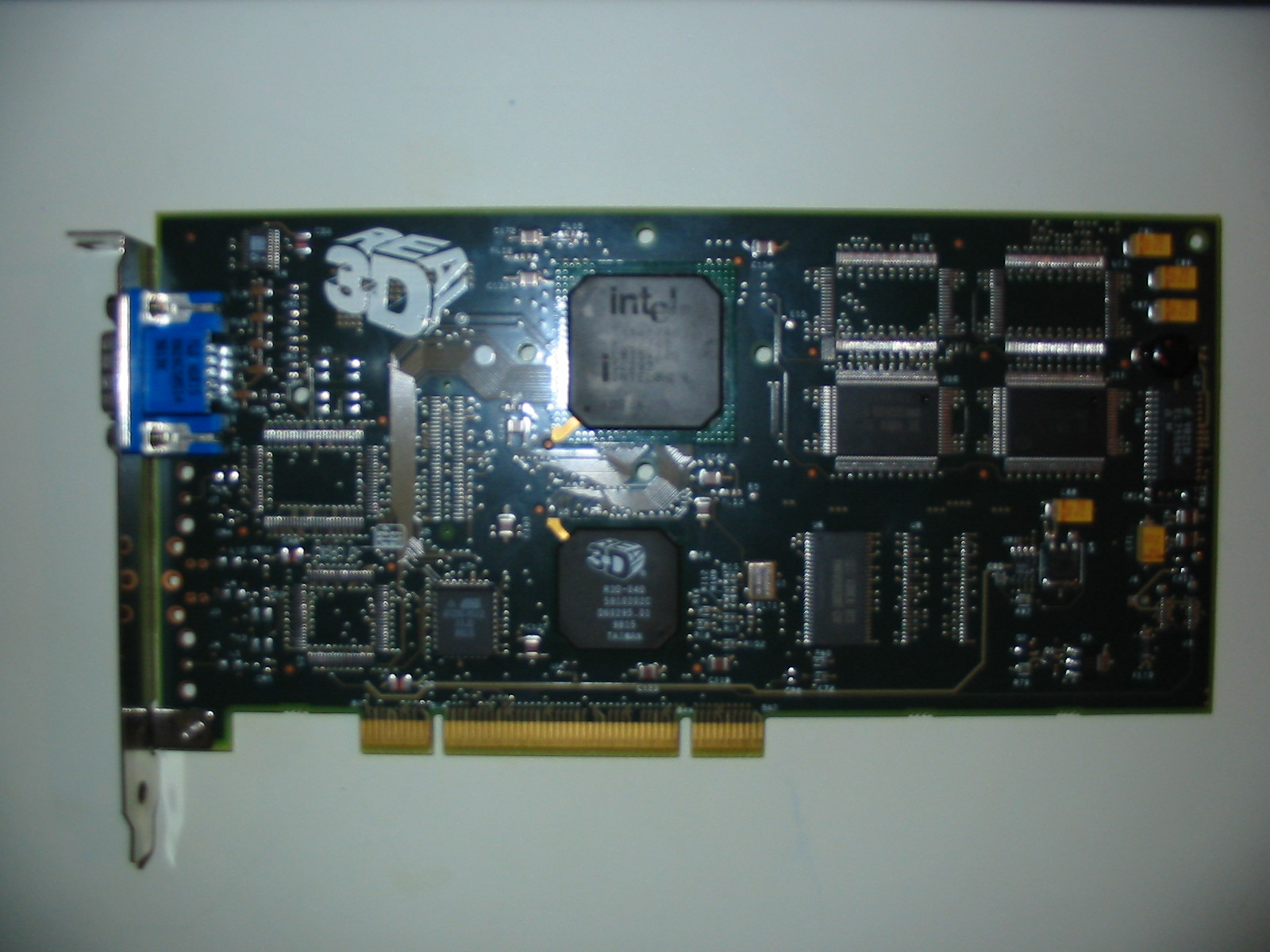
Real3D video card with Intel740

Real3D, Inc. was a maker of arcade graphics boards, a spin-off from Lockheed Martin. The company made several 3D hardware designs that were used by Sega, the most widely used being the graphics hardware in the Sega Model 2 and Model 3 arcade systems. A partnership with Intel and SGI led to the Intel740 graphics card, which was not successful in the market. Rapid changes in the marketplace led to the company being sold to Intel in 1999.

== History ==
The majority of Real3D was formed by research and engineering divisions originally part of GE Aerospace. Their experience traces its way back to the Project Apollo Visual Docking Simulator, the first full-color 3D computer generated image system. GE sold similar systems of increasing complexity through the 1970s, but were never as large as other companies in the simulator space, like Singer Corporation or CAE.

When Jack Welch took over General Electric in 1981 he demanded that every division in the company be 1st or 2nd in its industry, or face being sold off. GE Aerospace lasted longer than many other divisions, but was eventually sold off to Martin Marietta in 1992. In 1995, Martin Marietta and Lockheed merged to form Lockheed Martin Corporation, the world’s largest defense contractor.

Following the merger, Lockheed Martin decided to market their graphics technology for civilian use. In January 1995 they set up Real3D and formed a relationship with Sega. This led to the company's most successful product run, designing the 3D hardware using in over 200,000 Sega Model2 and Model3 arcade systems, two of the most popular systems in history.

The company also formed a partnership with Intel and Chips and Technologies to introduce similar technology as an add-in card for PC's, a project known as "Auburn". This project became a showcase for the Accelerated Graphics Port system being introduced by Intel, which led to several design decisions that hampered the resulting products. Released in 1998 as the Intel740, the system lasted less than a year in the market before being sold off under the StarFighter and Lightspeed brandnames.

By 1999 both relationships were ending, and Lockheed Martin was focusing on its military assets. On 1 October 1999 the company closed, and its assets were sold to Intel on the 14th. ATI hired many of the remaining employees for a new Orlando office. 3dfx Interactive had sued Real3D on a patent basis, and Intel's purchase moved the lawsuits to the new owner. Intel settled the issue by selling all of the intellectual property back to 3dfx.

By this point, nVidia had acquired all of SGI's graphics development resources, which included a 10% share in Real3D. This led to series of lawsuits, joined by ATI. The two companies were involved in lawsuits over Real3D's patents until a 2001 cross-licensing settlement.
