= Mike Hawash =

American engineer (born 1964)

- Born: Maher Mofeid Hawash; December 12, 1964 (age 61); Nablus, West Bank, Palestine
- Status: Released in 2009
- Citizenship: American
- Education: University of Texas at Arlington
- Occupation: Engineer
- Criminal charge: Conspiring to aid the Taliban in fighting against U.S. allies in Afghanistan
- Penalty: 7 years in prison

Details
- Date apprehended: March 20, 2003

Maher Mofeid "Mike" Hawash (born December 12, 1964) is an American engineer who was convicted and sentenced to a seven-year prison sentence in 2003 for conspiring to aid the Taliban in fighting against U.S. forces and their allies in Afghanistan. Six weeks after 9/11, Hawash secretly traveled to China with a group of Portland-area Muslims, dubbed the Portland Seven, with the intent of entering Afghanistan to aid the Taliban. Hawash and his fellow conspirators were unable to reach Afghanistan due to visa problems, according to federal authorities.

Over a year later, after continuing to live and work near Portland, Hawash was arrested outside his office at Intel, setting off a heated debate about material witness arrest and detention and the Patriot Act, and galvanizing a movement to free Hawash. Hawash eventually pleaded guilty to conspiring to aid the Taliban in exchange for a reduced, seven-year sentence. He was released from prison in early 2009.

== Background ==
Mike Hawash was born in Nablus in the West Bank on December 12, 1964. A Jordanian citizen, in 1990 Hawash became a naturalized U.S. citizen.

Hawash emigrated to the United States in 1984 and attended the University of Texas at Arlington where he obtained degrees in Computer Science and Engineering. He was employed by Compaq as an engineer from 1989 through 1992, when he was hired by Intel and moved to Portland, Oregon. Hawash worked at Intel’s Israel facility from 1994 to 1996 and continued working for Intel until 2001. He was co-author of the 1997 book DirectX, RDX, RSX, and MMX Technology. In 1995, he married a Christian woman from rural Oregon, and together they had two children. Hawash's wife had a child from a previous marriage.

=== Hawash becomes an increasingly fundamentalist Muslim ===
Around 2000, Hawash began to drift toward a more fundamentalist Islam, in part as a reaction to the death of his father.

He grew a beard and covered his head with a prayer cap. He asked those who had known him for years as Mike to, please, call him Maher. He paid off the mortgage on his house, because Islam forbids paying interest on loans. And he became a regular attendee at Masjed as-Saber, the Islamic Center of Portland, a more fundamentalist place of worship than the Bilal Mosque, which he previously attended and which was closer to his home.

Masjed as-Saber was a major donor to the Global Relief Foundation, a Muslim charity "shut down in late 2001 over allegations of fund-raising and money-laundering for terrorist groups," and a charity to which Hawash had contributed $10,000.

After the 9/11 attacks, according to neighbors, Hawash became increasingly withdrawn and unfriendly. Hawash later testified that he believed Muslims could not have been responsible for the 9/11 attacks, and that "retaliation against the Taliban for harboring al Qaeda in Afghanistan was wrong."

== Hawash and the Portland Seven ==
According to federal authorities, Hawash met the other conspirators, later dubbed the Portland Seven, at his new mosque. These included Habis Abdulla al Saoub, a Jordanian; Muhammad Ibrahim Bilal and his brother, Ahmed Ibrahim Bilal, Americans of Saudi heritage; as well as Jeffrey Leon Battle and Patrice Lumumba Ford, two African-American Muslims, and October Martinique Lewis (Battle's ex-wife).

"The men began calling themselves muhajid and referring to Saoub as their emir. They adopted the name Katibat al Mawt — The Squad of Death."

Hawash traveled alone to China, meeting up with the other five men. After numerous unsuccessful attempts by the group to obtain visas to gain entry into Afghanistan, Hawash returned to the United States, where he arranged to get $2,000 to al Saoub in China.

In October 2002, the six members of the group other than Hawash were indicted and four were arrested. Ahmed Bilal and Al Saoub remained fugitives.

In March 2003, Hawash was also arrested as a material witness, and after a five-week detention was charged. In September 2003 the group, now dubbed "The Portland Seven", "were all named in the 15-count superseding indictment that included charges of conspiracy to levy war against the United States, conspiracy to provide material support and resources to al Qaeda, conspiracy to contribute services to al Qaeda and the Taliban, conspiracy to possess and discharge firearms in furtherance of crimes of violence, possessing firearms in furtherance of crimes of violence and money laundering."

== Arrest and detention ==
On March 20, 2003, federal authorities arrested Hawash in the parking lot of Intel. He is reported to have said, “I’ve been expecting you.” Hawash was initially arrested and detained as a material witness and was held for over five weeks without charge. During this period, Hawash declined to testify before a grand jury, invoking his Fifth Amendment right. He was eventually charged with traveling to China to aid the Taliban.

As Hawash was arrested, his house was searched by armed FBI agents in the presence of his wife and their three children. Hawash's wife later told authorities that her husband had told her that he had been in China on business.

== Hawash as cause célèbre ==
Hawash became a cause célèbre due to the nature of his arrest: he was held in solitary confinement and with limited access to attorneys for over five weeks under a material witness warrant, and evidence against him was sealed and presented in closed court. This sparked some elements of the controversy surrounding Hawash's arrest and detention.

Hawash's former boss, Intel Vice-President Steven McGeady, led a group of former Intel employees who protested Hawash's detention without charge and demanded his release. They staged protests and set up a defense fund and website. The New York Times quoted McGeady describing Hawash's pre-trial detention as "Alice in Wonderland meets Franz Kafka."

After Hawash was formally charged, McGeady, acting as spokesman for Hawash's family, said "People who know Mike believe the idea that Mike would have fought for the Taliban in Afghanistan is completely absurd and that he ultimately will be cleared" and “We hope that once a jury hears what happened, they’ll realize that a mistake was made.”

Hawash's attorney, Stephen Houze said “It’s our intention to shed the light of day on what has been a dark cloud of secrecy,” stating that he would use his pre-trial discovery powers to compel the United States to declassify any evidence it plans to use in the case. “This is America,” he added. “We have an open court system.”

== Evidence against Hawash ==
Some of the evidence against Hawash and the Portland Seven was gathered by Khalid Mustafa, a "small-time criminal" who infiltrated Hawash's mosque and recorded conversations with Battle.

Mustafa's wire picked up details of the group's trip to China, as well as some of the most chilling detail in the indictment -- Battle talking about retaliating against Jews in Portland. "So if every time they hurt or harm a Muslim over there, you go into that synagogue and hurt one over here," Battle said on tape.

The most significant evidence against Hawash and the Portland Seven was gathered (under provisions from the USA Patriot Act) from emails the men had sent each other.

== Sentencing ==
In August 2003, Hawash surprised his supporters by pleading guilty to one charge in exchange for a reduced sentence.

According to Fox News, Hawash pleaded guilty to conspiring to provide services to the Taliban. Prosecutors agreed to drop charges of conspiring to levy war against the United States and conspiring to provide material support for terrorism. U.S. District Judge Robert E. Jones asked Hawash during the hearing "You and the others in the group were prepared to take up arms, and die as martyrs if necessary, to defend the Taliban. Is this true?" Hawash replied "Yes, your honor."

In his allocution at sentencing he noted he had had misgivings on the way and had come home shortly afterward. "It's something that I have done that is completely out of my character," Hawash said. "It's not something ingrained in me or something that I do. It was just a diversion in my life, and I clearly know that it's an unlawful act that I have done." Hawash also noted that the federal government had treated him fairly and with dignity.

Hawash received a seven-year sentence (as opposed to a potential twenty-year sentence) in exchange for testifying against some of his fellow conspirators. Sentencing Judge Jones commented to Hawash at his sentencing that "you hurt your religion very deeply," and that Hawash had offered to cooperate with the government only after being indicted. The judge went on to say "I'm convinced that you will never again commit a criminal act."

The other living members of the Portland Seven were also sentenced in separate trials: Habis al Saoub was never captured and has been confirmed dead by authorities in Afghanistan. Ford and Battle are each serving eighteen-year sentences. Lewis, who did not travel with the group, was sentenced to three years in a federal prison camp. Muhammad Bilal received an eight-year sentence, while Ahmed Bilal got ten years.

== Aftermath ==
According to the Assistant U.S. attorney who prosecuted the case, "This was an important case in the battle against terrorism. It's one example of a number of cases around the country where a small group of people are enamored of the concept of violent jihad. These people are dangerous. They need to be stopped."

Reactions among Hawash's supporters were mixed. "The group offered to refund any of the $25,000 that had been collected earlier, and a few donors took them up on it."

Hawash was released from prison in 2009, after serving most of his seven-year sentence.
