= Torture by proxy =

Collusion by one government in the abuse of prisoners by another

Torture by proxy is collusion by one government in the abuse of prisoners by another. The United States has rendered prisoners to nations known to practice torture. In the case of the United Kingdom, the government of Prime Minister Tony Blair is alleged to have colluded in the torture of prisoners by Libya.

The frequency with which the US government has chosen to employ the practice of transferring prisoners to countries that practice torture has fluctuated from one administration to the next. Before the September 11 attacks, renditions to countries that practice torture were sporadic and ad hoc. Afterwards, the Bush administration created a dedicated rendition bureaucracy and streamlined procedures which radically expanded abductions for torture by proxy, most commonly sending victims to be abused in Egypt, sometimes to Syria and Morocco. Despite protestations that it does not condone torture, recently the Obama administration has been accused of transferring prisoners to face brutal treatment in Afghanistan, Iraq, and Somalia.

Colluding governments use proxy torturers in order to support the deception that they have no knowledge of, or participation in, torture.
