= Intel i750 =

Two-chip graphics processor from Intel

The Intel i750 is a two-chip graphics processing unit composed of the 82750PB pixel processor and 82750DB display processor. The i750 chip was used in video capture/compression cards such as the Intel Smart Video Recorder and Creative Labs Video Blaster RT300. These cards were needed to allow Video for Windows to record footage from a video camera.

Although Intel had made earlier chips targeting graphics (e.g., 82786 graphics coprocessor), this could be considered as Intel's first attempt to break into the video controller marketplace. The effort was a failure and led to Intel leaving the market for some time. The Indeo video compressor was originally built to work with the i750, but was later ported to other systems as well.

== Technical Details ==
=== 82750PA ===
82750PA Pixel Processor which has the performance of 12.5 MIPS and it has features of video/graphic instruction that perform operations in parallel and that brings together motion video, stills and graphics into a single video frame.

=== 82750DA ===
82750DA Display Processor which supplies resolution modes and pixel formats supporting up to 1024 pixels in horizontal resolution and 585 pixels in vertical resolution. It also supports up to 16.8 million of colors.

=== 82750PB ===
The 82750PB pixel processor is packaged in a 132-pin PQFP running at 25 MHz. It contains 57 instruction set, eight entries 64 bit vector registers (same MM0~MM7 register naming as used on the x86, the only difference being that i750 has dedicated registers while the x86 MMX CPU does not. However, the i750 lacks general purpose integer registers unlike its x86 counterpart), a 64-bit ALU, a 512×48-bit instruction RAM, a 512×16-bit data RAM, two internal 16-bit buses, a wide instruction word processor, a variable length sequence decoder, a pixel interpolator and an interface supporting a 4 GB linear address space. These features make it capable of text, 2D and 3D graphics, video compression, and real-time video decompression and video effects. It can support up to 30 frames per second. It supports video RAM interface which it compress and store, or retrieve and decompress data. It also can decompress high-resolution JPEG still image in approximately one second per image. This processor was available for US$49 in 1,000-unit quantities.

=== 82750DB ===
The 28-MHz 82750DB display processor supports variable bits per pixel, pixels per line, and pixel widths allowing trading-offs in image quality vs. refresh rate and VRAM requirements. It performs two-dimensional UV, translate from YUV digital video format, and generates CRT synchronization and control signals. It also supports VGA, NTSC, PAL and SECAM video formats. It is in 132-pin PQFP format. This processor was available for US$56 in 1,000-unit quantities.

=== 82750PD ===
Intel's low-cost i750 processor, 82750PD, and ATI's 68890 video capture Chip for video-only boards. It now supports the Shared Frame Buffer Interconnect (SFBI) specification which reduced the components requires to create video-capturing subsystem. It uses the Intel's Indeo software to process compression/decompression streaming coding. This specification defines a 32- or 64-bit shared multi-master memory bus to share a single frame buffer with other SFBI-compatible devices. Samples were available in first quarter of 1994 for USD $40 each in 100,000 quantities.

== See also ==
- Intel740
