= D.C. Five =

Five Muslim Americans detained in 2009

The D.C. Five is a group of Muslim Americans from the suburbs of Washington, D.C., with suspected ties to terrorism. The five men were detained on December 9, 2009, during a police raid in Pakistan on a house with links to a militant group. In part of an increasing trend in homegrown terrorism, they were in their late teens or early twenties.

Early in the ongoing investigation, officials described them as en route to fight against American forces in Afghanistan. The police chief of Sargodha said that the men had been in contact with local militant groups since August 2009 and had offered their assistance in unspecified attacks. They were not initially accused of a crime. They had been missing from their home area for approximately a month prior to their detention.

On June 24, 2010, the five men were sentenced to 10 years imprisonment; both the defense and the prosecution are planning to appeal.

== Overview ==
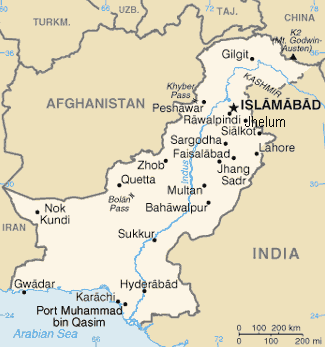
Map showing the cities the five passed through: Karachi, Hyderabad, Lahore, and Sargodha, where they were detained.

The men departed from the Dulles International Airport and traveled to Karachi, Pakistan, and then to Hyderabad and to Lahore. They spent five days there before they finally arrived at Sargodha. They landed in Karachi on November 20. One of the men had left an 11 min video that expressed his belief that Muslim lands must be defended against western invaders. However, it was not described as a typical suicide (jihad) video for militants.

According to investigators, the men had planned to meet a contact close to the Afghan border, between Punjab and the North-West Frontier Province, and then to proceed to the stronghold of the Taliban and al-Qaeda. That contact turned out to be a Taliban recruiter named Saifullah, whom Minni had met on the internet after the latter posted remarks praising video footage on YouTube showing attacks on American forces.

The house at which they were detained in Sargodha, Punjab Province, was occupied by Khalid Farooq. He is the father of one of the men, and he is suspected of ties to Jaish-e-Muhammed, a banned militant group to which the house itself is also linked. The house is owned by the uncle of one of the men. According to the Federal Bureau of Investigation, the men "were detained without incident."

Investigators stated that the men were on route to Afghanistan to fight for the Taliban against NATO forces. The investigators mentioned that the men had planned to go from Sargodha to South Waziristan, an unguarded region used by militant groups for training purposes.

Pakistani officials said that men were a security threat and that they had been arrested before they could mount an attack. A prosecutor in the case, Nadeem Akram Cheema, said that based upon their contact with a Taliban recruiter, "They wanted to be part of an operation. They and their handlers did not have enough time to plan a meticulous attack and were nabbed before they could."

The men have said that they were on route to Afghanistan to perform charity and humanitarian work in assisting Muslim refugees. Listed on their visa applications as the purpose of travel, however, was attending a friend's wedding in Karachi and sightseeing in Lahore and Sargodha.

== Suspects ==
Some of the suspects were born outside the U.S., but all of them are U.S. citizens. However, the U.S. embassy in Pakistan said that one of them did not have a U.S. passport.

They knew one another from the ICNA Center, a mosque affiliated with Islamic Circle of North America in Arlington, Virginia. The five were a "constant presence" at the mosque in "traditional Muslim dress." The men had been missing since late November 2009. Their families contacted local religious authorities, who then contacted the FBI on December 1. Members of the mosque were unaware of the men's plans and had not previously come to the attention of law enforcement agencies.

Their names are Umer Farooq, Ramy Zamzam, Ahmed Abdullah, Waqar Khan, and Aman Yasir. Ahmed Abdullah was later identified as Ahmed Abdullah Minni.

- Umer Farooq is the son of Khalid Farooq, the occupant of the house in Pakistan in which they were detained. He lives on the same street as the mosque with his father and his mother, Sabrina, who operates a computer business. Khalid, who immigrated to the US some 20 years ago, and Sabrina were in Sargodha when their son and the others showed up. Khalid was initially detained as well but was later released.
- Ramy Zamzam, 22 (at the time of his detention), is from an Egyptian family and is a dental student at the historically black Howard University. He has a bachelor's degree in biology and chemistry from Howard. Zamzam was active in the Muslim Students' Association D.C. Council and was described by another college student he had met through the council as "very devout; he wouldn't date women" but not explicitly political. He performed the Hajj in 2007 and returned "even more intensely observant." Pakistani Police described him as the leader of the five.
- Ahmed Abdullah Minni also lived on the same street as the mosque with his family, which runs a day care center. He is described as a "native of Eritrea." Minni was on the wrestling team at West Potomac High School in Fairfax County, Virginia, where he was described as friendly and not at all disenfranchised.
- Waqar Khan, 22, was convicted a year before the arrests for stealing packages from UPS, where he had worked at the time. He was given a one-year suspended sentence and served two months of supervised probation. He is of Pakistani descent.
- Aman Hassan Yasir is from a family that is originally from either Yemen or Ethiopia.

== Investigation ==
The Jaish-e-Muhammed flag

On December 11, 2009, the FBI questioned the five men separately, as it wanted them to return to the U.S., but was uncertain as to whether they would be deported. The five were not immediately charged under Pakistani law, and it was not known what charges they may face in the U.S. The minister of law in Punjab, Rana Sanaullah, said that the Pakistani government was interested in determining the group's affiliations before it handed them over to U.S. officials and the Interior Minister of Pakistan, Rehman Malik, wanted them cleared of any crimes in Pakistan before any extradition. The police confiscated the men's computers, cellphones, and an iPod.

As of December 14, the High Court of Lahore was awaiting further information in the case before it ruled on the issue of the extradition of the five men, which the U.S. had not yet sought. Police involved in the case said that the men had been in contact with militant groups since August 2009 and had offered to assist those groups in attacks.

Police initially accused two men of having contacts in al-Qaeda, a charge that they denied. According to a lawyer for the defense, Hassan Dastgir Katchela, the prosecutors' case is based upon an alleged e-mail from an al-Qaeda operative to the men. The five men deny any such E-mail exists. An advocate, Ameer Abdullah Rokri, of the group said they had no plans to seek training in terrorist tactics and that they intended to go to Afghanistan to work with refugees there. As of January 4, 2010, Pakistani authorities had made a number of allegations against the men, most notably of attempting to engage in terrorism, and police were planning to seek life sentences. The five may be charged "waging war against Pakistan" and "planning terrorist attacks in the country."

In mid-January 2010, the men appeared in a special anti-terrorism court in Sargodha, where the police detailed the charges against them. Police officials presented the judge with a 250-page charge sheet, which contained evidence that the men had met with the Jaish-e-Muhammed militant group in Hyderabad. According to a member of the police, Usman Anwar, the men admitted their desire to wage jihad and that they had donated money to banned militant groups. The men's legal representative, Khalid Khawaja, said the men alleged that "they have been tortured and not treated properly." They also shouted that allegation as they were led away from the court. Prison officials denied the allegations of torture. Anwar described the men as being "brainwashed" to the "jihadi" cause to the extent that they attempted to convert him to the cause.

The defense sought to have the men released on bail on the grounds of lack of evidence, but the request was rejected by the presiding judge, Anwar Nazeer. The trial was set for March 17, 2010, according to the public prosecutor, Naveed Akram Cheema and a Pakistani court has blocked the men's extradition. The hearing on March 17 was adjourned by Judge Anwar Nazeer until March 31. On March 31, a hearing in the Sargodha Jail was adjourned until April 17. A U.S. delegation was in attendance.

The Pakistani government, on April 17, presented its evidence, including documents, phone logs, e-mails and 13 witnesses. In addition, they announced the name of the militant linked to al-Qaeda, Qari Saifullah Akhtar, with whom the five men have been accused of conspiring. Akhtar is the leader of Harkat-ul-Jihad al-Islami, a Pakistani militant group formed in the 1980s and suspects of having to ties to both al-Qaeda and the Taliban.

Dastagir, a lawyer for the defense, alleged the evidence had been fabricated by the police and said he would present evidence sufficient to prove the men's innocence.

== Charges ==
The five young men were formally charged on Wednesday, March 17, 2010, in a closed hearing in Sargodha. Each of the charges against the five men are related to terrorism. According to Hassan Katchela, a defense lawyer, each of the five was charged with, as reported by The New York Times, five charges:

1. plotting attacks in Afghanistan, an ally of Pakistan, which carries a life sentence
2. planning attacks against allies of Pakistan and within Pakistan
3. raising money to commit terrorism
4. planning assaults on a Pakistani nuclear power plant
5. planning attacks on Pakistani air force bases in Sargodha and Mianwali

The Wall Street Journal also reported five charges, adding "directing a person to commit a terrorist act," and without the last two reported by The Times and the second of them listed as two separate charges: "criminal conspiracy to commit terrorism in Pakistan [and] planning to wage war against a friendly country." According to The Washington Post, six charges were brought against them, the five mentioned by The Times, in addition to directing a person or an organization to commit terrorist activities which also carries a possible life sentence. They were accused by the judge of directing one another to commit acts of terrorism.

The charges not carrying possible life sentences carry sentences of up to seven years. Nadeem Akram Cheema, a public prosecutor involved in the case said, "We will try to get the maximum punishment and we have all the evidence." That they were formally charged indicates that it is unlikely that they will be deported to the U.S. in the near future. The men plead not guilty and now await the next phase of the trial, a hearing on March 31, 2010, in which the prosecution will present its evidence against them. The men's Advocates expected the trial to go on for at least six months. and the case will be heard before a judge, in an anti-terrorism court in Sargodha.

=== Sentencing ===
On Thursday, June 24, 2010, Judge Mian Anwar Nazir found the five men guilty. The men were sentenced to 10 years imprisonment and fines of $823 for conspiring against the state and an additional 5 years for financing a militant organization; both sentences are scheduled to run concurrently. The men's lawyer, Hasan Katchela, described the men as disappointed in the sentence and planned to appeal saying, "We are surprised, we were not expecting this decision. The families want to challenge the verdict in high court." Rana Bukhtiar, the deputy prosecutor general of Punjab, said that the prosecutors in the case sought to appeal the sentencing to have it increased as they initially had sought the maximum penalty, 25 years in jail. The judge dismissed the remaining charges that had been leveled against the men including directing others to commit terrorism, which could have resulted in a sentence of life imprisonment. The FBI and other U.S. agencies were initially involved in the case, but a lawyer for the men's families, Nina Ginsburg, criticized what she claimed was "the lack of involvement by the U.S. government to protect the rights". A spokesman for the State Department, P.J. Crowley, said that embassy officials had monitored the progress of the case and that they have "met periodically with each individual and have not seen any evidence of mistreatment[... and] will continue to…support them during the appeals process."

== Torture allegations ==
According to Nihad Awad, the executive director of Council on American-Islamic Relations, said that the families of each of the men had received letters from them, all claiming to have been tortured. The alleged torture included beatings; threats of electrocution; deprivation of sleep, food and water; and being choked by a guard. One of the men stated in letter dated March 10, "They beat the hell out of me and the rest of us until we said what they wanted us to say. Wallahi (by God) they even threatened to electrocute us the day before court so we don't tell the judge but we spoke out." The author of the letter was identified as Zamzam, and Pakistani officials have not responded to the letter's allegations.

The men claimed that the torture was meted out by Pakistani Police and FBI agents, however, both U.S. and Pakistani authorities have denied the allegations. The men also claimed that the torture was directed by U.S. officials, which was denied by Pakistani prison official and the U.S. Consulate in Islamabad. "Skeptics" dismissed the men's claims as a response that had been learned through terrorist training for the purpose of using claims of torture as propaganda. A defense Counsel, Hasan Dastagir, said, "My clients were in good shape and high spirits." On March 17, the men's defense lawyers requested an investigation of Pakistani Police and intelligence agencies regards their clients treatments. Hassan Dastgir Katchela, a lawyer with the defense, stated that there had been no further instance of abuse in the month prior to March 18. The U.S. State Department expressed their concerns of possible abuse to Pakistani officials previously, however, the U.S. government is satisfied that the trial was progressing openly.

== See also ==
- Portland Seven
