= Indeo =

Audio and video formats by Intel

- Filename extension: ivf
- Internet media type: video/x-ivf, video/x-indeo
- Developed by: Intel Architecture Labs
- Initial release: November 1992; 33 years ago
- Latest release: 5.11; 2000; 26 years ago
- Type of format: compressed video
- Contained by: AVI
- Extended from: DVI

Indeo Video (commonly known now simply as "Indeo") was a family of audio and video formats and codecs first released in 1992 and discontinued in 2000, and designed for real-time video playback on desktop CPUs. While its original version was related to Intel's DVI video stream format, a hardware-only codec for the compression of television-quality video onto compact discs, Indeo was distinguished by being one of the first codecs allowing full-speed video playback without using hardware acceleration. Also unlike Cinepak and TrueMotion S, the compression used the same Y'CbCr 4:2:0 colorspace as the ITU's H.261 and ISO's MPEG-1. Indeo use was free of charge to allow for broadest usage.

== History ==
During the development of what became the P5 Pentium microprocessor, the Intel Architecture Labs implemented one of the first, and at the time highest-quality, software-only video codecs, which was marketed as "Indeo Video". It has been developed since the 1980s based on the hardware-only Digital Video Interactive (DVI) which was previously developed by General Electric. Indeo was first released in 1992 along with Microsoft's Video for Windows platform. At its public introduction, it was the only video codec supported in both the Microsoft (Video for Windows) and Apple Computer's QuickTime software environments, as well as by IBM's software systems of the day. It was sold to Ligos Corporation in 2000.

Intel produced several different versions of the codec between 1993 and 2000, based on very different underlying mathematics and having different features.

Though Indeo saw significant usage in the mid-1990s, it remained proprietary. Intel slowed development and stopped active marketing, and it was quickly surpassed in popularity by the rise of MPEG codecs and others, as processors became more powerful and its optimization for Intel's chips less important. Indeo still saw some use in video game cutscene videos, such as in 1998's Police Quest: SWAT 2.

== Formats ==
The original format was designed for real-time playback on low-end Intel CPUs (i386 and i486), optionally supported by specialized decoder hardware (for example, Intel i750 on an Intel ActionMedia II expansion card). Decoding complexity was significantly lower than with contemporary MPEG codecs (H.261, MPEG-1 Part 2).

The codec was highly asymmetrical, meaning that it took much more computation to encode a video stream than to decode it. Intel's ProShare video conferencing system took advantage of this, using hardware acceleration to encode the stream (and thus requiring an add-in card), but allowing the stream to be displayed on any personal computer.

=== Indeo 2 ===
Indeo 2, previously known as Real-Time Video 2, works by delta coding pixels line by line, either against the temporally or spatially directly preceding line, coupled with static Huffman coding. Indeo 2.1 was included in the 1992 Video for Windows 1.0 add-on for Windows 3.1, which required at least a 386SX processor.

=== Indeo Video 3 ===
Indeo Video 3 is a traditional DCT-based transform coding format designed for video playback from CD-ROM that is very similar to the competing Cinepak. It uses chroma subsampling, delta encoding, vector quantization, run-length encoding and motion compensation (inter-frame coding) with a recommended key-frame interval of 4 and has distinctly asymmetric runtime characteristics.

=== Indeo Video Interactive ===
Indeo Video Interactive had greater computational complexity and was aimed at video game developers. It was based on wavelet transforms and included novel features such as chroma-keyed transparency and hot spot support. Initially, there was no support for Apple systems. Two variants of this technology were produced: Indeo Video 4 and 5. The format was never officially documented but later reverse engineered to allow for third-party decoders.

=== Indeo Audio Coder ===
Indeo Audio Coder is a transform coding format based on the modified discrete cosine transform (MDCT).

=== Indeo Version 5 ===
Proprietary bitstream encoding for video, originally developed by Intel. The technology was sold in 2000 to Ligos Corporation. John McGowan states that Indeo 5 employs a wavelet algorithm and other encoding features; its predecessor Indeo 4 employs a presumably similar "hybrid wavelet algorithm". Windows implementations of Indeo have been distributed by Ligos. Apple distributed Mac versions for "classic" operating systems through OS 9, but there is no MacOS support for Mac OS X.

== Implementations ==
Official Indeo 5 decoders exist for Microsoft Windows, the classic Mac OS, BeOS R5 and the XAnim player on Unix. Reverse engineered decoders for versions 2, 3, 4 and 5 were introduced in FFmpeg between 2003 and 2011. Indeo version 3 (IV31 and IV32), 4 (IV41) and 5 (IV50) are supported by MPlayer and XAnim. Version 5.11 is freeware and may be used on all 32-bit versions of Windows prior to Vista. Version 5.2 has been created for XP and is available for purchase from the official website for use only with Windows 95, 98, ME, NT, 2000 and XP. This includes support for Indeo Video 4.5 and Indeo Audio 2.5 codecs but the version 3.2 video codec has been removed since the original release of Indeo XP for Windows. Although Indeo video is not officially supported by Windows Vista and Windows 7, simply entering the following into the command prompt might enable the playback of Indeo encoded video: regsvr32 ir50_32.dll

=== Security advisory ===
The Microsoft Windows implementation of the Indeo codec contains several security vulnerabilities, and one should not play Indeo videos from untrusted sources. Microsoft tried to remove them in Windows XP SP1 but had to release a hotfix to add it back. The codec was originally licensed from Intel, and Microsoft likely do not have the source code that would be required to fix the vulnerabilities. On fully patched systems and all Windows Vista and later systems, the Indeo codec is partially disabled in most circumstances.

== Literature ==
- Michael Keith (Intel) (1993). "Future directions for Indeo Video". Digest of Papers. Compcon Spring. IEEE International Computer Conference (Compcon). San Francisco, CA, USA: IEEE Computer Society Press. pp. 509–513. doi:10.1109/cmpcon.1993.289725. ISBN 0-8186-3400-6.
