= Portland Seven =

American domestic terrorist cell convicted of attempting to aid al-Qaeda

The Portland Seven was a group of American Muslims from the Portland, Oregon metropolitan area who were arrested, indicted, and convicted in 2002–2003 for conspiring to travel to Afghanistan to join al-Qaeda and Taliban forces fighting against United States and coalition forces.

Originally referred to as "The Portland Six" prior to the arrest of its final member, the cell consisted of Jeffrey Leon Battle, Patrice Lumumba Ford, October Martinique Lewis, Muhammad Ibrahim Bilal, Ahmed Ibrahim Bilal, Habis Abdulla al Saoub, and Maher "Mike" Hawash.

== Background ==
On September 29, 2001, Battle, Ford and al Saoub were discovered while engaged in shooting practice in a gravel pit in Skamania County, Washington, near Washougal. Also present was Ali Khalid Steitiye, who did not become an indicted member of the Portland Seven on terrorism charges but was separately charged with other crimes.

The group was discovered by Deputy Sheriff Mark Mercer, who was acting on a tip from a neighbor who had heard gunfire in the pit. Deputy Mercer let the men go after taking their names and reported the incident to the FBI. Battle was taped in a secretly-recorded conversation indicating that they had considered killing Deputy Mercer when confronted: "We was up there blowin it up.... We was lightin' it up... [W]e looked at it as worship because what our intentions were, to learn to shoot for. And a cop came up and he was like hey... you don't understand how close he was gonna get popped... yeah, we was gonna pop him." Battle later indicated they had opted not to kill the officer because he seemed "cool." Battle, Ford, and al Saoub went on to become the core of the "Portland Seven."

According to the indictment, on October 17, 2001, Battle and al Saoub flew out of Portland International Airport en route to Afghanistan. On October 20, 2001, Ford and the two Bilals also took the same route out of the United States. Between October 2001 and January 2002, Lewis wired a series of money orders to Battle in China and Bangladesh, and in November 2001 and January 2002, Ford wired money to al Saoub in China. Ford returned to the US on or about November 19, 2001. M. Bilal returned to the U.S. on or about December 24, 2001. In January 2002, Battle was administratively discharged from the military. Battle also returned to the US on or about February 5, 2002.

The six male members of the group traveled to China in early 2002, with the intent of entering Afghanistan to aid the Taliban. Lacking visas and other documentation, they were turned back, and all but al Saoub then returned again to the United States.

On Thursday, October 3, 2002, a federal grand jury in United States District Court for the District of Oregon, at Portland, Oregon, indicted Battle, Ford, the two Bilals, al Saoub and Lewis. On October 4, 2002, and the FBI in Portland, Oregon, announced the arrest of four of those original six on charges of aiding and, in some cases, trying to join al-Qaeda fighters. Battle, Ford, and Lewis were all arrested that morning in Portland. Muhammad Bilal was arrested at the same time by the FBI in Dearborn, Michigan. The remaining two, Ahmed Bilal and al Saoub, were both considered fugitives. Steitiye was also named by the FBI as an unindicted co-conspirator.

Ali Khalid Steitiye was convicted in 2002 on firearms, fraud, and immigration charges and testified against the others in 2004, as part of a plea agreement in a weapons-possession charge.

== Origin and travel attempts ==
The core members of the group began radicalizing around 2000, frequently attending Masjed as-Saber (the Islamic Center of Portland). On September 29, 2001, just weeks after the September 11 attacks, Battle, Ford, and al Saoub were discovered by a local deputy sheriff while conducting tactical firearms training at a gravel pit in Skamania County, Washington. The deputy took their names and forwarded the incident report to the Federal Bureau of Investigation (FBI).

Between October and November 2001, the six male members traveled out of the United States in phases via China and Bangladesh, attempting to illegally cross the border into Afghanistan to fight alongside Islamic militants. Faced with strict visa restrictions and a rapidly collapsing Taliban regime, the group became stranded in China. Unable to enter Afghanistan, five of the members returned to the United States by early 2002, while al Saoub remained abroad to join an active al-Qaeda cell.

== Investigation and arrests ==
Following their return, the FBI's Joint Terrorism Task Force (JTTF) initiated an intensive investigation, deploying wiretaps and an undercover informant who recorded conversations with Battle. Battle revealed that he had explored launching domestic terrorist operations against Jewish schools, synagogues, and public centers in the United States, but focused primarily on overseas combat.

On October 4, 2002, a federal grand jury returned a 15-count indictment against the original six members, charging them with conspiracy to levy war against the United States, conspiracy to provide material support to al-Qaeda, and weapons violations. Four members were taken into custody immediately, while Ahmed Bilal and al Saoub were initially pursued as fugitives. Ahmed Bilal was later apprehended in Malaysia and extradited.

In March 2003, Maher "Mike" Hawash, a former Intel software engineer who had traveled with the group to China and wired funds to al Saoub, was arrested outside his office under a material witness warrant. His inclusion updated the group's public designation to the "Portland Seven."

== Legal outcomes and fates ==
By early 2004, all six defendants in U.S. custody had entered guilty pleas. Three of the defendants (Hawash and the Bilal brothers) agreed to fully cooperate with federal prosecutors, providing vital testimony against the cell's ringleaders.

| Member | Role / Key Charges | Legal Outcome / Sentence |
|---|---|---|
| Jeffrey Leon Battle | Core organizer; traveled to China; attempted domestic plotting. | Pleaded guilty to conspiracy to levy war against the U.S.; sentenced to 18 years in federal prison. |
| Patrice Lumumba Ford | Core organizer; traveled to China; wired funds to fugitives. | Pleaded guilty to conspiracy to levy war against the U.S.; sentenced to 18 years in federal prison. |
| Ahmed Ibrahim Bilal | Traveled to China; apprehended in Malaysia. | Pleaded guilty to conspiracy to aid the Taliban and federal weapons charges; sentenced to 10 years in prison. |
| Muhammad Ibrahim Bilal | Traveled to China. | Pleaded guilty to conspiracy and weapons charges; sentenced to 8 years in prison. |
| Maher "Mike" Hawash | Traveled to China; funded al Saoub's operations. | Pleaded guilty to conspiracy to supply services to the Taliban; cooperated with the government; sentenced to 7 years (released in 2009). |
| October Martinique Lewis | Battle's ex-wife; stayed in Portland and wired money to the cell overseas. | Pleaded guilty to money laundering; sentenced to 3 years in a federal prison camp. |
| Habis Abdulla al Saoub | Core member; remained abroad to successfully join al-Qaeda forces. | Deceased. Evaded capture and crossed into the Afghanistan-Pakistan border region. He was killed by Pakistani military forces during a clash in Waziristan in October 2003. |

Habis al Saoub joined an al Qaeda cell and was killed by Pakistani forces in October 2003. Ford and Battle are each serving 19-year sentences. Lewis was sentenced to three years in prison. Muhammad Bilal received an eight-year sentence, and Ahmed Bilal got ten years. Hawash was sentenced to seven years and left prison in early 2009.

A 2011 NPR report claimed that some of the people associated with the group were imprisoned in a highly-restrictive Communication Management Unit.

== See also ==
- D.C. Five
