= 2010 term opinions of the Supreme Court of the United States =

October 2010 to October 2011 opinions

The 2010 term of the Supreme Court of the United States began October 4, 2010, and concluded October 1, 2011. The table illustrates which opinion was filed by each justice in each case and which justices joined each opinion.

== Table key ==
Delivered the court's opinion

Joined the court's opinion

Filed a concurrence

Joined a concurrence

Filed a dissent

Joined a dissent

Filed a concurrence/dissent

Joined a concurrence/dissent

Did not participate in the decision
- Decisions that do not note an argument date were decided without oral argument. Decisions that do not note a justice delivering the court's opinion are per curiam.
- Multiple concurrences and dissents within a case are numbered, with joining votes numbered accordingly. Justices frequently join multiple opinions in a single case; each vote is subdivided accordingly.
- An asterisk ( * ) in the court's opinion denotes that it was only a majority in part or a plurality. An asterisk in a joining vote denotes that the justice joined it only in part.
- A dash ( - ) denotes that the justice voted without filing or joining an opinion.

== 2010 term opinions ==
#	Case name and citation	Argued	Decided	Roberts	Scalia	Kennedy	Thomas	Ginsburg	Breyer	Alito	Sotomayor	Kagan
1	Wilson v. Corcoran, 562 U.S. 1		November 8, 2010									
2	Abbott v. United States, 562 U.S. 8	October 4, 2010	November 15, 2010									
3	Los Angeles County v. Humphries, 562 U.S. 29	October 5, 2010	November 30, 2010									
4	Costco Wholesale Corp. v. Omega, S. A., 562 U.S. 40	November 8, 2010	December 13, 2010									
5	Madison County v. Oneida Indian Nation of N. Y., 562 U.S. 42		January 10, 2011									
6	Mayo Foundation for Medical Education & Research v. United States, 562 U.S. 44	November 8, 2010	January 11, 2011									
7	Ransom v. FIA Card Services, N. A., 562 U.S. 61	October 4, 2010	January 11, 2011									
8	Harrington v. Richter, 562 U.S. 86	October 12, 2010	January 19, 2011									
9	Premo v. Moore, 562 U.S. 115	October 12, 2010	January 19, 2011									
10	NASA v. Nelson, 562 U.S. 134	October 5, 2010	January 19, 2011		1		1 / 2					
11	Thompson v. North American Stainless, LP, 562 U.S. 170	December 7, 2010	January 24, 2011									
12	Ortiz v. Jordan, 562 U.S. 180	November 1, 2010	January 24, 2011									
13	Chase Bank USA, N. A. v. McCoy, 562 U.S. 195	December 8, 2010	January 24, 2011									
14	Swarthout v. Cooke, 562 U.S. 216		January 24, 2011									
15	Bruesewitz v. Wyeth, 562 U.S. 223	October 12, 2010	February 22, 2011									
16	CSX Transportation, Inc. v. Alabama Dept. of Revenue, 562 U.S. 277	November 10, 2010	February 22, 2011									
17	Walker v. Martin, 562 U.S. 307	November 29, 2010	February 23, 2011									
18	Williamson v. Mazda Motor of America, Inc., 562 U.S. 323	November 3, 2010	February 23, 2011				1				2	
19	Michigan v. Bryant, 562 U.S. 344	October 5, 2010	February 28, 2011		1			2				
20	FCC v. AT&T Inc., 562 U.S. 397	January 19, 2011	March 1, 2011									
21	Staub v. Proctor Hospital, 562 U.S. 411	November 2, 2010	March 1, 2011									
22	Henderson v. Shinseki, 562 U.S. 428	December 6, 2010	March 1, 2011									
23	Snyder v. Phelps, 562 U.S. 443	October 10, 2010	March 2, 2011									
24	Pepper v. United States, 562 U.S. 476	December 6, 2010	March 2, 2011						*	*		
25	Skinner v. Switzer, 562 U.S. 521	October 13, 2010	March 7, 2011									
26	Wall v. Kholi, 562 U.S. 545	November 29, 2010	March 7, 2011		*							
27	Milner v. Department of Navy, 562 U.S. 562	December 1, 2010	March 7, 2011									
28	Felkner v. Jackson, 562 U.S. 594		March 21, 2011									
29	Kasten v. Saint-Gobain Performance Plastics Corp., 563 U.S. 1	October 13, 2010	March 22, 2011				*					
30	Matrixx Initiatives, Inc. v. Siracusano, 563 U.S. 27	January 10, 2011	March 22, 2011									
31	Connick v. Thompson, 563 U.S. 51	October 6, 2010	March 29, 2011									
32	Astra USA, Inc. v. Santa Clara County, 563 U.S. 110	January 19, 2011	March 29, 2011									
33	Tolentino v. New York, 563 U.S. 123	March 21, 2011	March 29, 2011									
34	Arizona Christian School Tuition Organization v. Winn, 563 U.S. 125	November 3, 2010	April 4, 2011									
35	Cullen v. Pinholster, 563 U.S. 170	November 9, 2010	April 4, 2011				*	* / *	*	*		* / *
36	Virginia Office for Protection and Advocacy v. Stewart, 563 U.S. 247	December 1, 2010	April 19, 2011									
37	Sossamon v. Texas, 563 U.S. 277	November 2, 2010	April 20, 2011									
38	United States v. Tohono O'odham Nation, 563 U.S. 307	November 1, 2010	April 26, 2011									
39	AT&T Mobility v. Concepcion, 563 U.S. 333	November 9, 2010	April 27, 2011									
40	Montana v. Wyoming, 563 U.S. 368	January 10, 2011	May 2, 2011									
41	Bobby v. Mitts, 563 U.S. 395		May 2, 2011									
42	Schindler Elevator Corp. v. United States ex rel. Kirk, 563 U.S. 401	March 1, 2011	May 16, 2011									
43	CIGNA Corp. v. Amara, 563 U.S. 421	November 30, 2010	May 16, 2011									
44	Kentucky v. King, 563 U.S. 452	January 12, 2011	May 16, 2011									
45	General Dynamics Corp. v. United States, 563 U.S. 478	January 18, 2011	May 23, 2011									
46	Brown v. Plata, 563 U.S. 493	November 30, 2010	May 23, 2011	2	1		1			2		
47	Chamber of Commerce v. Whiting, 563 U.S. 582	December 8, 2010	May 26, 2011	*			*	1	1		2	
48	United States v. Tinklenberg, 563 U.S. 647	February 22, 2011	May 26, 2011	*	*		*					
49	Fowler v. United States, 563 U.S. 668	March 29, 2011	May 26, 2011									
50	Camreta v. Greene, 563 U.S. 692	March 1, 2011	May 26, 2011		1				2		2	
51	Ashcroft v. al-Kidd, 563 U.S. 731	March 1, 2011	May 31, 2011			1		1* / 2 / 3	1* / 2 / 3		1* / 2 / 3	
52	Global-Tech Appliances, Inc. v. SEB S. A., 563 U.S. 754	February 23, 2011	May 31, 2011									
53	Bd. of Trustees of Stanford Univ. v. Roche Molecular Sys., 563 U.S. 776	February 28, 2011	June 6, 2011									
54	Erica P. John Fund, Inc. v. Halliburton Co., 563 U.S. 804	April 25, 2011	June 6, 2011									
55	McNeill v. United States, 563 U.S. 816	April 25, 2011	June 6, 2011									
56	Fox v. Vice, 563 U.S. 826	March 22, 2011	June 6, 2011									
57	Sykes v. United States, 564 U.S. 1	January 12, 2011	June 9, 2011		1			2				2
58	Talk America, Inc. v. Michigan Bell Telephone Co., 564 U.S. 50	March 30, 2011	June 9, 2011									
59	DePierre v. United States, 564 U.S. 70	February 28, 2011	June 9, 2011		*							
60	Microsoft Corp. v. i4i Ltd. Partnership, 564 U.S. 91	April 18, 2011	June 9, 2011		2		1		2	2		
61	Nevada Comm'n on Ethics v. Carrigan, 564 U.S. 117	April 27, 2011	June 13, 2011			1				2		
62	Janus Capital Group, Inc. v. First Derivative Traders, 564 U.S. 135	December 7, 2010	June 13, 2011									
63	United States v. Jicarilla Apache Nation, 564 U.S. 162	April 20, 2011	June 13, 2011									
64	Flores-Villar v. United States, 564 U.S. 210	November 10, 2010	June 13, 2011									
65	Bond v. United States, 564 U.S. 211	February 22, 2011	June 16, 2011									
66	Davis v. United States, 564 U.S. 229	March 21, 2011	June 16, 2011									
67	J. D. B. v. North Carolina, 564 U.S. 261	March 23, 2011	June 16, 2011									
68	Smith v. Bayer Corp., 564 U.S. 299	January 18, 2011	June 16, 2011				*					
69	Tapia v. United States, 564 U.S. 319	April 18, 2011	June 16, 2011									
70	Wal-Mart Stores, Inc. v. Dukes, 564 U.S. 338	March 29, 2011	June 20, 2011					*	*		*	*
71	Borough of Duryea v. Guarnieri, 564 U.S. 379	March 22, 2011	June 20, 2011									
72	American Electric Power Co. v. Connecticut, 564 U.S. 410	April 19, 2011	June 20, 2011									
73	Turner v. Rogers, 564 U.S. 431	March 23, 2011	June 20, 2011	*						*		
74	Stern v. Marshall, 564 U.S. 462	January 18, 2011	June 23, 2011									
75	Freeman v. United States, 564 U.S. 522	February 23, 2011	June 23, 2011			*						
76	Sorrell v. IMS Health Inc., 564 U.S. 552	April 26, 2011	June 23, 2011									
77	PLIVA, Inc. v. Mensing, 564 U.S. 604	March 30, 2011	June 23, 2011			*	*					
78	Bullcoming v. New Mexico, 564 U.S. 647	March 2, 2011	June 23, 2011				*	*			*	*
79	CSX Transp., Inc. v. McBride, 564 U.S. 685	March 28, 2011	June 23, 2011				*	*				
80	Arizona Free Enterprise Club's Freedom Club PAC v. Bennett, 564 U.S. 721	March 28, 2011	June 27, 2011									
81	Brown v. Entertainment Merchants Assn., 564 U.S. 786	November 2, 2010	June 27, 2011				1		2			
82	J. McIntyre Machinery, Ltd. v. Nicastro, 564 U.S. 873	January 11, 2011	June 27, 2011			*						
83	Goodyear Dunlop Tires Operations, S. A. v. Brown, 564 U.S. 915	January 11, 2011	June 27, 2011									
84	United States v. Juvenile Male, 564 U.S. 932		June 27, 2011					-	-		-	
85	Leal Garcia v. Texas, 564 U.S. 940		July 7, 2011									
#	Case name and citation	Argued	Decided	Roberts	Scalia	Kennedy	Thomas	Ginsburg	Breyer	Alito	Sotomayor	Kagan

== 2010 term membership and statistics ==
This was the sixth term of Chief Justice Roberts' tenure, and the first term for Justice Kagan.

Justice		Appointment history		Agreement with judgment		Opinions filed				
Seniority	Name	President	Date confirmed	%	#					Total
Chief Justice	John Roberts	George W. Bush	September 29, 2005	91.7%	77/84	8	0	0	3	11
Associate Justice	Antonin Scalia	Ronald Reagan	September 26, 1986	87.1%	74/85	10	11	1	6	28
Associate Justice	Anthony Kennedy	Ronald Reagan	February 18, 1988	94.1%	80/85	11	3	0	3	17
Associate Justice	Clarence Thomas	George H. W. Bush	October 23, 1991	87.1%	74/85	9	8	0	5	22
Associate Justice	Ruth Bader Ginsburg	Bill Clinton	August 10, 1993	72.9%	62/85	9	7	1	6	23
Associate Justice	Stephen Breyer	Bill Clinton	August 3, 1994	77.6%	66/85	7	5	1	10	23
Associate Justice	Samuel Alito	George W. Bush	January 31, 2006	87.1%	74/85	7	6	1	4	18
Associate Justice	Sonia Sotomayor	Barack Obama	August 6, 2009	81.7%	67/82	7	9	0	6	22
Associate Justice	Elena Kagan	Barack Obama	August 7, 2010	76.8%	43/56	7	0	0	3	10
Notes on statistics: Opinion counts only include the bench opinions listed above; opinions relating to orders or in-chambers opinions are not included.; Agreement with the Court's judgment does not guarantee agreement with the reasoning expressed in its opinion. A justice is not considered in agreement if they dissented even in part. Agreement percentages are based only on the listed cases in which a justice participated and are rounded to the nearest one-tenth of one percentage point.						Totals				
Notes on statistics: Opinion counts only include the bench opinions listed above; opinions relating to orders or in-chambers opinions are not included.; Agreement with the Court's judgment does not guarantee agreement with the reasoning expressed in its opinion. A justice is not considered in agreement if they dissented even in part. Agreement percentages are based only on the listed cases in which a justice participated and are rounded to the nearest one-tenth of one percentage point.						75	49	4	46	174
