= Spisak =

Spisak is a surname. Notable people with this surname include:

- Jason Spisak (born 1973), American actor
- Frank Spisak (1951–2011), American neo-Nazi serial killer
