= Smith v. Spisak =

- Supreme Court of the United States

Argued October 13, 2009 Decided January 12, 2010
- Full case name: Keith Smith, Warden v. Frank G. Spisak, Jr.
- Docket no.: 08-724
- Citations: 558 U.S. 139 (more) 130 S. Ct. 676; 175 L. Ed. 2d 595
- Argument: Oral argument
- Opinion announcement: Opinion announcement

Case history
- Prior: Defendant Convicted 1983; Appeal denied (State v. Spisak, 1988); appeal to the Supreme Court of Ohio denied (State v. Spisak, 1995); petition for writ of habeas corpus denied (Spisak v. Coyle, 2003); petition granted, Sixth Circuit (Spisak v. Mitchell); cert. granted and remanded (Hudson v. Spisak, 2007); Petition reinstated, Sixth Circuit

Holding
- Jury's consideration of mitigating circumstances may be limited to circumstances the jury found only unanimously.

Court membership
- Chief Justice John Roberts Associate Justices John P. Stevens · Antonin Scalia; Anthony Kennedy · Clarence Thomas; Ruth Bader Ginsburg · Stephen Breyer; Samuel Alito · Sonia Sotomayor

Case opinions
- Majority: Breyer, joined by Roberts, Scalia, Kennedy, Thomas, Ginsburg, Alito, Sotomayor; Stevens (Part III)
- Concurrence: Stevens (in part)

Laws applied
- Antiterrorism and Effective Death Penalty Act

Smith v. Spisak, 558 U.S. 139 (2010), was a United States Supreme Court decision on the applicability of the Antiterrorism and Effective Death Penalty Act of 1996. It further examined issues of previous court decisions on jury instructions and the effectiveness of counsel.

== Background ==
Frank Spisak was an American serial killer who was convicted of three murders and one attempted murder at Cleveland State University. In February 1982, Spisak embarked on a racist, anti-Semitic shooting spree, calling it his first "seek and destroy mission" in which he was attempting to "clean up the city". Spisak was found guilty of three counts of aggravated murder and was sentenced to death.

Spisak had an accomplice, Ronald Reddish, who aided him before the shootings. Reddish was convicted of one count of attempted murder and sentenced to 7 to 25 years in prison. He was paroled in 1990.

His claims were denied by the State of Ohio in direct appeal and to the Ohio Supreme Court stating that his claim was "not well-taken on the basis of our review of the record".

Spisak filed for habeas corpus relief in the District Court for the Northern District of Ohio. First he argued that the jury instructions at the penalty phase of trial unconstitutionally required the jury to consider in mitigation only factors that the jury unanimously found mitigating (violating Mills v. Maryland, 1988). Second he argued that he had suffered significant harm because his original counsel had given an inadequate closing argument during sentencing (violating Strickland v. Washington, 1984). The District Court subsequently denied his petition.

The petition was accepted on appeal to the Sixth Circuit which blocked the State from executing Spisak. The State of Ohio appealed to the Supreme Court. In Hudson v. Spisak (552 U.S. 945, 2007) the Court remanded the case back to the Sixth Circuit and ordered the appeals court to reconsider in light of two recent cases, Schriro v. Landrigan (2007) and Carey v. Musladin (2006). The Sixth Court of Appeals again reinstated its earlier opinion. Again the State appealed and the Supreme Court granted review.

== Decision of the Court ==
The unanimous decision was handed down by Justice Breyer. The court asked two questions; "Did the Sixth Circuit disobey the directives of the Antiterrorism and Effective Death Penalty Act (AEDPA)" and "Did the Sixth Circuit exceed its authority when it presumed that Mr. Spisak suffered harm by deficient counsel?" It answered yes to both.

=== First Question ===
In Mills v. Maryland (1988), the Supreme Court ruled that when imposing the death penalty the jury must be allowed to consider any mitigating circumstances that included any part of the defendant's record. In addition the jury must be allowed to consider "any relevant mitigating evidence."

Under the AEDPA a federal court is allowed to override a state court if the state court decision was directly contrary to established Federal Law. The Court ruled that the State of Ohio had not violated the rights of the defendant by requiring the jury to only consider unanimous mitigating factors.

In addition the Court overruled the Appeals Court determination that the instructions were unconstitutional on the basis that the jury was precluded from considering other sentencing options until it had rejected the death penalty. The Court criticized the Appeals Court saying "we have not previously held jury instructions unconstitutional for this reason, Mills says nothing about this matter."

=== Second Question ===
In Strickland v. Washington (1984), the court ruled that in order for an individual to claim relief for deficient counsel the petitioner must demonstrate that the "counsel's representation fell below an objective standard of reasonableness." In addition there must be evidence that because of this deficient counsel the result would have been different.

The Court found that the counsel had done an adequate job. The court went further and stated that even if counsel had not sufficiently defended Spisak there was no reasonable probability that the outcome would have been different. Describing in detail the closing arguments of the trial Justice Stevens went as far to say that Spisak had "alienated and ostracized the jury".

== Subsequent developments ==
On February 17, 2011, Spisak was executed via lethal injection at the Southern Ohio Correctional Facility near Lucasville, Ohio.

When the Supreme Court decided Bobby v. Mitts, another AEDPA case about jury instructions during the penalty phase rather than the guilt phase, it said the case was "all but decided" by Spisak.
