= Abbott v. United States =

- Supreme Court of the United States

Argued October 4, 2010 Decided November 15, 2010
- Full case name: Kevin Abbott v. United States
- Docket no.: 09-479
- Citations: 562 U.S. 8 (more) 131 S. Ct. 18; 178 L. Ed. 2d 348
- Argument: Oral argument

Case history
- Prior: Defendant convicted and sentenced, E.D. Pa.; affirmed, 574 F. 3d 203 (3d Cir. ); cert. granted, 559 U.S. 8 (2010).

Holding
- A defendant is subject to the highest mandatory minimum specified for his conduct in 18 U.S.C. §924(c), unless another provision of law directed to conduct proscribed by §924(c) imposes an even greater mandatory minimum. Third and Fifth Circuits affirmed.

Court membership
- Chief Justice John Roberts Associate Justices Antonin Scalia · Anthony Kennedy; Clarence Thomas · Ruth Bader Ginsburg; Stephen Breyer · Samuel Alito; Sonia Sotomayor · Elena Kagan

Case opinion
- Majority: Ginsburg, joined by Roberts, Scalia, Kennedy, Thomas, Breyer, Alito, Sotomayor
- Kagan took no part in the consideration or decision of the case.

Laws applied
- 18 U.S.C. § 924(c)

Abbott v. United States, 562 U.S. 8 (2010), is a decision by the Supreme Court of the United States that addressed the mandatory sentencing increase under federal law for the possession or use of a deadly weapon in drug trafficking and violent crimes. In an 8–0 decision, the Court ruled that 18 U.S.C. § 924(c), which required a minimum five-year prison sentence, was to be imposed in addition to any other mandatory sentence given for another crime, including the underlying drug-related or violent offense. The only exception to the five-year addition applied only when another provision required a longer mandatory term for conduct violating §924(c) specifically, rather than a mandatory sentence for another crime as the defendants had unsuccessfully argued.

Abbott was the first signed opinion of the Court's 2010 term. The newly appointed Justice Elena Kagan did not participate, having disqualified herself because she had worked on the case as Solicitor General of the United States prior to joining the Court.

== Background of the case ==
=== Statutory provisions ===
18 U.S.C. § 924(c) was originally enacted as part of the Gun Control Act of 1968. §924(c)(1) prohibits using, carrying, or possessing a deadly weapon in connection with "any crime of violence or drug trafficking crime," and provides for a minimum sentence of five years in prison in addition to any other sentence imposed for the predicate crime. Congress amended the provision in 1998, to add that the five-year increase would apply "[e]xcept to the extent that a greater minimum sentence is otherwise provided by this subsection or by any other provision of law." The interpretation of this "except" clause, at 18 U.S.C. § 924(c)(1)(A), was the sole issue in Abbott v. United States.

=== Lower court proceedings ===
Kevin Abbott was convicted of drug trafficking and of being a felon in possession of a firearm, which required a fifteen-year mandatory minimum prison sentence under the Armed Career Criminal Act 18 U.S.C. § 924(e). The court added five additional years to his sentence under §924(c) for the gun possession, for a total of twenty years. Gould, in an unrelated prosecution, pleaded guilty to conspiracy to possess with intent to distribute cocaine base, which carried a ten-year mandatory minimum sentence, and to a §924(c) violation, receiving a total sentence of sixteen years and five months.

In their respective appeals, Abbott and Gould both argued that the "except" clause at §924(c) was triggered by the mandatory minimums for the other crimes for which they were sentenced: the fifteen years for Abbott as a felon-in-possession, and the ten years for Gould for drug trafficking. Congress' intent, in their view, was to ensure that convictions brought at least five years in prison, not to add on additional years. The Third Circuit in Abbott's case and the Fifth Circuit in Gould's both rejected their arguments and affirmed their sentences, ruling that the "except" clause only applied to sentences arising from violations of §924(c), not other crimes.

Abbott and Gould petitioned to the Supreme Court for review. Noting a circuit split on the issue, the Supreme Court granted certiorari and consolidated their cases for argument.

== The Court's decision ==
The Supreme Court affirmed the decisions of the Third and Fifth Circuits, upholding the imposition of the additional five-year minimum on both petitioners in an opinion delivered by Justice Ruth Bader Ginsburg.

The Court agreed with the government's statutory interpretation, that the "except" clause is triggered only when another provision commands a longer term for conduct specifically violating §924(c). The Court's view was that "Congress intended the "except" clause to serve simply as a clarification of §924(c), not as a major restraint on the statute's operation."

Gould argued that the "except" clause applied to any other mandatory minimum sentence imposed, while Abbott argued more narrowly that it applied to mandatory sentences arising from the same "criminal transaction" that constituted the §924(c) violation. Both of the petitioners' arguments, however, would often remove any penalty for a violation of §924(c) and also anomalously give shorter sentences to more serious offenders. The Court considered it implausible that Congress intended to lessen the severity of sentencing under §924(c) in 1998, particularly by doing so under a bill dubbed "An Act [t]o throttle criminal use of guns," an act that had as a "primary objective" the expansion of §924(c)'s coverage to reach firearm possession.

== See also ==
- List of United States Supreme Court cases, volume 562
