= Milner v. Department of the Navy =

- Supreme Court of the United States

Decided March 7, 2011
- Full case name: Milner v. Department of the Navy
- Citations: 562 U.S. 562 (more)
- Decision: Opinion

Holding
- FOIA's Exemption 2 only allows the government to withhold records relating to employee relations and human resources issues.

Court membership
- Chief Justice John Roberts Associate Justices Antonin Scalia · Anthony Kennedy; Clarence Thomas · Ruth Bader Ginsburg; Stephen Breyer · Samuel Alito; Sonia Sotomayor · Elena Kagan

Case opinions
- Majority: Kagan, joined by Roberts, Scalia, Kennedy, Thomas, Ginsburg, Alito, Sotomayor
- Concurrence: Alito
- Dissent: Breyer

Laws applied
- 5 U.S.C. § 552(b)(2)

Milner v. Department of the Navy, 562 U.S. 562 (2011), was a United States Supreme Court case in which the court held that the Freedom of Information Act's Exemption 2 only allows the government to withhold records relating to employee relations and human resources issues. In the 30 years before Milner, the courts of appeal had developed a different test for applying Exemption 2: Milner invalidated that test.

== Background ==
The Freedom of Information Act (FOIA) requires federal agencies to make government records available to the public, subject to nine exemptions. This case concerned Exemption 2, which allows the government to restrict the disclosure of material "related solely to the internal personnel rules and practices of an agency." This provision replaced an Administrative Procedure Act (APA) exemption for "any matter relating solely to the internal management of an agency". In Department of Air Force v. Rose, 425 U.S. 352 (1976), the Supreme Court observed that Congress had drafted Exemption 2 to give it a "narrower reach" than the old rule because the "sweep" of the phrase "internal management" had led to excessive withholding.

In Rose, the court found that Exemption 2 could not be invoked to withhold Air Force Academy honor and ethics hearing summaries. The exemption, the Court suggested, primarily targets material concerning employee relations or human resources. But the Court stated a possible caveat: That understanding of the provision's coverage governed "at least where the situation is not one where disclosure may risk circumvention of agency regulation." The D.C. Circuit subsequently converted this caveat into a new definition of Exemption 2's scope, holding that the exemption also covered any "predominantly internal" materials whose disclosure would "significantly ris[k] circumvention of agency regulation or statutes." (Note: Crooker v. Bureau of Alcohol, Tobacco & Firearms, 670 F. 2d 1051, 1056–1057, 1074.) Courts came to use use the term "Low 2" for human resources and employee relations records and "High 2" for records whose disclosure would risk circumvention of the law.

In this case, Milner submitted FOIA requests for explosives data and maps used by the Department of the Navy (Navy or Government) in storing munitions at a naval base in Washington State. Stating that disclosure would threaten the security of the base and surrounding community, the Navy invoked Exemption 2 and refused to release the data. The federal District Court granted the Navy summary judgment, and the Ninth Circuit Court of Appeals affirmed, relying on the High 2 interpretation.

== Opinion of the court ==
The Supreme Court issued an opinion on March 7, 2011. The Supreme Court rejected the Crooker doctrine and held that its "High 2" and "Low 2" interpretation "suffers from a patent flaw: It is disconnected from Exemption 2's text." In response to the government's argument that the legislative history showed a different intent, the court said "Legislative history, for those who take it into account, is meant to clear up ambiguity, not create it. ...When presented, on the one hand, with clear statutory language and, on the other, with dueling committee reports, we must choose the language."

The Court pointed out though, that agencies have "other tools at hand to shield national security information and other sensitive materials," citing to possible application of FOIA's Exemptions 1, 3, and 7. Finally, the Court pointed out that the Navy could petition Congress for relief if the existing exemptions "do not cover records whose release would threaten the Nation's vital interests".

Justice Alito issued a concurring opinion supporting the majority's textual reading of Exemption 2. Justice Alito stated that he wrote separately to "underscore the alternative argument that the Navy raised below, which rested on Exemption 7(F)."

Justice Breyer filed a dissent. He summed up his views this way:

Where the courts have already interpreted Exemption 2, where that interpretation has been consistently relied upon and followed for 30 years, where Congress has taken note of that interpretation in amending other parts of the statute, where that interpretation is reasonable, where it has proved practically helpful and achieved common-sense results, where it is consistent with the FOIA’s overall statutory goals, where a new and different interpretation would require Congress to act just to preserve a decades-long status quo, I would let sleeping legal dogs lie.

== Later developments ==
After Milner, the application of Exemption 2 became a three-step test based solely on the text of the statute. The exemption applies if (1) the information is related to "personnel" rules and practices, (2) is "solely" related to those, and (3) the information is "internal". When there is a genuine and significant public interest in disclosure, the material falls outside of Exemption 2 as that interest would preclude it from satisfying the requirements of Exemption 2 that it relate "solely" to the "internal" personnel rules and practices of the agency.
