= Execution of Steven Michael Woods Jr. =

2011 execution in Texas

Steven Michael Woods Jr.
- Born: April 17, 1980; Detroit, Michigan, U.S.
- Died: September 13, 2011 (aged 31); Huntsville Unit, Huntsville, Texas, U.S.
- Cause of death: Execution by lethal injection
- Education: Milford High School, finished 11th grade
- Known for: Tried under the Texas law of parties
- Status: Executed
- Conviction: Capital murder
- Penalty: Death (August 21, 2002)

Steven Michael Woods Jr. (April 17, 1980 – September 13, 2011) was an American who was executed by lethal injection in the state of Texas. Woods was sentenced to death after a jury convicted him of the capital murders of Ronald Whitehead, 21, and Bethena Brosz, 19, on May 2, 2001, in The Colony, Texas. Woods petitioned to media outlets for prisoner rights in February 2004.

He was incarcerated on the Texas state death row for men, located in the Allan B. Polunsky Unit (formerly the Terrell Unit) in West Livingston, Texas. In late 2006, Woods was part of a hunger strike in Polunsky, to oppose death-row inmates' treatment.

== Sentencing ==
Woods' co-defendant, Marcus Rhodes, pleaded guilty to shooting both victims to death with a firearm in the same criminal transaction and received a life sentence. During the trial, authorities were revealed to have recovered backpacks belonging to the slain pair along with shell casings and a bloodied knife in Rhodes' car. Guns used in the slayings were also recovered from the home of Rhodes' parents.

However, in Texas, the law of parties states that a person can be criminally responsible for the actions of another if he or she aids and abets, conspires with the principal, or anticipates the crime. Although Rhodes pleaded guilty to the murders and Woods did not, and no physical evidence tied Woods to the scene, Woods was executed for the crime. Witnesses testified at Woods' 2002 trial that Rhodes and he said that they lured Whitehead to an isolated road on the pretense of a drug deal and that Woods shot and killed him, because Whitehead knew about a killing 2 months earlier in California. Rhodes was later found guilty of the California murder and Woods was never tried in the case. Prosecutors said Brosz was merely driving her boyfriend Whitehead to the drug deal. Brosz had been killed because she witnessed Whitehead's death, yelled, and then attempted to flee.

=== Controversy ===
The fairness of Woods' case and punishment was criticized by Amnesty International. Woods' criminal case was reported locally and internationally. Woods' final motion for a stay was denied on September 2, 2011.

== Execution ==
In his closing remarks, Woods stated:

You're not about to witness an execution, you are about to witness a murder. I am strapped down for something Marcus Rhodes did. I never killed anybody, never. I love you, Mom. I love you, Tali. This is wrong. This whole thing is wrong. I can't believe you are going to let Marcus Rhodes walk around free. Justice has let me down. Alex Calhoun completely screwed this up! [changed from 'Alex Calhoun' to 'Somebody' in the Last Statement listed on the TDCJ Web site. Alex Calhoun was Woods' attorney.] I love you, too, Mom. Well Warden, if you are going to murder someone, go ahead and do it. Pull the trigger! It's coming. I can feel it coming. Goodbye everyone, I love you.

Woods then took several deep breaths before all body movement stopped. A needle carrying the lethal drugs into his right arm pierced a green tattoo of a rose branch. The same distinctive tattoo had identified him when he was arrested. Woods was pronounced dead on September 13, 2011, at 6:22 p.m. Woods' was the 10th execution carried out in Texas in 2011 and the 474th since Texas resumed the death penalty in 1982. Woods was the second-to-last inmate granted a special last meal before the state abolished last-meal requests in September 2011. His last meal consisted of two pounds of bacon, four fried chicken breasts, five chicken fried steaks, two hamburgers with bacon and fries, twelve garlic bread sticks with marinara, a large four meat pizza, two sweet teas, root beers, Mountain Dews and Pepsis, and two pints of ice cream. His execution came a week before Lawrence Russell Brewer's, whose well-known refusal to eat any of his extensive last meal caused Texas to end the tradition.

== See also ==
- List of people executed in Texas, 2010–2019
- List of people executed in the United States in 2011

Executions carried out in Texas
Preceded by Martin Robles August 10, 2011	Stephen Michael Woods Jr. September 13, 2011	Succeeded by Lawrence Russell Brewer September 21, 2011
Executions carried out in the United States
Preceded by Jerry Terrell Jackson – Virginia August 18, 2011	Stephen Michael Woods Jr. – Texas; September 13, 2011	Succeeded by Lawrence Russell Brewer – Texas September 21, 2011
