= Virginia Office for Protection & Advocacy v. Stewart =

- Supreme Court of the United States

Decided April 19, 2011
- Full case name: Virginia Office for Protection & Advocacy v. Stewart
- Citations: 563 U.S. 247 (more)

Holding
- Ex parte Young allows a federal court to hear a lawsuit for prospective relief against state officials brought by another agency of the same state.

Court membership
- Chief Justice John Roberts Associate Justices Antonin Scalia · Anthony Kennedy; Clarence Thomas · Ruth Bader Ginsburg; Stephen Breyer · Samuel Alito; Sonia Sotomayor · Elena Kagan

Case opinions
- Majority: Scalia, joined by Kennedy, Thomas, Ginsburg, Breyer, Sotomayor
- Concurrence: Kennedy, joined by Thomas
- Dissent: Roberts, joined by Alito
- Kagan took no part in the consideration or decision of the case.

Laws applied
- Ex parte Young

Virginia Office for Protection & Advocacy v. Stewart, 563 U.S. 247 (2011), was a United States Supreme Court case in which the court held that Ex parte Young allows a federal court to hear a lawsuit for prospective relief against state officials brought by another agency of the same state.

== Background ==
Together, the Developmental Disabilities Assistance and Bill of Rights Act of 2000 (DD Act) and the Protection and Advocacy for Individuals with Mental Illness Act (PAIMI Act) offer states federal money to improve, among other things, medical care for persons with developmental disabilities or mental illness. As a condition of funding, a state must establish a protection and advocacy (P&A) system "to protect and advocate [those people's] rights." A participating state may appoint either a state agency or a private nonprofit entity as its P&A system, but if a state agency it must have authority to litigate and freedom from the control of other state agencies or officers. Virginia has appointed an independent state agency, the Virginia Office for Protection and Advocacy (VOPA), authorizing it to litigate to secure disabled people' rights, free of executive-branch oversight; to operate independently of Virginia's attorney general; and to employ its own lawyers to sue on its behalf.

While investigating patient deaths and injuries at state mental hospitals, VOPA asked state officials in charge of those hospitals (including Stewart) to produce relevant patient records. The officials refused, asserting that a state-law privilege shielded the records from disclosure. VOPA then filed suit in federal District Court, seeking a declaration that respondents' refusal to produce the records violated the DD and PAIMI Acts and an injunction requiring respondents to produce the records and refrain in the future from interfering with VOPA's right of access. The officials moved to dismiss on the ground that they had sovereign immunity under the Eleventh Amendment to the United States Constitution, but the court held that the suit was permitted by the doctrine of a Supreme Court case called Ex parte Young. Normally, Young allows federal courts to award prospective relief against state officials for violations of federal law. The Fourth Circuit Court of Appeals reversed, finding that Ex parte Young did not apply because the suit was brought by a state agency.

== Opinion of the court ==
The Supreme Court issued an opinion on April 19, 2011.

Six justices formed the majority and joined the opinion written by Justice Scalia. The court dismissed the claim from Stewart that he was subject to sovereign immunity, citing Ex parte Young as a reason. Scalia mentioned that the Ex parte Young exception to sovereign immunity was applicable in this case.

The dissent complained that this suit divided two arms of the Commonwealth of Virginia against one another and therefore infringes on its sovereignty. The majority reasoned that this is not an overreach of federal power over a state.

=== Roberts' dissent ===
The dissent was formed by Chief Justice Roberts, who was joined by Justice Alito. Roberts argued that Ex parte Young did not apply in this case. As stated above, the dissent argued that this suit infringes on the sovereignty of Virginia and was against the Eleventh Amendment.

=== Kennedy's concurrence ===
Justice Kennedy and Justice Thomas formed the concurring opinion. They argued that while the court was right in applying the Ex parte Young doctrine, the precedent should not have been taken too far away from the Constitution for preference of a statute.
