= List of United States Supreme Court cases, volume 563 =

This is a list of all the United States Supreme Court cases from volume 563 of the United States Reports:

Case name	Citation	Date decided
Kasten v. Saint-Gobain Performance Plastics Corp.	563 U.S. 1	March 22, 2011
The Fair Labor Standards Act prohibits retaliation against workers for complaints related to violations of the act without regard to whether the complaints are oral or written.
Matrixx Initiatives, Inc. v. Siracusano	563 U.S. 27	March 22, 2011
A drug company's failure to make public reports of adverse drug reactions can constitute securities fraud even when the number of adverse reactions is not statistically significant.
Connick v. Thompson	563 U.S. 51	March 29, 2011
A district attorney's office cannot be held responsible under Section 1983 for failing to properly train its employees when the plaintiff can only prove a single violation of Brady v. Maryland.
Astra USA, Inc. v. Santa Clara Cnty.	563 U.S. 110	March 29, 2011
Medical providers, as third-party beneficiaries, may not sue drug manufacturers for selling drugs at prices higher than the discounted price required by Medicaid.
Tolentino v. New York	563 U.S. 123	March 29, 2011
Dismissed as improvidently granted.
Ariz. Christian Sch. Tuition Org. v. Winn	563 U.S. 125	April 4, 2011
Taxpayers lack standing under Article III to challenge tax credits because credits are not government spending.
Cullen v. Pinholster	563 U.S. 170	April 4, 2011
Review under AEDPA is limited to the record that was before the state court that adjudicated the claim on the merits.
Va. Office for Protection & Advocacy v. Stewart	563 U.S. 247	April 10, 2011
Ex parte Young allows a federal court to hear a lawsuit for prospective relief against state officials brought by another agency of the same state.
Sossamon v. Texas	563 U.S. 277	April 20, 2011
State officials cannot be sued in their official capacity for monetary damages under the Religious Land Use and Institutionalized Persons Act.
United States v. Tohono Oʼodham Nation	563 U.S. 307	April 26, 2011
A plaintiff cannot bring a suit in the Court of Federal Claims when they have another active suit based on substantially the same operative facts, regardless of any difference in the requested relief.
AT&T Mobility LLC v. Concepcion	563 U.S. 333	April 27, 2011
The Discover Bank test adopted by California to invalidate certain arbitration agreements with class action waivers is preempted by the Federal Arbitration Act.
Montana v. Wyoming	563 U.S. 368	May 2, 2011
Montana failed to state a claim for breach of the Yellowstone River Compact, and Wyoming's more efficient irrigation systems do not violate the Compact.
Bobby v. Mitts	563 U.S. 395	May 2, 2011
The concern addressed in Beck v. Alabama was "the risk of an unwarranted conviction," so Beck does not apply to jury instructions given at the penalty phase. Additionally, in AEDPA cases, the standard for reversal is entirely deferential to the state court's decisions unless the state court violated "clearly established" federal law as explicated by the Supreme Court.
Schindler Elevator Corp. v. United States ex rel. Kirk	563 U.S. 401	May 16, 2011
A federal agency's written response to a FOIA request for records constitutes a "report" within the meaning of the FCA's public disclosure bar.
CIGNA Corp. v. Amara	563 U.S. 421	May 16, 2011
The district court did not have authority under Section 502(a)(1)(B) of ERISA to reform CIGNA's pension plan, but Section 502(a)(3) did give the court that authority.
Kentucky v. King	563 U.S. 452	May 16, 2011
Warrantless searches conducted in exigent circumstances do not violate the Fourth Amendment as long as the police did not create the exigency by violating or threatening to violate the Fourth Amendment.
Gen. Dynamics Corp. v. United States	563 U.S. 478	May 23, 2011
When litigation would end up disclosing state secrets, courts may not try the claims and may not award relief to either party.
Brown v. Plata	563 U.S. 493	May 23, 2011
A court-mandated population limit was necessary to remedy a violation of prisoners' Eighth Amendment constitutional rights.
Chamber of Com. v. Whiting	563 U.S. 582	May 26, 2011
Arizona law instructing courts to suspend or revoke the business licenses of in-state employers that employ unauthorized aliens does not violate the Immigration Reform and Control Act of 1986.
United States v. Tinklenberg	563 U.S. 647	May 26, 2011
Under the Speedy Trial Act, the speedy trial clock stops whenever a pretrial motion is filed, regardless of whether the trial process is actually delayed by the motion or expected to be delayed.
Fowler v. United States	563 U.S. 668	May 26, 2011
When someone is charged of a killing under the federal witness-tampering statute, the state must prove a violation by showing there was a reasonable likelihood that a relevant communication would have been made to a federal officer.
Camreta v. Greene	563 U.S. 692	May 26, 2011
In the general case the Court may review a lower court's constitutional ruling at the behest of government officials who have won final judgment on qualified immunity grounds but could not for this case due to details specific to it.
Ashcroft v. al-Kidd	563 U.S. 731	May 31, 2011
United States Attorney General John D. Ashcroft could not be personally sued for his involvement in the federal detention of Abdullah al-Kidd, an American citizen, in the wake of the September 11 attacks.
Global-Tech Appliances, Inc. v. SEB S.A.	563 U.S. 754	May 31, 2011
A plaintiff alleging induced infringement must prove the defendant knew that the induced acts constitute patent infringement.
Stanford Univ. v. Roche Molecular Systems, Inc.	563 U.S. 776	June 6, 2011
The Bayh-Dole Act does not automatically vest title to federally funded inventions in federal contractors or authorize contractors to unilaterally take title to such inventions.
Erica P. John Fund, Inc. v. Halliburton Co.	563 U.S. 804	June 6, 2011
Securities fraud plaintiffs need not prove loss causation in order to obtain class certification.
McNeill v. United States	563 U.S. 816	June 6, 2011
When determining whether an offense under State law is a serious drug offense, federal sentencing courts must consult the maximum term of imprisonment for the offense at the time of conviction.
Fox v. Vice	563 U.S. 826	June 6, 2011
Reasonable fees may be granted to the defendant in a suit that involves both frivolous and non-frivolous claims, but only for costs resulting from the frivolous claims.
