= Global-Tech Appliances, Inc. v. SEB S.A. =

- Supreme Court of the United States

Argued February 23, 2011 Decided May 31, 2011
- Full case name: Global-Tech Appliances, Inc., et al., Petitioners v. SEB S.A.
- Docket no.: 10-6
- Citations: 563 U.S. 754 (more) 131 S. Ct. 2060; 179 L. Ed. 2d 1167; 2011 U.S. LEXIS 4022; 79 U.S.L.W. 4400; 98 U.S.P.Q.2d 1665

Case history
- Prior: SEB SA v. Montgomery Ward & Co., Inc., 594 F.3d 1360 (Fed. Cir. 2010); cert. granted, 562 U.S. 960 (2010).

Holding
- A plaintiff alleging induced infringement must prove the defendant knew that the induced acts constitute patent infringement.

Court membership
- Chief Justice John Roberts Associate Justices Antonin Scalia · Anthony Kennedy; Clarence Thomas · Ruth Bader Ginsburg; Stephen Breyer · Samuel Alito; Sonia Sotomayor · Elena Kagan

Case opinions
- Majority: Alito, joined by Roberts, Scalia, Thomas, Ginsburg, Breyer, Sotomayor, Kagan
- Dissent: Kennedy

Laws applied
- 35 U.S.C. § 271(b)

Global-Tech Appliances, Inc. v. SEB S.A., 563 U.S. 754 (2011), is a United States Supreme Court case. The case considered whether a party, in order to "actively [induce] infringement of a patent" under 35 U.S.C. § 271(b), must know that the induced act constitutes patent infringement, or whether deliberate indifference to the existence of a patent can be considered a form of actual knowledge. In an 8–1 decision delivered by Justice Samuel Alito, the Court held that induced infringement requires knowledge of patent infringement, but because the petitioners had knowledge of a patent infringement lawsuit involving the respondent and Sunbeam Products over the same invention, the Federal Circuit's judgement that petitioners induced infringement must be affirmed under the doctrine of willful blindness.

Justice Anthony Kennedy filed a dissenting opinion.

== Background ==
In the late 1980s, respondent SEB, S.A., a French maker of home appliances, invented an innovative deep fryer, the external surfaces of which remain cool-to-the-touch during operation. The "cool-touch" fryer consisted of a framing that suspends the metal frying pot within the plastic housing, leaving an insulating air space between the heated pot and the exterior. SEB obtained U.S. Patent No. 4,995,312 for this design in 1991 and began manufacturing and selling it under the T-Fal brand. With no similar products in the American market, the fryer became a commercial success. In 1997, Sunbeam Products asked Pentalpha Enterprises, Ltd., a Hong Kong maker of home appliances and wholly owned subsidiary of Global-Tech Appliances, Inc., to design a deep fryer meeting certain specifications that could be sold under the Sunbeam label. To fulfill the request, Pentalpha purchased an SEB fryer in Hong Kong which lacked the U.S. patent notices and copied all but its cosmetic features. Pentalpha then retained an attorney to conduct a right-to-use study for the United States, but neglected to inform the attorney that the design was copied from an SEB fryer. Failing to discover SEB's patent, the attorney issued an opinion letter in August, 1997, stating that Pentalpha's product did not infringe upon any U.S. patents that he had found. That same month, Pentalpha began manufacturing and selling its fryer to Sunbeam, which sold them in the United States.

Sunbeam's fryer, which cost less to manufacture than SEB's, allowed Sunbeam to sell the same invention at a lower cost. Once purchasers of cool-touch deep fryers began selecting Sunbeam's product, SEB sued Sunbeam in March, 1998, alleging patent infringement. Sunbeam notified Pentalpha of the lawsuit the next month, but Pentalpha, undeterred, went on to sell the fryers to Fingerhut Corporation and Montgomery Ward & Co., which each resold the fryers in the United States under their respective labels.

SEB accepted a settlement with Sunbeam and proceeded to sue Pentalpha under two theories. First, SEB claimed that Pentalpha had directly infringed upon its patent in violation of 35 U.S.C. §271(a). Second, SEB claimed that Pentalpha had induced Sunbeam, Fingerhut, and Montgomery Ward to infringe upon the patent, contravening §271(b). The jury found for SEB on both claims and additionally that Pentalpha had willfully infringed upon SEB's patent, awarding SEB $4.65 million. Pentalpha filed post-trial motions on a number of grounds with the District Court for the Southern District of New York. The District Court granted them in part, reducing the jury award to $2.65 million.

Pentalpha appealed to the United States Court of Appeals for the Federal Circuit, which affirmed the District Court's ruling after finding no reversible error in the proceedings. Pentalpha then filed a petition for a writ of certiorari to the Federal Circuit with the Supreme Court on June 23, 2010. The case was argued before the Supreme Court on February 22, 2011, with former Texas Solicitor General Ted Cruz appearing for the French société anonyme.

== Opinion of the Court ==
In an 8–1 decision delivered by Justice Alito, in which Roberts, Scalia, Thomas, Ginsburg, Breyer, Sotomayor, and Kagan joined, the court held:

1. Induced infringement under §271(b) requires knowledge that the induced acts constitute patent infringement.
2. Deliberate indifference to a known risk that a patent exists does not satisfy the knowledge required by §271(b). Nevertheless, the Federal Circuit's judgment must be affirmed because the evidence in this case was plainly sufficient to support a finding of Pentalpha's knowledge under the doctrine of willful blindness.

=== Kennedy's dissent ===
In Kennedy's dissenting opinion, he agreed with the Court that to contravene §271(b), the inducer must know that "the induced acts constitute patent infringement". However, he argued that willful blindness does not suffice for actual knowledge of the infringement, writing that the Court justifies substitution of willful blindness for knowledge in two ways, "neither of which is convincing".
