= List of people executed in the United States in 2011 =

Forty-three people, all male, were executed in the United States in 2011, all by lethal injection. Fifteen of them were in the state of Texas. One (Humberto Leal Garcia) was a foreign national from Mexico, while another (Manuel Valle) was a foreign national from Cuba. Two notable executions were of Troy Davis, and the white supremacist murderer Lawrence Brewer, both carried out on September 21. Delaware would carry out its last involuntary execution with the last overall occurring the following year.

== List of people executed in the United States in 2011 ==
No.	Date of execution	Name	Age of person			Gender	Ethnicity	State	Method	Ref.
No.	Date of execution	Name	At execution	At offense	Age difference	Gender	Ethnicity	State	Method	Ref.
1	January 6, 2011	Billy Don Alverson	39	24	15	Male	Black	Oklahoma	Lethal injection	
2	January 11, 2011	Jeffrey David Matthews	38	21	17	Male	White	Oklahoma	Lethal injection	
3	January 13, 2011	Leroy White	52	29	23	Male	Black	Alabama	Lethal injection	
4	January 25, 2011	Emmanuel Fitzgerald Hammond	45	23	22	Male	Black	Georgia	Lethal injection	
5	February 9, 2011	Martin Link	47	27	20	Male	White	Missouri	Lethal injection	
6	February 15, 2011	Michael Wayne Hall	31	18	13	Male	White	Texas	Lethal injection	
7	February 17, 2011	Frank G. Spisak Jr.	59	31	28	Male	White	Ohio	Lethal injection	
8	February 22, 2011	Timothy Wayne Adams	42	33	9	Male	Black	Texas	Lethal injection	
9	March 10, 2011	Johnnie Roy Baston	37	20	17	Male	Black	Ohio	Lethal injection	
10	March 29, 2011	Eric John King	47	26	21	Male	Black	Arizona	Lethal injection	
11	March 31, 2011	William Glenn Boyd	45	20	25	Male	White	Alabama	Lethal injection	
12	April 12, 2011	Clarence Carter	49	26	23	Male	Black	Ohio	Lethal injection	
13	May 3, 2011	Cary D. Kerr	46	36	10	Male	White	Texas	Lethal injection	
14	May 6, 2011	Jeffrey Brian Motts	36	30	6	Male	White	South Carolina	Lethal injection	
15	May 10, 2011	Benny Joe Stevens	52	40	12	Male	White	Mississippi	Lethal injection	
16	May 17, 2011	Rodney Gray	38	22	16	Male	Black	Mississippi	Lethal injection	
17	May 17, 2011	Daniel Lee Bedford	63	36	27	Male	White	Ohio	Lethal injection	
18	May 19, 2011	Jason Oric Williams	43	23	20	Male	White	Alabama	Lethal injection	
19	May 25, 2011	Donald Edward Beaty	56	29	27	Male	White	Arizona	Lethal injection	
20	June 1, 2011	Gayland Charles Bradford	42	20	22	Male	Black	Texas	Lethal injection	
21	June 16, 2011	Lee Andrew Taylor	32	20	12	Male	White	Texas	Lethal injection	
22	June 16, 2011	Eddie Duvall Powell III	41	25	16	Male	Black	Alabama	Lethal injection	
23	June 21, 2011	Milton Wuzael Mathis	32	19	13	Male	Black	Texas	Lethal injection	
24	June 23, 2011	Roy Willard Blankenship	55	22	33	Male	White	Georgia	Lethal injection	
25	June 30, 2011	Richard Lynn Bible	49	26	23	Male	White	Arizona	Lethal injection	
26	July 7, 2011	Humberto Leal Garcia Jr.	38	21	17	Male	Hispanic	Texas	Lethal injection	
27	July 19, 2011	Thomas Paul West	52	28	24	Male	White	Arizona	Lethal injection	
28	July 20, 2011	Mark Anthony Stroman	41	31	10	Male	White	Texas	Lethal injection	
29	July 21, 2011	Andrew Grant DeYoung	37	19	18	Male	White	Georgia	Lethal injection	
30	July 29, 2011	Robert W. Jackson III	38	18	20	Male	White	Delaware	Lethal injection	
31	August 10, 2011	Martin Robles	33	24	9	Male	Hispanic	Texas	Lethal injection	
32	August 18, 2011	Jerry Terrell Jackson	30	20	10	Male	Black	Virginia	Lethal injection	
33	September 13, 2011	Steven Michael Woods Jr.	31	21	10	Male	White	Texas	Lethal injection	
34	September 21, 2011	Lawrence Russell Brewer	44	31	13	Male	White	Texas	Lethal injection	
35	September 21, 2011	Troy Anthony Davis	42	20	22	Male	Black	Georgia	Lethal injection	
36	September 22, 2011	Derrick O'Neal Mason	37	19	17	Male	Black	Alabama	Lethal injection	
37	September 28, 2011	Manuel Valle	61	27	34	Male	Hispanic	Florida	Lethal injection	
38	October 20, 2011	Christopher Thomas Johnson	38	32	6	Male	White	Alabama	Lethal injection	
39	October 27, 2011	Frank Martinez Garcia	39	28	10	Male	Hispanic	Texas	Lethal injection	
40	November 15, 2011	Reginald Brooks	66	36	29	Male	Black	Ohio	Lethal injection	
41	November 15, 2011	Oba Chandler	65	43	22	Male	White	Florida	Lethal injection	
42	November 16, 2011	Guadalupe Esparza	46	34	12	Male	Hispanic	Texas	Lethal injection	
43	November 18, 2011	Paul Ezra Rhoades	54	30	24	Male	White	Idaho	Lethal injection	
		Average:	44 years	27 years	18 years					

== Demographics ==
Gender
Male	43	100%
Female	0	0%
Ethnicity
White	23	53%
Black	15	35%
Hispanic	5	12%
State
Texas	13	30%
Alabama	6	14%
Ohio	5	12%
Arizona	4	9%
Georgia	4	9%
Florida	2	5%
Mississippi	2	5%
Oklahoma	2	5%
Delaware	1	2%
Idaho	1	2%
Missouri	1	2%
South Carolina	1	2%
Virginia	1	2%
Method
Lethal injection	43	100%
Month
January	4	9%
February	4	9%
March	3	7%
April	1	2%
May	7	16%
June	6	14%
July	5	12%
August	2	5%
September	5	12%
October	2	5%
November	4	9%
December	0	0%
Age
30–39	17	40%
40–49	15	35%
50–59	7	16%
60–69	4	9%
Total	43	100%

== Executions in recent years ==
Number of executions
2012	43
2011	43
2010	46
Total	132

== See also ==
- List of death row inmates in the United States
- List of most recent executions by jurisdiction
- List of people scheduled to be executed in the United States

Preceded by 2010	List of people executed in the United States in 2011	Succeeded by 2012
