= Thompson v. North American Stainless =

Thompson v. N. Am. Stainless
- Supreme Court of the United States

Decided January 24, 2011
- Full case name: Thompson v. North American Stainless
- Citations: 562 U.S. 170 (more)

Holding
- Title VII protects a worker from retaliation if that worker's fiancé files a workplace grievance.

Court membership
- Chief Justice John Roberts Associate Justices Antonin Scalia · Anthony Kennedy; Clarence Thomas · Ruth Bader Ginsburg; Stephen Breyer · Samuel Alito; Sonia Sotomayor · Elena Kagan

Case opinions
- Majority: Scalia, joined by unanimous
- Concurrence: Ginsburg, joined by Breyer
- Kagan took no part in the consideration or decision of the case.

Laws applied
- Title VII of the Civil Rights Act

Thompson v. N. Am. Stainless, 562 U.S. 170 (2011), was a United States Supreme Court case in which the court held that Title VII of the Civil Rights Act protects a worker from retaliation if that worker's fiancé files a workplace grievance.

== Background ==
After Thompson's fiancée, Miriam Regalado, filed a sex-discrimination charge with the Equal Employment Opportunity Commission (EEOC) against their employer, North American Stainless (NAS), NAS fired Thompson. He filed his own charge and a subsequent suit under Title VII of the Civil Rights Act, claiming that NAS fired him to retaliate against Regalado for filing her charge. The federal District Court granted NAS summary judgment on the ground that third-party retaliation claims were not permitted by Title VII, which prohibits discrimination against an employee "because he has made a [Title VII] charge," and which permits, among other things, a "person claiming to be aggrieved... by [an] alleged employment practice" to file a civil action. The en banc Sixth Circuit Court of Appeals affirmed, reasoning that Thompson was not entitled to sue NAS for retaliation because he had not engaged in any activity protected by the statute.

== Opinion of the court ==
The Supreme Court issued an opinion on January 24, 2011. The Supreme Court reversed. In an opinion by Justice Scalia, the court said that Title VII's antiretaliation provision must be construed to cover a broad range of employer conduct. A reasonable worker obviously might be dissuaded from engaging in protected activity if she knew that her fiancé would be fired.
