= 2010 term per curiam opinions of the Supreme Court of the United States =

The Supreme Court of the United States handed down ten per curiam opinions during its 2010 term, which began October 4, 2010 and concluded October 1, 2011.

Because per curiam decisions are issued from the Court as an institution, these opinions all lack the attribution of authorship or joining votes to specific justices. All justices on the Court at the time the decision was handed down are assumed to have participated and concurred unless otherwise noted.

== Court membership ==
Chief Justice: John Roberts

Associate Justices: Antonin Scalia, Anthony Kennedy, Clarence Thomas, Ruth Bader Ginsburg, Stephen Breyer, Samuel Alito, Sonia Sotomayor, Elena Kagan

== Wilson v. Corcoran ==
- Full caption: Bill K. Wilson, Superintendant [sic], Indiana State Prison v. Joseph E. Corcoran
- Citations: 562 U.S. 1; 131 S. Ct. 13
- Prior history: Petition granted sub nom., Corcoran v. Buss, 483 F.Supp.2d 709 (N.D. Ind. 2007); reversed, 551 F.3d 703 (7th Cir. 2008); vacated and remanded, sub nom. Corcoran v. Levenhagen, 558 U.S. 1 (2009) (per curiam); on remand, writ granted, 593 F.3d 547 (7th Cir. 2010); rehearing denied, opinion amended, 7th Cir.
- Full text of the opinion: Wikisource official slip opinion · FindLaw · Justia

562 U.S. 1
Decided November 8, 2010.
Seventh Circuit vacated and remanded.

In 1997, a jury found Joseph Corcoran guilty of murdering four men and he was sentenced to death. The trial court included three factors in its justification of the sentence: the innocence of those killed, the heinousness of the crime, and his potential to commit these crimes in the future. The Indiana Supreme Court vacated this sentence on the basis that these three factors are not admissible in a sentencing decision under Indiana law. In response, the trial court stated that it did not rely on these factors in its sentence, whereupon the Indiana Supreme Court finally affirmed the sentence.

Corcoran filed a petition for a writ of habeas corpus in federal court, which the District Court granted based on one of his claims without discussing the others. The Seventh Circuit reversed and directed the District Court upon remand to deny the writ, without permitting it to review the other claims and without explaining why those claims should not be considered. The Supreme Court vacated that decision in Corcoran v. Levenhagen, 558 U.S. 1 (2009), explaining that it was error for the Seventh Circuit to dispose of the petitioner's other claims without any explanation. On remand, the Seventh Circuit now granted habeas relief to Corcoran, indicating that the state courts should reconsider its sentence in order to comply with state law.

The Supreme Court vacated the Seventh Circuit's ruling. The Court ruled that Federal courts may only grant a writ of habeas corpus if a violation of federal law is found. Federal courts may not grant habeas relief if, instead, the only issue raised is a potential violation of state law.

== Madison County v. Oneida Indian Nation of New York ==
- Full caption: Madison County, New York et al. v. Oneida Indian Nation of New York
- Citations: 562 U.S. 42
- Prior history: On remand following City of Sherrill v. Oneida Indian Nation of N.Y., 544 U.S. 197, 125 S.Ct. 1478, 161 L.Ed.2d 386 (2005); Oneida Indian Nation v. Oneida County, 432 F.Supp.2d 285 (N.D.N.Y.2006); Oneida Indian Nation of N.Y. v. Madison County, 401 F.Supp.2d 219 (N.D.N.Y.2005); affirmed sub nom. Oneida Indian Nation of N.Y. v. Madison County, 605 F.3d 149 (2nd Cir., 2010).
- Full text of the opinion: Wikisource official slip opinion

562 U.S. 42
Decided January 10, 2011.
Second Circuit vacated and remanded.

The case involved the issue of whether tribal sovereign immunity protected the Oneida Indian Nation against foreclosure by local taxing authorities to enforce due property taxes. After the Supreme Court granted certiorari, the tribe passed a tribal declaration and ordinance waiving its immunity against tax enforcement. The Supreme Court then vacated and remanded for the Second Circuit to consider the effect of this new development.

== Swarthout v. Cooke ==
- Full caption: Gary Swarthout, Warden v. Damon Cooke
- Citations: 562 U.S. 216
- Prior history: Petition denied; rev'd, sub nom. Cooke v. Solis, 606 F. 3d 1206 (9th Cir. 2010)
- Full text of the opinion: official slip opinion

562 U.S. 216
Decided January 24, 2011.
Federal habeas relief is not available for an error of state law, and the correct application of a state's "some evidence" standard is not required by the federal Due Process Clause.

Ninth Circuit reversed.

Ginsburg filed a concurrence.

== Felkner v. Jackson ==
- Full caption: T. Felkner v. Steven Frank Jackson
- Citations: 562 U.S. 594
- Prior history: Petition denied, No. 2:07-cv-00555-RJB (E.D. Cal.); rev'd, 389 Fed. Appx. 640 (9th Cir. 2010)
- Laws applied: U.S. Const. amend. XIV
- Full text of the opinion: official slip opinion

562 U.S. 594
Decided March 21, 2011.
Ninth Circuit reversed and remanded.

A California jury convicted Steven Frank Jackson of numerous sexual offenses. Jackson raised a Batson claim, because two of three black prospective jurors had been struck. The prosecutor's race-neutral explanations for the exclusion were accepted by the California Court of Appeal, and the California Supreme Court denied Jackson's petition for review.

Jackson sought federal habeas relief. The Federal District Court found that the state courts' decisions were not unreasonable and denied Jackson's petition, but was reversed by the Court of Appeals for the Ninth Circuit in a three-paragraph memorandum opinion, without discussing any facts or reasoning of the three courts that had rejected Jackson's claim.

The Supreme Court reversed the Ninth Circuit Court's decision, noting that "On federal habeas review, AEDPA 'imposes a highly deferential standard for evaluating state-court rulings' and 'demands that state-court decisions be given the benefit of the doubt.'" Moreover, "The state appellate court’s decision was plainly not unreasonable. There was simply no basis for the Ninth Circuit to reach the opposite conclusion, particularly in such a dismissive manner."

== Bobby v. Mitts ==
- Full caption: David Bobby, Warden v. Harry Mitts
- Citations: 563 U.S. 395
- Prior history: Defendant convicted, sentenced to death, State v. Mitts; aff'd, No. 68612, 1996 WL 732452 (Ohio Ct. App. Dec. 19, 1996); aff'd, 690 N.E.2d 522 (Ohio 1998); postconviction petition denied; aff'd, No. 05-4420, 2000 WL 1433952 (Ohio Ct. App. Sept. 28, 2000); motion to reopen appeal denied, No. 68612, 2002 WL 1335629 (Ohio Ct. App. May 10, 2002); aff'd, 784 N.E.2d 698 (Ohio 2003); habeas petition denied, sub nom. Mitts v. Bagley, No. 03-01131, 2005 WL 2416929 (N.D. Ohio Sept. 29, 2005); rev'd, 620 F. 3d 650 (6th Cir. 2010)
- Full text of the opinion: official slip opinion

563 U.S. 395
Decided May 2, 2011.
This was a AEDPA case about challenged jury instructions given during the penalty phase. In Smith v. Spisak, the court reversed a Court of Appeals decision that had found nearly identical instructions invalid under Mills v. Maryland. Up until Spisak came down, Mitts had also pressed the claim that the instructions were invalid under Mills. After Spisak rejected that claim, the Court of Appeals in this case determined that the instructions were instead contrary Beck v. Alabama and vacated Mitts's death sentence on that basis. In Beck, the Supreme Court held that the death penalty may not be imposed "when the jury was not permitted to consider a verdict of guilt of a lesser included non-capital offense, and when the evidence would have supported such a verdict."

The Supreme Court reversed the Sixth Circuit in this case for two reasons. First, because the concern addressed in Beck was "the risk of an unwarranted conviction," so Beck does not apply to the penalty phase. Second, in AEDPA cases, the standard for reversal is entirely deferential to the state court's decisions unless the state court violated "clearly established" federal law as explicated by the Supreme Court.

Sixth Circuit reversed.

== United States v. Juvenile Male ==
- Full caption: United States v. Juvenile Male
- Citations: 564 U.S. 932
- Prior history: Defendant convicted, D. Mont., 2005; defendant resentenced, D. Mont., July 2007; vacated in part, 590 F. 3d 924 (9th Cir. 2010); question certified, 560 U.S. 558 (2010)
- Full text of the opinion: official slip opinion

564 U.S. 932
Decided June 27, 2011.
Ninth Circuit vacated and remanded.

The Court vacated the Ninth Circuit's judgment, because the case had become moot and the lower court, therefore, lacked constitutional authority under Article III to decide the case on the merits.

Ginsburg, Breyer, and Sotomayor noted without separate opinion that they would remand the case to the Ninth Circuit for that court’s consideration of mootness in the first instance. Kagan did not participate in the consideration or decision of the case.

== Leal Garcia v. Texas ==
- Full caption: Humberto Leal Garcia, AKA Humberto Leal v. Texas
- Citations: 564 U.S. 940
- Full text of the opinion: official slip opinion

564 U.S. 940
Decided July 7, 2011.
Applications for stay of execution and petition for a writ of habeas corpus denied.

The Court denied applications for a stay of execution of Humberto Leal Garcia, a Mexican national who argued that his conviction and death sentence in Texas violated the Vienna Convention on Consular Relations.

Breyer filed a dissent, joined by Ginsburg, Sotomayor, and Kagan.

Leal Garcia was executed on July 7, 2011 as scheduled.

== See also ==
- List of United States Supreme Court cases, volume 562
- List of United States Supreme Court cases, volume 563
- List of United States Supreme Court cases, volume 564
