= Chase Bank USA, N.A. v. McCoy =

- Supreme Court of the United States

Decided January 24, 2011
- Full case name: Chase Bank USA, N.A. v. McCoy
- Citations: 562 U.S. 195 (more)

Holding
- Before August 2009, Regulation Z did not require banks to provide credit-card holders with a change-in-terms notice before raising their interest rate after a delinquency or default.

Court membership
- Chief Justice John Roberts Associate Justices Antonin Scalia · Anthony Kennedy; Clarence Thomas · Ruth Bader Ginsburg; Stephen Breyer · Samuel Alito; Sonia Sotomayor · Elena Kagan

Case opinion
- Majority: Sotomayor, joined by unanimous

Chase Bank USA, N.A. v. McCoy, 562 U.S. 195 (2011), was a United States Supreme Court case in which the court held that, before August 2009, Regulation Z did not require banks to provide credit-card holders with a change-in-terms notice before raising their interest rate after a delinquency or default.

== Background ==
Regulation Z—promulgated by the Federal Reserve Board (Board) pursuant to its authority under the Truth in Lending Act—requires credit-card issuers to disclose certain information to cardholders. The version of the regulation in effect at the time this dispute arose obliged issuers to provide to cardholders an "[i]nitial disclosure statement," specifying "each periodic rate that may be used to compute the finance charge". It also imposed "[s]ubsequent disclosure requirements," including notice to cardholders "[w]henever any term required to be disclosed under §226.6 [was] changed". When "a periodic rate or other finance charge [was] increased because of the consumer's delinquency or default," notice needed to be given "before the effective date of the change."

At the time McCoy filed suit, he was the holder of a credit card issued by Chase Bank. The cardholder agreement provided that McCoy was eligible for "preferred rates" as long as he met certain conditions. If any of those conditions were not met, Chase reserved the right to raise the rate, up to a pre-set maximum, and to apply the change to both existing and new balances. McCoy alleged that Chase increased his interest rate due to his delinquency or default and applied that increase retroactively, and that this action violated Regulation Z because Chase did not notify him of the increase until after it had taken effect. The federal District Court dismissed his complaint, holding that because the increase did not constitute a "change in terms", Chase was not required to notify him of the increase before implementing it. The Ninth Circuit Court of Appeals reversed that portion of the decision, holding that Regulation Z required issuers to provide notice of an interest-rate increase prior to its effective date.

== Opinion of the court ==
The Supreme Court issued an opinion on January 24, 2011.
