= United States v. Tinklenberg =

- Supreme Court of the United States

Decided May 26, 2011
- Full case name: United States v. Tinklenberg
- Citations: 563 U.S. 647 (more)

Holding
- Under the Speedy Trial Act, the speedy trial clock stops whenever a pretrial motion is filed, regardless of whether the trial process is actually delayed by the motion or expected to be delayed.

Court membership
- Chief Justice John Roberts Associate Justices Antonin Scalia · Anthony Kennedy; Clarence Thomas · Ruth Bader Ginsburg; Stephen Breyer · Samuel Alito; Sonia Sotomayor · Elena Kagan

Case opinions
- Majority: Breyer, joined by Kennedy, Ginsburg, Alito, Sotomayor; Roberts, Scalia, Thomas (Parts I, III)
- Concurrence: Scalia (in part), joined by Roberts, Thomas
- Kagan took no part in the consideration or decision of the case.

Laws applied
- Speedy Trial Act of 1974

United States v. Tinklenberg, 563 U.S. 647 (2011), was a United States Supreme Court case in which the court held that, under the Speedy Trial Act of 1974, the speedy trial clock stops whenever a pretrial motion is filed, regardless of whether the trial process is actually delayed by the motion or expected to be delayed.

== Background ==
The Speedy Trial Act of 1974 (Act) provides, among other things, that in "any case in which a plea of not guilty is entered, the trial... shall commence within seventy days" after the arraignment, 18 U.S.C. §3161(c)(1), but lists a number of exclusions from the 70-day period. One of these is "delay resulting from any pretrial motion, from the filing of the motion through the conclusion of the hearing on, or other prompt disposition of, such motion," §3161(h)(1)(D).

Tinklenberg's trial on federal drug and gun charges began 287 days after his arraignment. The federal District Court denied his motion to dismiss the indictment on the ground that the trial violated the Act's 70-day requirement, finding that 218 of the days fell within various of the Act's exclusions, leaving 69 nonexcludable days, thus making the trial timely. On Tinklenberg's appeal from his conviction, the Sixth Circuit Court of Appeals agreed that many of the 287 days were excludable, but concluded that 9 days during which three pretrial motions were pending were not, because the motions did not actually cause a delay, or the expectation of delay, of trial. Since these 9 days were sufficient to bring the number of nonexcludable days above 70, the court found a violation of the Act. And given that Tinklenberg had already served his prison sentence, it ordered the indictment dismissed with prejudice.

== Opinion of the court ==
The Supreme Court issued an opinion on May 26, 2011.
