= Sossamon v. Texas =

- Supreme Court of the United States

Argued 2 November, 2010 Decided 20 April, 2011
- Full case name: Harvey Leroy Sossamon, III, petitioner v. Texas et al.
- Docket no.: 08-1438
- Citations: 563 U.S. 277 (more)
- Argument: Oral argument
- Opinion announcement: Opinion announcement

Holding
- State officials cannot be sued in their official capacity for monetary damages under the Religious Land Use and Institutionalized Persons Act.

Court membership
- Chief Justice John Roberts Associate Justices Antonin Scalia · Anthony Kennedy; Clarence Thomas · Ruth Bader Ginsburg; Stephen Breyer · Samuel Alito; Sonia Sotomayor · Elena Kagan

Case opinions
- Majority: Thomas, joined by Roberts, Scalia, Kennedy, Ginsburg, Alito
- Dissent: Sotomayor, joined by Breyer
- Kagan took no part in the consideration or decision of the case.

Sossamon v. Texas, 563 U.S. 277 (2011), was a United States Supreme Court case on the Free Exercise Clause of the First Amendment, the Religious Land Use and Institutionalized Persons Act (RLUIPA), and sovereign immunity. The majority decision, written by Justice Clarence Thomas, held that the petitioner could not sue Texas state officials in their official capacity for damages under the RLUIPA, affirming a lower court ruling. The majority reasoned that the officials could not be sued under the RLUIPA because it was passed under the United States Congress’s Spending Power.

== Background ==
The petitioner, Harvey Leroy Sossamon, III, was an inmate at the maximum security French M. Robertson Unit. In 2006, he sued the state of Texas and prison officials, in both their individual and official capacities, under the Religious Land Use and Institutionalized Persons Act (RLUIPA). Sossamon alleged that they were breaking the act by preventing him and other inmates from attending religious services if under disciplinary restrictions and disallowing use of the prison's chapel for religious worship under its policies.

=== Lower courts ===
The Texas federal district court dismissed his claim for monetary damages, and Sossamon appealed. When the case reached the Fifth Circuit, it ruled that Sossamon could not sue the officials in an individual capacity under the act because its authorization for "appropriate relief" was not specific enough to override the official's sovereign immunity.
