= Frank Spisak =

American serial killer (1951–2011)

Frank G. Spisak Jr.
- Spisak, dressed as Adolf Hitler, testifying during his murder trial in 1983
- Born: June 6, 1951; Cleveland, Ohio, U.S.
- Died: February 17, 2011 (aged 59); Southern Ohio Correctional Facility, Ohio, U.S.
- Political party: American Nazi Party
- Status: Executed by lethal injection
- Motive: Neo-Nazism; Desire to start a race war
- Convictions: Aggravated murder (3 counts); Attempted murder Aggravated robbery (2 counts)
- Penalty: Death

Details
- Span of crimes: February 1 – August 30, 1982
- Country: United States
- State: Ohio
- Killed: 3
- Injured: 1

Frank G. Spisak Jr. (June 6, 1951 – February 17, 2011) was an American neo-Nazi serial killer and lone wolf terrorist who killed three people and attacked two from February to August 1982. Two of his victims were black, while one was white, Spisak having thought he was Jewish. He was a member of the neo-Nazi National Socialist White People's Party. In 1983, he was convicted of the murders and sentenced to death.

While in prison, he was in contact with neo-Nazi James Mason and was lionized by his newsletter SIEGE. He appealed his sentence repeatedly, with the United States Supreme Court finally ruling against him in 2010 in the decision Smith v. Spisak. Spisak was executed by lethal injection in 2011 after over 27 years spent on death row, a record for Ohio.

== Early life ==
Frank G. Spisak Jr. was born in Cleveland, Ohio, on June 6, 1951. His father was a factory worker, and moved their family to Middleburg Heights in Spisak's youth to avoid the increased black population resulting from migration. Spisak was known in high school as awkward, a member of the chess club, who was known to draw swastikas. He enrolled at Cleveland State University, but was unable to afford the tuition, and dropped out the following year.

== Neo-Nazism ==
He was a member of the National Socialist White People's Party (NSWPP, previously the American Nazi Party). In 1970, he met fellow neo-Nazi James Mason at the party's bookstore in Cleveland in addition to party meetings at their headquarters in Arlington, Virginia. According to a neo-Nazi paper, Spisak was in 1975 criticized by the White Confederacy neo-Nazi group for claiming to still be an officer in an organization from which he was actually expelled.

At 22, he married a woman named Laverne and had a daughter, with Spisak working menially at a factory. His wife found his Nazism "off-putting", with Spisak often reading about Hitler in his spare time. Three years into their marriage, Spisak sustained a head injury in a car accident, which according to his wife resulted in increasingly bizarre behavior. He decided to undergo gender transition, undergoing hormone replacement therapy and planned to get sexual reassignment surgery, calling himself Frankie Ann. During this time he had sex with men, which led his wife to leave him, taking most of the couple's belongings.

Spisak then changed his mind about his gender transition, and became more obsessed with Hitler. He collected swords, Nazi memorabilia, framed pictures of Hitler, and stockpiled ammunition and guns. During the same time he dated a black female sex worker.

== Murders ==
He shot and murdered three people in lone wolf terrorist attacks in 1982, on the campus of Cleveland State University. Two of his victims were black, 57-year-old Horace Rickerson and 17-year-old Brian Worford, and one white, 50-year-old Timothy Sheehan, whom Spisak thought was Jewish. The crime was committed in an effort to initiate a race war.

His first victim was Reverend Horace Rickerson, whom he shot on February 1, 1982, in the bathroom of the campus. Spisak had been reading a book on Hitler at Cleveland State library, before going into the bathroom and happening upon Rickerson. He shot Rickerson repeatedly with a pistol, before leaving the scene. He returned to see the crowd that had gathered upon the scene, encountering his later victim Timothy Sheehan, the campus's maintenance man. He later recounted that he had felt "pretty good" about the killing, and said it made him feel as if he had "accomplished something". He befriended Ron Reddish, a fellow neo-Nazi who would become his accomplice; together they would search the streets for black males to target.

In June, they attacked another black man at a café, John Hardaway. Hardaway was shot five times, but survived. Some months following that incident, Spisak returned to the CSU campus and shot at a woman in the campus's chemistry lab, but missed. A crowd formed to catch him, but he escaped, and a reward was offered for information on him. Paranoid, Spisak recalled his meeting with Sheehan, and began to follow him; on August 27, he shot and killed him in the campus bathroom, also stealing his wallet. The next night he killed again, targeting 17-year old Brian Worford, who was waiting at a bus stop outside of the university's campus.

== Legal proceedings ==
Spisak was finally arrested a week later, after he got drunk and shot his gun inside of his home; however, they did not initially realize he was the murderer they were looking for, so he was released on bond. Spisak had bragged about the killings to both his girlfriend and ex-wife, and an anonymous tip was sent in over his involvement. After initially trying to flee to Reddish's home, he was brought into custody.

During his 1983 trial he grew a toothbrush moustache in the style of Adolf Hitler, repeatedly gave Sieg Heil salutes, and carried Hitler's book Mein Kampf. His defense attorney tried to portray him as insane by putting him on the stand, where he would talk about God and Hitler. A doctor testified that Spisak had a personality disorder, but was not insane. Spisak was convicted of the murders and was sentenced to death. After the verdict, he yelled "Heil Hitler" as he left the courtroom. He repeatedly appealed his sentence. Spisak's attorneys argued that he was too mentally ill to be executed, saying he had bipolar disorder. Spisak himself later said the shootings were caused by his hatred and his mental illness, which he blamed on a sexual identity struggle. His appeals went up to the United States Supreme Court in the decision Smith v. Spisak, where his appeal was ruled against in 2010.

While in prison, the SIEGE newsletter operated by James Mason published letters from him after Spisak sent him a letter, where he stated his crimes gave him "great satisfaction". Mason had an initial dislike of him due to his sexual and gender identity history, but changed his mind. In March 1984 the newsletter covered and endorsed him often, at one point printing his prison mail address so he could be contacted by supporters; Mason lionized him as one of the NSWPP murderers. Mason's Universal Order also printed his writings. According to writer Spencer Sunshine, Spisak was "one of the handful of murderers that Mason praised who could legitimately be considered neo-Nazis".

== Execution ==
On February 17, 2011, Spisak was executed via lethal injection at the Southern Ohio Correctional Facility near Lucasville, Ohio, at the age of 59. He was the longest serving death row inmate in the state of Ohio at over 27 years. Spisak's last meal consisted of spaghetti with tomato sauce, a salad, chocolate cake, and coffee.

Sheehan's family said of his execution that: "Today we chose to celebrate the life of husband and father, Timothy Sheehan, not the death of Frank Spisak ... We are grateful that the justice system has worked, and appreciate those in the criminal justice system whose diligent efforts have helped bring this matter to a final resolution."

== See also ==
- List of people executed in Ohio
- List of people executed in the United States in 2011
- List of serial killers in the United States
- List of white defendants executed for killing a black victim
