= Kasten v. Saint-Gobain Performance Plastics Corp. =

- Supreme Court of the United States

Decided March 22, 2011
- Full case name: Kasten v. Saint-Gobain Performance Plastics Corp.
- Citations: 563 U.S. 1 (more)

Holding
- The Fair Labor Standards Act prohibits retaliation against workers for complaints related to violations of the act without regard to whether the complaints are oral or written.

Court membership
- Chief Justice John Roberts Associate Justices Antonin Scalia · Anthony Kennedy; Clarence Thomas · Ruth Bader Ginsburg; Stephen Breyer · Samuel Alito; Sonia Sotomayor · Elena Kagan
- Kagan took no part in the consideration or decision of the case.

Laws applied
- Fair Labor Standards Act of 1938

Kasten v. Saint-Gobain Performance Plastics Corp., 563 U.S. 1 (2011), was a United States Supreme Court case in which the court held that the Fair Labor Standards Act of 1938 prohibits retaliation against workers for complaints related to violations of the act without regard to whether the complaints are oral or written.

== Background ==
Kasten brought an anti-retaliation suit against his former employer, Saint-Gobain, under the Fair Labor Standards Act of 1938, which provides minimum wage, maximum hour, and overtime pay rules; and which forbids employers "to discharge... any employee because such employee has filed any complaint" alleging a violation of the act, under 29 U. S. C. §215(a)(3). In a related suit, the federal District Court found that Saint-Gobain violated the act by placing timeclocks in a location that prevented workers from receiving credit for the time they spent donning and doffing work-related protective gear. In this suit, Kasten claimed that he was discharged because he orally complained to company officials about the timeclocks. The District Court granted Saint-Gobain summary judgment, concluding that the Act's anti-retaliation provision did not cover oral complaints. The Seventh Circuit Court of Appeals affirmed.

== Opinion of the court ==
The Supreme Court issued an opinion on March 22, 2011. The court reversed including oral complaints within the statute's reference to "any complaint".
