= Cullen v. Pinholster =

- Supreme Court of the United States

Argued November 9, 2010 Decided April 4, 2011
- Full case name: Vincent Cullen, Acting Warden v. Scott Lynn Pinholster
- Docket no.: 09-1088
- Citations: 563 U.S. 170 (more)
- Argument: Oral argument

Case history
- Prior: Pinholster v. Ayers, 590 F. 3d 651 (9th Cir. 2009)

Holding
- Review under 28 U.S.C. § 2254(d)(1) is limited to the record that was before the state court that adjudicated the claim on the merits.

Court membership
- Chief Justice John Roberts Associate Justices Antonin Scalia · Anthony Kennedy; Clarence Thomas · Ruth Bader Ginsburg; Stephen Breyer · Samuel Alito; Sonia Sotomayor · Elena Kagan

Case opinions
- Majority: Thomas, joined by Roberts, Scalia, Kennedy; Alito (all but part II); Breyer (parts I and II); Ginsburg, Kagan (part II)
- Concurrence: Alito (in part and in judgment)
- Concur/dissent: Breyer
- Dissent: Sotomayor, joined by Ginsburg, Kagan (part II)

Laws applied
- Antiterrorism and Effective Death Penalty Act

Cullen v. Pinholster, 563 U.S. 170, is a 2011 United States Supreme Court case concerning evidentiary development in federal habeas corpus proceedings. Oral arguments in the case took place on November 9, 2010, and the Supreme Court issued its decision on April 4, 2011. The Supreme Court held 5–4 that only evidence originally presented before the state court in which the claim was originally adjudicated on the merits could be presented when raising a claim under 28 U.S.C. § 2254(d)(1), and that evidence from a federal habeas court could not be presented in such proceedings. It also held that convicted murderer Scott Pinholster, the respondent in the case, was not entitled to the habeas relief he had been granted by the United States Court of Appeals for the Ninth Circuit.

== Background ==
Scott Lynn Pinholster was convicted of two counts of first-degree murder in connection with the fatal stabbing of Thomas Johnson and Robert Beckett in the Tarzana neighborhood of Los Angeles, California, on January 9, 1982. In 1992, the California Supreme Court unanimously affirmed his conviction and sentence. Pinholster filed a state habeas petition in 1993, which the California Supreme Court also unanimously denied.

In November 1997, Pinholster again petitioned for a writ of habeas corpus, this time in the United States District Court for the Central District of California. This petition alleged that Pinholster had received ineffective assistance of counsel at the penalty phase of his trial, claiming that his lawyers during that trial had failed to adequately investigate and present mitigating evidence of his mental disorders. Pinholster also moved for an evidentiary hearing, which the District Court granted. After the hearing concluded, the District Court granted Pinholster habeas relief, but a three-judge panel of the United States Court of Appeals for the Ninth Circuit subsequently reversed this decision.

The entire Ninth Circuit then reheard the case en banc, vacated the three-judge panel's opinion, and affirmed the District Court's decision to grant habeas relief. This decision was based on evidence presented to the District Court, and concluded that the California Supreme Court had unreasonably applied Strickland v. Washington when it decided to deny Pinholster habeas relief. Consequently, the en banc Ninth Circuit concluded that the California Supreme Court's decision to deny Pinholster such relief previously was "contrary to, or involved an unreasonable application of, clearly established Federal law" as per 28 U.S.C. § 2254(d)(1). The Supreme Court granted certiorari in the case on June 14, 2010.

== Supreme Court ==
On April 4, 2011, the Supreme Court issued a 5–4 opinion reversing the Ninth Circuit's decision to grant habeas relief. It also reinstated Pinholster's death sentence.

=== Opinion of the Court ===
The Court held that only evidence from the state court record could be considered by the federal district court when deciding whether to grant habeas relief under 28 U.S.C. § 2254(d)(1) for a federal claim that has been adjudicated on the merits in state court. A narrow reading of the holding would be limited to cases where the petitioner has had a full and fair opportunity to develop their claim in state proceedings.

The Strickland v. Washington standard for ineffective assistance of counsel was already deferential, requiring the defendant to rebut a "strong presumption" that attorneys have "made all significant decisions in the exercise of reasonable professional judgment" and show that the sentencing outcome was prejudiced. After AEDPA, ineffective assistance of counsel claims receive "double deference" where the district court is required to deny relief if they find that the state court decision was a reasonable application of the Strickland standard under § 2254(d)(1) .

The new evidence Pinholster wanted to present about substance abuse, criminal history and mental illness of his family members may have been considered aggravating if a jury found that it showed future dangerousness. Circuit courts have been reluctant to find that counsel was ineffective for failing to present so-called "double-edged" evidence.

The Court found that counsel was not deficient, and even if counsel had been deficient by not presenting the additional mitigation evidence, the sentencing outcome was not prejudiced because the aggravating factors - including Pinholster boasting about his white supremacist ideology and criminal history during the trial - weighed heavily. The majority says Strickland permits a strategic decision to not investigate mitigation evidence that would not persuade a jury. Counsel in Wiggins, they point out, conceded that his strategy did not meet the practice standards for capital cases in Maryland.

=== Alito's concurrence ===
Justice Alito concurred with the judgment and joined the majority opinion except as to Part II. Alito wrote separately about the majority's conclusion in Part II of the majority opinion. He argued that §2254(d)(1) review should not be limited to the state record when new evidence is admitted in a properly held §2254(e)(2) evidentiary hearing. In Pinholster's case Justice Alito would have held that the federal hearing was barred by §2254(e)(2) because the mitigating evidence could have been presented during the state court proceedings.

=== Breyer's concurrence ===
Justice Breyer said "there is no role in (d) analysis for a habeas petitioner to introduce evidence that was not first presented to the state courts" but a petitioner can still obtain relief if the state court decision "fails (d)'s test" by violating §2254(d)(2).

Some defendants (and lower courts) have attempted to avoid the Pinholster bar on evidentiary hearings by applying Justice Breyer's concurring reasoning.

=== Dissent ===
Part I of Justice Sotomayor's dissent made similar points to Justice Alito's concurrence:

The majority's interpretation of § 2254(d)(1) thus suggests the anomalous result that petitioners with new claims based on newly obtained evidence can obtain federal habeas relief if they can show cause and prejudice for their default but petitioners with newly obtained evidence supporting a claim adjudicated on the merits in state court cannot obtain federal habeas relief if they cannot first satisfy § 2254(d)(1) without the new evidence.

In Footnote 10 the majority says that some new evidence may give rise to a new claim that would not be considered "adjudicated on the merits" for §2254(d) purposes:

Though we do not decide where to draw the line between new claims and claims adjudicated on the merits, Justice Sotomayor’s hypothetical involving new evidence of withheld exculpatory witness statements may well present a new claim.

Justice Sotomayor says "[d]etermining whether a state court could have denied a petitioner relief in light of newly discovered evidence is not so different than determining whether there is any reasonable basis for a state court's unreasoned decision" as required by Harrington v. Richter.

Ruth Bader Ginsburg and Elena Kagan joined the dissent only in Part II.

=== Vote breakdown ===
The majority opinion was written by Clarence Thomas and joined by Chief Justice John Roberts as well as Antonin Scalia, Anthony Kennedy, and (with the exception of part II) Samuel Alito. Justice Stephen Breyer joined only parts I and II of the majority opinion, and also filed his own opinion concurring in part and dissenting in part.

== Subsequent developments ==
The Supreme Court's decision in Pinholster prevented federal courts from considering new evidence when evaluating claims previously adjudicated in state court. This created a problem for some defendants whose state court proceedings lacked an adequately developed factual record, as they could no longer turn to federal courts to supplement that record. A 2015 article by Jennifer Utrecht, an attorney for the Department of Justice, criticized Pinholster for preventing federal courts from considering evidence outside of the state court record, given that some state court habeas defendants receive ineffective assistance of counsel, and thus do not sufficiently develop the evidentiary record in state court.
