= List of United States Supreme Court cases, volume 562 =

This is a list of all the United States Supreme Court cases from volume 562 of the United States Reports:

Case name	Citation	Date decided
Wilson v. Corcoran	562 U.S. 1	November 8, 2010
Federal courts may only grant a writ of habeas corpus if a violation of federal law is found. Federal courts may not grant habeas relief if, instead, the only issue raised is a potential violation of state law.
Abbott v. United States	562 U.S. 8	November 15, 2010
18 U.S.C. § 924(c), which required a minimum five-year prison sentence, was to be imposed in addition to any other mandatory sentence given for another crime, including the underlying drug-related or violent offense.
Los Angeles County v. Humphries	562 U.S. 29	November 30, 2010
Where a city is being sued under Section 1983 of the Civil Rights Act of 1871, if it violates someone's rights because of "policy or custom," it is liable regardless of whether the "policy or custom" was established by city ordinance or state law.
Costco Wholesale Corp. v. Omega S.A.	562 U.S. 40	December 13, 2010
Affirmed by an equally-divided court. Kagan recused herself because she was the Solicitor General before the case reached the court.
Madison Cnty. v. Oneida Indian Nation	562 U.S. 42	January 13, 2011
Vacated and remanded for the Second Circuit to consider the effect of the tribe's waiver of its immunity against tax enforcement after the case had been granted certiorari.
Mayo Foundation v. United States	562 U.S. 44	January 11, 2011
The Treasury Department's regulation providing that student employees working at least full-time are categorically ineligible for the student exemption from Social Security taxes is a reasonable construction of that statute.
Ransom v. FIA Card Services, N.A.	562 U.S. 61	January 11, 2011
A debtor in bankruptcy is only allowed to shield from creditors an amount for a car payment if they are actually purchasing or leasing the vehicle, and not if they already own it.
Harrington v. Richter	562 U.S. 86	January 19, 2011
AEDPA's standard for federal habeas relief applies even when a state court does not issue an opinion explaining the basis of its decision.
Premo v. Moore	562 U.S. 115	January 19, 2011
Applying AEDPA, the state-court decision was not an unreasonable application of either part of the rule from Strickland v. Washington.
NASA v. Nelson	562 U.S. 134	January 19, 2011
NASA's background checks of contract employees do not violate any constitutional privacy right.
Thompson v. N. Am. Stainless	562 U.S. 170	January 24, 2011
Title VII protects a worker from retaliation if that worker's fiancé files a workplace grievance.
Ortiz v. Jordan	562 U.S. 180	January 24, 2011
A party may not appeal a denial of summary judgment after a district court has conducted a full trial on the merits.
Chase Bank USA, N.A. v. McCoy	562 U.S. 195	January 24, 2011
Before August 2009, Regulation Z did not require banks to provide credit-card holders with a change-in-terms notice before raising their interest rate after a delinquency or default.
Swarthout v. Cooke	562 U.S. 216	January 24, 2011
Federal habeas relief is not available for an error of state law, and the correct application of a state's "some evidence" standard is not required by the federal Due Process Clause.
Bruesewitz v. Wyeth	562 U.S. 223	February 22, 2011
The 1986 Vaccine Act preempts all vaccine design defect claims against vaccine manufacturers.
CSX Transp., Inc. v. Ala. Dept. of Revenue	562 U.S. 277	February 22, 2011
The Railroad Revitalization and Regulatory Reform Act of 1976 permits a railroad to challenge a state's sales and use taxes as discriminatory when the tax exempts the railroad's competitors, such as water and motor carriers.
Walker v. Martin	562 U.S. 307	February 23, 2011
A state's rule requiring state habeas petitions to be filed "as promptly as the circumstances allow" constitutes an independent state ground that is adequate to bar habeas relief in federal court.
Williamson v. Mazda Motor of Am., Inc.	562 U.S. 323	February 23, 2011
FMVSS 208 does not preempt state tort suits claiming that manufacturers should have installed lap-and-shoulder belts, instead of lap belts, on rear inner seats.
Michigan v. Bryant	562 U.S. 344	February 28, 2011
Dying murder victim identification and description of the shooter and of the location of the shooting were not testimonial statements, because they had a "primary purpose... to enable police assistance to meet an ongoing emergency". Their admission at trial did not violate the defendant rights under the Confrontation Clause.
FCC v. AT&T	562 U.S. 397	March 1, 2011
Corporations do not have "personal privacy" for the purposes of Freedom of Information Act Exemption 7(C).
Staub v. Proctor Hosp.	562 U.S. 411	March 1, 2011
An employer may be held liable for employment discrimination based on the discriminatory animus of an employee who influenced, but did not make the ultimate employment decision.
Henderson v. Shinseki	562 U.S. 428	March 13, 2011
The deadline for filing a notice of appeal with the United States Court of Appeals for Veterans Claims does not have jurisdictional consequences.
Snyder v. Phelps	562 U.S. 443	March 2, 2011
Speech on a matter of public concern, in a public place, cannot be the basis of liability for a tort of emotional distress.
Pepper v. United States	562 U.S. 476	March 2, 2011
Original District Court decisions relating to sentencing the defendant were compatible with federal sentencing guidelines, as judges may consider a defendant's rehabilitation during the resentencing process.
Skinner v. Switzer	562 U.S. 521	March 7, 2011
Because federal-court subject-matter jurisdiction existed over Skinner’s complaint, his claim was cognizable under §1983.
Wall v. Kholi	562 U.S. 545	March 7, 2011
It is proper to toll the time available for a habeas petition upon a properly filed application for state post-conviction or other collateral review with respect to the pertinent judgment or claim.
Milner v. Dept. of Navy	562 U.S. 562	March 7, 2011
FOIA's Exemption 2 only allows the government to withhold records relating to employee relations and human resources issues.
Felkner v. Jackson	562 U.S. 594	March 21, 2011
On federal habeas review, AEDPA imposes a highly deferential standard for evaluating state-court rulings and demands that state-court decisions be given the benefit of the doubt.
