= CIGNA Corp. v. Amara =

- Supreme Court of the United States

Decided May 16, 2011
- Full case name: CIGNA Corp. v. Amara
- Citations: 563 U.S. 421 (more)

Holding
- The district court did not have authority under Section 502(a)(1)(B) of ERISA to reform CIGNA's pension plan, but Section 502(a)(3) did give the court that authority.

Court membership
- Chief Justice John Roberts Associate Justices Antonin Scalia · Anthony Kennedy; Clarence Thomas · Ruth Bader Ginsburg; Stephen Breyer · Samuel Alito; Sonia Sotomayor · Elena Kagan

Case opinions
- Majority: Breyer, joined by Roberts, Kennedy, Ginsburg, Alito, Kagan
- Concurrence: Scalia (in judgment), joined by Thomas
- Sotomayor took no part in the consideration or decision of the case.

Laws applied
- Employee Retirement Income Security Act of 1974

CIGNA Corp. v. Amara, 563 U.S. 421 (2011), was a United States Supreme Court case in which the court held that the federal district court did not have authority under Section 502(a)(1)(B) of ERISA to reform CIGNA's pension plan, but Section 502(a)(3) did give the court that authority.

== Background ==
Until 1998, CIGNA Corporation's pension plan provided a retiring employee with an annuity based on preretirement salary and length of service. Its new plan replaced that annuity with a cash balance based on a defined annual contribution from CIGNA, increased by compound interest. The new plan translated already-earned benefits under the old plan into an opening amount in the cash balance account. Respondents, on behalf of beneficiaries of the CIGNA Pension Plan (also a petitioner), challenged the new plan's adoption, claiming, as relevant here, that CIGNA's notice of the changes was improper, particularly because the new plan in certain respects provided them with less generous benefits. The District Court found that CIGNA's disclosures violated its obligations under §§102(a), 104(b), and 204(h) of the Employee Retirement Income Security Act of 1974 (ERISA). In determining relief, it found that CIGNA's notice defects had caused the employees "likely harm." It then reformed the new plan and ordered CIGNA to pay benefits accordingly, finding its authority in ERISA §502(a)(1)(B), which authorizes a plan "participant or beneficiary" to bring a "civil action" to "recover benefits due... under the terms of his plan." The Second Circuit Court of Appeals affirmed.

== Opinion of the court ==
The Supreme Court issued an opinion on May 16, 2011.
