= Humberto Leal Garcia =

Mexican murderer and rapist

Humberto Leal García Jr.
- Born: January 16, 1973; Monterrey, Nuevo León, Mexico
- Died: July 7, 2011 (aged 38); Huntsville Unit, Texas, U.S.
- Status: Executed by lethal injection
- Conviction: Capital murder
- Penalty: Death (July 11, 1995)

Humberto Leal García Jr. (January 16, 1973 – July 7, 2011) was a Mexican national who was sentenced to death in the US state of Texas for the May 21, 1994, rape, torture, and murder of a 16-year-old girl in San Antonio. Despite calls from U.S. President Barack Obama, the US State Department, and Mexico to Texas for a last-minute reprieve, Leal was executed as scheduled on July 7, 2011.

== Early life and crime ==
Leal, a mechanic, was born in Monterrey, Nuevo León, Mexico, and moved to the United States when he was two years old. He suffered from brain damage and was reportedly sexually abused by a priest as a child. He was an illegal immigrant to the United States.

On May 21, 1994, Leal kidnapped, raped, and murdered 16-year-old Adria Sauceda. The girl had been at a party and became intoxicated, and a group of men gang raped her. Leal is said to have offered to drive her home, and the two struggled when Sauceda tried to get out of the car away from the party.

Official court documents state, "There was a 30- to 40-pound asphalt rock roughly twice the size of the victim's skull lying partially on the victim's left arm; blood was underneath this rock. A smaller rock with blood on it was located near the victim's right thigh." There was also an object 15 inches (380 mm) in length extending out of her vagina, with a screw at the end. Leal claimed that she fell and hit her head. No one was charged in the gang rape.

At the sentencing phase of his murder trial, the jury was informed that two weeks before the murder, Leal raped another teenage girl and bit her on the neck. Afterwards, Leal had repeatedly called the girl's older sister and threatened to have someone murder her if she testified against him.

== Case and trial ==
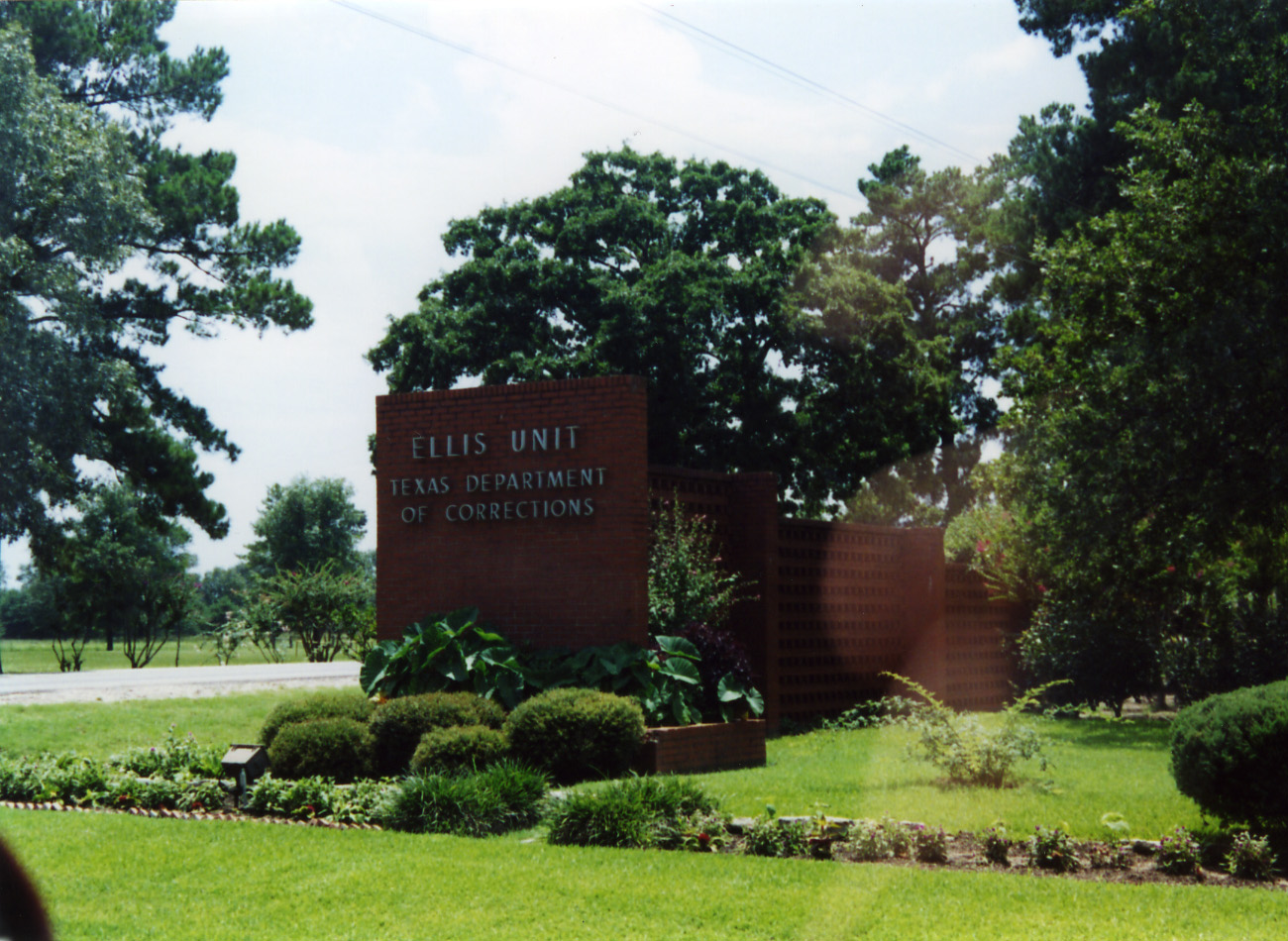
Ellis Unit, where Leal was originally held

Leal was never informed that as a Mexican national, he was entitled to assistance from the Mexican consul. However, at the time of his arrest, he did not reveal his Mexican citizenship, and the issue of consular access was not raised during the trial. Critics of the decision to execute him said that he incriminated himself, which a better lawyer might have advised him not to do, and that he had other legal difficulties, including the court-appointed lawyer's failure to challenge questionable evidence. The jury convicted him after 45 minutes of deliberation. Texas maintained that he confessed before his arrest, so a change of legal counsel or strategy would have made no difference.

The laws on capital punishment in Texas do not allow the death penalty for murder alone if the victim is over five, so prosecutors had to prove, for Leal to be sentenced to death, not only that he had killed Adria Sauceda, but also that the murder was committed in the course of another felony offense, in this case, rape and kidnapping. Leal's lawyers criticized the lack of DNA evidence supporting the sexual assault charges.

Defenders of Leal stated that the original case relied partly on controversial and flawed methods such as bite-mark analysis and the use of luminol to detect blood.

While on death row, he was originally held at the Ellis Unit. From 1999 to 2000, the state death row for men was moved to the Polunsky Unit (formerly the Terrell Unit). He had the Texas Department of Criminal Justice Death Row ID# 999162.

== Legal controversy ==
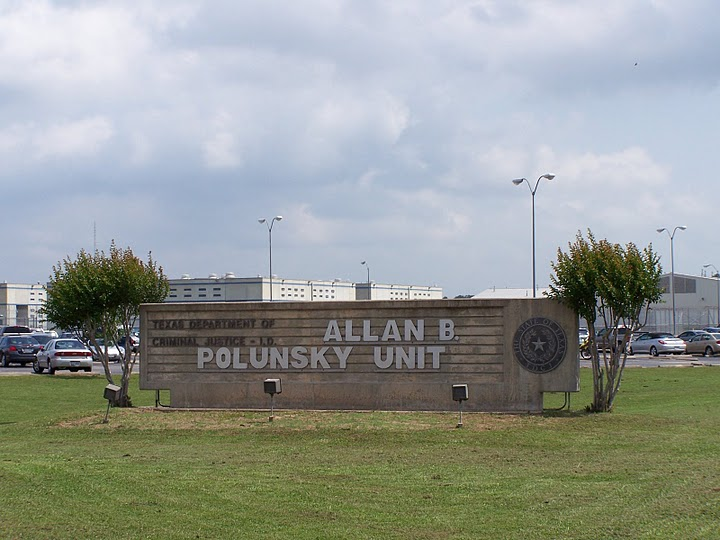
The Polunsky Unit, where he was later held

The failure to inform Leal of his rights created legal controversy. In 1998, he appealed his death sentence on the grounds that police had not informed him that he could call the Mexican consulate. The Texas Court of Criminal Appeals had already upheld the sentence in February of that year, but international law had not been considered in the ruling.

A 2004 ruling by the International Court of Justice (in Avena and Other Mexican Nationals (Mexico v. United States of America)) found that about 50 other Mexican nationals condemned to execution in the United States and he had been denied their right under the Vienna Convention to be told that they may contact their consular officials. A 2008 Supreme Court decision declared the international court's decision binding on the Federal Government, but said that Congress must pass a law obliging states to comply.

As the date scheduled for Leal's execution approached, the Obama administration made a number of comments concerning the execution, saying that it would cause "irreparable harm" to US interests abroad, including the demonstration of "respect for the international rule of law," and "have serious repercussions for United States foreign relations, law-enforcement and other co-operation with Mexico, and the ability of American citizens traveling abroad to have the benefits of consular assistance in the event of detention."

=== Supreme Court case ===
The administration submitted a 30-page brief to the Supreme Court asking them to stay Leal's execution while Congress considered legislation relating to the right of foreign nationals on death row to contact their consulate for legal aid. On July 7, 2011, the court ruled 5–4 that Congress had had adequate time to do so, and wrote in an unsigned majority opinion that it would not "prohibit a state from carrying out a lawful judgment in light of unenacted legislation."

Justice Stephen G. Breyer, a noted opponent of capital punishment, in his dissent, which the other three dissenting justices joined, wrote that the execution would damage American foreign-policy interests and that the court should defer to the executive branch's traditional prerogative with regard to foreign relations.

== Execution and reactions ==
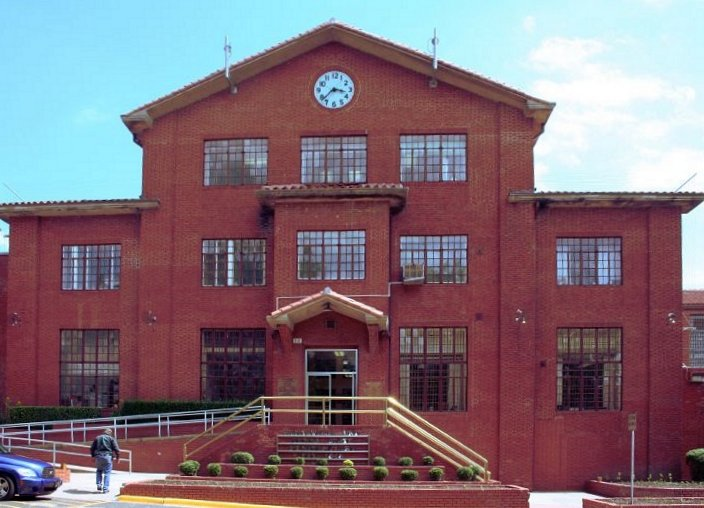
Huntsville Unit, where Leal was executed

After 16 years of appeals, Leal was executed by lethal injection at 6:21 p.m. CST on July 7, 2011. He admitted responsibility for the crime and said he was sorry, and his final words included "Viva México". Leal's last meal consisted of fried chicken, pico de gallo, and tacos guisados.

On July 8, a spokeswoman for Texas Governor Rick Perry stated, "If you commit the most heinous of crimes in Texas, you can expect to face the ultimate penalty under our laws." Arturo Sarukhan, Mexico's ambassador to the United States, said that "the government of Mexico has never called into question the heinous nature of the crimes attributed to Mr. Leal and in no way condones violent crime," but condemned the execution; Sarukhan had earlier tried to contact Perry, who would not take his call.

Euna Lee, an American journalist who was arrested in North Korea in 2009, criticized the United States' failure to comply with the Vienna Convention, saying that she believed "prompt consular access" protected her from physical mistreatment while a prisoner, and that the decision in the Leal case would encourage foreign governments to violate the rights of American citizens abroad.

Navi Pillay, the United Nations High Commissioner for Human Rights, said that Leal's execution undermined "the role of the International Court of Justice, and its ramifications [were] likely to spread far beyond Texas."

== See also ==
- José Medellín
- List of people executed in Texas, 2010–2019
- List of people executed in the United States in 2011

Executions carried out in Texas
Preceded by Milton Wuzael Mathis June 21, 2011	Humberto Leal Garcia Jr. July 7, 2011	Succeeded by Mark Anthony Stroman July 20, 2011
Executions carried out in the United States
Preceded by Richard Lynn Bible – Arizona June 30, 2011	Humberto Leal Garcia Jr. – Texas; July 7, 2011	Succeeded by Thomas Paul West – Arizona July 19, 2011
