= Mayo Foundation for Medical Education & Research v. United States =

Mayo Foundation for Medical Education and Research, et al. v. United States
- Supreme Court of the United States

Argued November 8, 2010 Decided January 11, 2011
- Full case name: Mayo Foundation for Medical Education and Research; Mayo Clinic; and Regents of the University of Minnesota v. United States
- Docket no.: 09-837
- Citations: 562 U.S. 44 (more) 131 S. Ct. 704; 178 L. Ed. 2d 588; 2011 WL 66433

Case history
- Prior: Judgment for plaintiffs, Mayo Foundation for Medical Education and Research v. United States, 503 F. Supp. 2d 1164 (D. Minn. 2007), Regents of the University of Minnesota v. United States, 2008 WL 906799 (D. Minn. 2008); both reversed, 568 F.3d 675 (8th Cir. 2009); cert. granted, 560 U.S. ___ (2010).

Holding
- The Treasury Department's regulation providing that student employees working at least full-time are categorically ineligible for the student exemption from Social Security taxes is a reasonable construction of that statute.

Court membership
- Chief Justice John Roberts Associate Justices Antonin Scalia · Anthony Kennedy; Clarence Thomas · Ruth Bader Ginsburg; Stephen Breyer · Samuel Alito; Sonia Sotomayor · Elena Kagan

Case opinion
- Majority: Roberts, joined by Scalia, Kennedy, Thomas, Ginsburg, Breyer, Alito, Sotomayor
- Kagan took no part in the consideration or decision of the case.

Laws applied
- 26 U.S.C. § §3121(b)(10) (Federal Insurance Contributions Act); 26 C.F.R §31.3121(b)(10)– 2(d)(3)(iii)

Mayo Foundation v. United States, 562 U.S. 44 (2011), is a United States Supreme Court case in which the Court upheld a Treasury Department regulation on the grounds that the courts should defer to government agencies in tax cases in absence of an unreasonable decision on the part of the agency.

Under the Federal Insurance Contributions Act (FICA), students and their educational employers are exempted from paying Social Security taxes. The Treasury Department issued a regulation in 2004, declaring those who worked more than 40 hours a week were ineligible for such an exemption. The Mayo Foundation filed suit to challenge the regulation and for a refund of the taxes it had paid on its medical residents—recently graduated physicians, who work more than full-time providing patient care but who are still considered trainees by the medical profession. The District Court ruled for the Mayo Foundation and struck the regulation, but was reversed by the Court of Appeals.

The Supreme Court ruled unanimously to uphold the regulation as within the Treasury Department's statutory authority to issue and as a reasonable construction of FICA. The Court clarified that the deferential standard of Chevron U.S.A., Inc. v. Natural Resources Defense Council, Inc. (1984) applied, notwithstanding prior Court rulings that had adopted a more stringent standard to tax regulations. Applying Chevron, the Court first found that Congress had left the matter to the agency, because the statute was silent on the definition of "student" and on its applicability to medical residents specifically. Second, the Court found, that the regulation was a reasonable interpretation of the statute, and that its clear line helped distinguish workers who study and students who work, simplified enforcement and furthered the broad coverage of Social Security.

== Background ==
In the first decade of the 21st century the vast majority of medical residents in the United States were physicians, who had recently graduated from a medical school in the United States. While graduating from a medical school provides an individual with a medical degree, a state medical license is required to practice medicine. All states require, that an individual pass Step 3 of the USMLE or COMLEX exams and complete at least one year of residency training to obtain an unrestricted medical license. In practice, this requires most practicing physicians to complete a multiyear residency first. While training, residents practice medicine with considerable autonomy under the supervision of attending physicians.

Medical residencies traditionally require lengthy hours of their trainees. Residents in the past had literally resided in hospitals for the duration of their training. By 2010, when the case was argued before the Supreme Court, regulations from the Accreditation Council for Graduate Medical Education and the American Osteopathic Association had limited work hours to about 80 hours per week, and a first-year resident at the Mayo Clinic made $47,259 plus benefits.

In 1935, the United States Congress passed the Federal Insurance Contributions Act (FICA), which imposed a payroll tax on workers. The revenues of the tax were meant to be used to finance Social Security. An amendment to the Act, passed four years later, provided that a "service performed in the employ of... a school, college, or university... if such service is performed by a student enrolled in and regularly attending classes at such school, college, or university" would be exempt. First-year residents, or interns, were also specifically exempted. In 1965, Congress repealed the intern exemption but left the student exemption in place.

Until the 1990s, the Act and its application to medical residents were not an issue. Many hospitals assessed and paid FICA taxes on behalf of their employees. The University of Minnesota's hospitals did not, however, and in the early 1990s, the Social Security Administration sued to recover a small portion of those taxes. An initial administrative review ruled for the Social Security Administration, but the district court reversed. The Eighth Circuit affirmed the district court's decision after granting a de novo review, and the University recovered $40 million. A number of other residency programs quickly filed lawsuits, attempting to recoup the taxes they had paid. After some of those programs were successful in other circuit courts, the Treasury agreed to repay the taxes it had collected. However, it also promulgated a new regulation to take effect in April 2005, which stated that any full-time employee, including nearly all medical residents, were ineligible to receive the student exemption, (Note: "§31.3121(b)(10)– 2(d)(3)(iii)" (PDF). C.F.R. "The services of a full-time employee are not incident to and for the purpose of pursuing a course of study. The determination of whether an employee is a full-time employee is based on the employer's standards and practices, except regardless of the employer's classification of the employee, an employee whose normal work schedule is 40 hours or more per week is considered a full-time employee. An employee's normal work schedule is not affected by increases in hours worked caused by work demands unforeseen at the start of an academic term. However, whether an employee is a full-time employee is reevaluated for the remainder of the academic term, if the employee changes employment positions with the employer. An employee's work schedule during academic breaks is not considered in determining whether the employee's normal work schedule is 40 hours or more per week. The determination of an employee's normal work schedule is not affected by the fact that the services performed by the employee may have an educational, instructional, or training aspect." The relevant section of the Treasury's regulation states:) clearly stating that it was doing so to "overturn court rulings that had upheld the view that residents remained students".

== Lower court proceedings and arguments before the Supreme Court ==
The Mayo Clinic and the University of Minnesota sued in federal court to overturn those regulations. The district courts agreed with them, but upon appeal, the Eighth Circuit consolidated the two cases into one and reversed the judgments, remanding the cases for entry of judgments in favor of the United States. This decision was at odds with decisions from the Second, Sixth, Seventh, and Eleventh Circuits, which had all previously ruled that residents may count as students for the purpose of FICA taxes. The Eighth Circuit's ruling created a circuit split, and on appeal, the Supreme Court agreed to hear the case.

Mayo and Minnesota, supported by amicus briefs from a number of residency programs and medical organizations, argued that a residency is primarily educational in nature. They asserted that a residency is generally chosen based on academic criteria and that a residency must be completed in order for a physician to be licensed to practice medicine. They also argued that residency training involves not only supervised work, but also an educational curriculum, conferences, and lectures, much like clinical years of medical school. Mayo's attorney, former Bush Administration Solicitor General Theodore Olson, also argued that the rule was "arbitrary", as the tax would apply to a resident working 40 hours per week but not to a resident working only 39 hours per week. The medical schools proposed that the IRS should base their determination on the primary purpose of a program—providing an education versus providing a livelihood.

In response, Assistant to the Solicitor General Matthew D. Roberts argued on behalf of the United States that patient care and not educational curricula occupies the vast majority of residents' time. He also argued that although the 1939 FICA Amendment had originally specifically exempted interns, residents who had not yet obtained their unrestricted medical license, that exemption was removed in 1965 to allow doctors to begin paying into Social Security earlier, so that they could be eligible for certain benefits.

During oral arguments, Chief Justice John Roberts noted that the case was a "very familiar situation of an apprentice who is both an employee and a student," and that the only way that one could draw a line between the two "is to have somebody say: This is going to be the line." He was of the opinion that, if anyone should draw the line, the Internal Revenue Service should be the one. Associate Justice Sonia Sotomayor, on the other hand, felt that residents were employees, as evidenced by her statement "You don't think receiving $50,000 or $60,000 a year is enough to make you an employee of someone?" According to The Wall Street Journal, Associate Justice Samuel Alito appeared to be more favorable to the medical schools, asking the Justice Department's lawyer at one point "in general, why do medical students become residents? Are they enrolled in the program to make money...or do they want additional education?"

== Opinion of the Court ==
In a decision written by Chief Justice Roberts, the Supreme Court unanimously upheld the Eighth Circuit's decision. Associate Justice Elena Kagan recused herself from participating in the case, as she had signed the government's brief during her tenure as Solicitor General of the United States. Declining to review using a standard set out in National Muffler Dealers Assn., Inc. v. United States (1979), the Court instead used a standard set out in Chevron U.S.A., Inc. v. Natural Resources Defense Council, Inc. (1984). Chevron, a landmark case regarding deference to government agencies, instituted a two-part test: The job of the reviewing court is to first establish whether Congress has unambiguously spoken about the matter. If so, the court is to follow Congress' intent. If not, it is the job of the court to determine whether the agency's statutory interpretation was a reasonable one. National Muffler, on the other hand, requires that reviewing courts take into account "whether the regulation harmonizes with the plain language of the statute, its origin, and its purpose" and states that courts may examine a statutory interpretation made years after the passage of the original act on the merits. (Note: National Muffler indicated that the proper standard for judicial review should be the following: "In determining whether a particular regulation carries out the congressional mandate in a proper manner, we look to see whether the regulation harmonizes with the plain language of the statute, its origin, and its purpose. A regulation may have particular force if it is a substantially contemporaneous construction of the statute by those presumed to have been aware of congressional intent. If the regulation dates from a later period, the manner in which it evolved merits inquiry. Other relevant considerations are the length of time the regulation has been in effect, the reliance placed on it, the consistency of the Commissioner's interpretation, and the degree of scrutiny Congress has devoted to the regulation during subsequent re-enactments of the statute." McMahon, Martin J. Jr.; Shepard, Ira B.; Simmons, Daniel L. (2011). "Recent Developments in Federal Income Taxation: The Year 2010". Florida Tax Review. 10: 565.) The Mayo Foundation had requested that the Court rule according to the National Muffler standard, while the United States argued that the Court should use the Chevron standard, arguing that National Muffler had been superseded. The Court had in fact cited both cases in opinions since 1984, but agreed with the Government's position, stating that it would not be wise to "carve out an approach to administrative review good for tax law only".

Despite the Mayo Foundation's arguments otherwise, the Court ruled that "student" was a sufficiently ambiguous term to state that Congress has specifically addressed the issue. The Court also noted that Congress in the past had specifically singled out medical residents when making exemptions available, which in the Court's eyes made the Mayo Foundation's arguments about unambiguity unreasonable. Therefore, according to Chevron, the role of the courts should solely be to determine whether the Treasury Department made a reasonable decision—and the Court concluded that the Treasury did just that. In writing for the Court, Roberts stated that "The [Treasury] department certainly did not act irrationally in concluding that these doctors – 'who work long hours, serve as high [sic] skilled professionals, and typically share some or all of the terms of employment of career employees' – are the kind of workers that Congress intended to both contribute and benefit from the Social Security system".

== Impact ==
The Mayo Clinic noted that it had been paying the taxes while the case was pending in the courts, so the 15-page opinion would not force them to pay back taxes. In March 2010, while the case was pending before the Supreme Court, the Treasury announced that it would not contest refund claims for taxes paid prior to the April 2005 regulation. It would however assess taxes on salaries paid after that date, which would cost residency programs a total of approximately $700 million annually, or $3,100 a year for a resident earning $50,000 a year (and equivalent amount for the resident's employer).

An article in the New England Journal of Medicine noted that "[r]esidents could find additional support in the Court's unambiguous holding for efforts to enforce other workplace rights, such as unemployment benefits (e.g., after hospital closure) or protection under the Family Medical Leave Act."

The Supreme Court's decision to use Chevron as its test for reviewing the Treasury Department's decision for marked a departure from previous practice; the Court had the courts have previously given less deference to the Internal Revenue Service's statutory interpretations. (Note: According to an article in The Federal Circuit Bar Journal, the Court's application of the National Muffler standard to "tax regulations promulgated under IRC § 7805(a)" in the years following Chevron "created confusion among the lower courts". The Mayo Foundation decision settled the matter. Wagner, Derek (2011). "Who's the (Son of) BOSS?: The Struggle Between the Federal Circuit and Treasury to Define "Omits from Gross Income" in Son of BOSS Tax Shelters and Other Overstatement-of-Basis Tax Cases". The Federal Circuit Bar Journal. 21: 45., partially citing Berg, Michael E. (2008). "Judicial Deference to Tax Regulations: A Reconsideration in Light of National Cable, Swallows Holding, and Other Developments". Tax Law. 61: 481, 498.) According to an article in the Florida Tax Review, the Court in doing so "unambiguously overruled" its previous decision in the National Muffler in favor of Chevron, finding that an agency should have leeway in interpreting the statute in question, no matter when or how long ago the statute was placed in effect, how consistent the agency was in interpreting the statute, the importance of the statute or how closely Congress has looked into the agency's decision. However, an article in the George Washington Law Review which advocates for the use of the National Muffler standard in reviewing retroactive tax regulations (IRC § 7805(b)) states that National Muffler may not have been entirely overruled, arguing that the Court implied that Chevron test is only to be used in "complex questions of statutory interpretation" and that the Court left open the possibility that a future scenario may warrant the use of the National Muffler test instead of the Chevron test.

The Court also overruled Rowan Cos. v. United States (1981), and United States v. Vogel Fertilizer Co. (1982), stating that the Chevron test does not depend on whether Congress intended to delegate out general authority over a matter or just specific authority.
