= Astra USA, Inc. v. Santa Clara County =

- Supreme Court of the United States

Decided March 29, 2011
- Full case name: Astra USA, Inc. v. Santa Clara County
- Citations: 563 U.S. 110 (more)

Holding
- Medical providers, as third-party beneficiaries, may not sue drug manufacturers for selling drugs at prices higher than the discounted price required by Medicaid.

Court membership
- Chief Justice John Roberts Associate Justices Antonin Scalia · Anthony Kennedy; Clarence Thomas · Ruth Bader Ginsburg; Stephen Breyer · Samuel Alito; Sonia Sotomayor · Elena Kagan

Case opinion
- Majority: Ginsburg, joined by unanimous
- Kagan took no part in the consideration or decision of the case.

Astra USA, Inc. v. Santa Clara County, 563 U.S. 110 (2011), was a United States Supreme Court case in which the court held that medical providers, as third-party beneficiaries, may not sue drug manufacturers for selling drugs at prices higher than the discounted price required by Medicaid.
