= Henderson v. Shinseki =

- Supreme Court of the United States

Decided March 1, 2011
- Full case name: Henderson v. Shinseki
- Citations: 562 U.S. 428 (more)

Holding
- The deadline for filing a notice of appeal with the United States Court of Appeals for Veterans Claims does not have jurisdictional consequences.

Court membership
- Chief Justice John Roberts Associate Justices Antonin Scalia · Anthony Kennedy; Clarence Thomas · Ruth Bader Ginsburg; Stephen Breyer · Samuel Alito; Sonia Sotomayor · Elena Kagan

Case opinion
- Majority: Alito, joined by unanimous

Henderson v. Shinseki, 562 U.S. 428 (2011), was a United States Supreme Court case in which the Court held that the deadline for filing a notice of appeal with the United States Court of Appeals for Veterans Claims does not have jurisdictional consequences.
