= Schindler Elevator Corp. v. United States ex rel. Kirk =

- Supreme Court of the United States

Decided May 16, 2011
- Full case name: Schindler Elevator Corp. v. United States ex rel. Kirk
- Citations: 563 U.S. 401 (more)

Holding
- A federal agency's written response to a FOIA request for records constitutes a "report" within the meaning of the FCA's public disclosure bar.

Court membership
- Chief Justice John Roberts Associate Justices Antonin Scalia · Anthony Kennedy; Clarence Thomas · Ruth Bader Ginsburg; Stephen Breyer · Samuel Alito; Sonia Sotomayor · Elena Kagan

Case opinions
- Majority: Thomas, joined by Roberts, Scalia, Kennedy, Alito
- Dissent: Ginsberg, joined by Breyer, Sotomayor
- Kagan took no part in the consideration or decision of the case.

Laws applied
- False Claims Act

Schindler Elevator Corp. v. United States ex rel. Kirk, 563 U.S. 401 (2011), was a United States Supreme Court case in which the court held that a federal agency's written response to a Freedom of Information Act request for records constitutes a "report" within the meaning of the False Claims Act's public disclosure bar.

== Background ==
The public disclosure bar of the False Claims Act (FCA) generally forecloses private parties from bringing qui tam suits to recover falsely or fraudulently obtained federal payments where those suits are "based upon the public disclosure of allegations or transactions in a criminal, civil, or administrative hearing, in a congressional, administrative, or Government Accounting Office report, hearing, audit, or investigation, or from the news media." Kirk brought such a suit, alleging that his former employer, Schindler Elevator Corp., had submitted hundreds of false claims for payment under its federal contracts. To support his allegations, Kirk pointed to information his wife received from the United States Department of Labor (DOL) in response to three requests for records she filed under the Freedom of Information Act (FOIA). Granting Schindler's motion to dismiss, the federal District Court concluded, among other things, that the FCA's public disclosure bar deprived it of jurisdiction over Kirk's allegations that were based on information disclosed in a government "report" or "investigation." The Second Circuit Court of Appeals vacated and remanded, holding, in effect, that an agency's response to a FOIA request is neither a "report" nor an "investigation."

== Opinion of the court ==
The Supreme Court issued an opinion on May 16, 2011.

== See also ==
- Graham County Soil & Water Conservation District v. United States ex rel. Wilson (2010)
