= McNeill v. United States =

- Supreme Court of the United States

Argued April 25, 2011 Decided June 6, 2011
- Full case name: Clifton Terelle McNeill, Petitioner v. United States
- Docket no.: 10-5258
- Citations: 563 U.S. 816 (more) 131 S. Ct. 2218; 180 L. Ed. 2d 35
- Argument: Oral argument
- Opinion announcement: Opinion announcement

Holding
- When determining whether an offense under State law is a serious drug offense, federal sentencing courts must consult the maximum term of imprisonment for the offense at the time of conviction.

Court membership
- Chief Justice John Roberts Associate Justices Antonin Scalia · Anthony Kennedy; Clarence Thomas · Ruth Bader Ginsburg; Stephen Breyer · Samuel Alito; Sonia Sotomayor · Elena Kagan

Case opinion
- Majority: Thomas, joined by unanimous

McNeill v. United States, 563 U.S. 816 (2011), was a decision by the Supreme Court of the United States holding that, regarding whether an offense under State law is a serious drug offense for purposes of federal sentencing, courts must consult the maximum term of imprisonment for the offense at the time of conviction.

== Background ==
The plaintiff, Clifton Terelle McNeil, was sentenced to 300 months in jail after being convicted of unlawful possession of a firearm. He was also sentenced to an additional 240 months in prison for unlawful possession with intent to distribute crack cocaine. A US District court determined McNeil was an "armed career criminal" and therefore sought the highest sentence possible for his crimes. McNeil argued that he was not eligible for maximum sentencing because his drug related charges were not "serious drug offenses under the ACCA."

== Question before the Court ==
Can the federal Armed Career Criminal Act be used in conduction with a state law for the purposes of a longer sentence?

== Decision of the Supreme Court ==
In a unanimous decision in favor of the United States, Justice Thomas wrote the opinion for the Court. Thomas noted that, "A federal sentencing court must determine whether 'an offense under State law' is a 'serious drug offense' by consulting the 'maximum term of imprisonment' applicable to a defendant's prior state drug offense at the time of the defendant's conviction for that offense."

== See also ==
- List of United States Supreme Court cases, volume 563
