= Connick v. Thompson =

- Supreme Court of the United States

Argued October 6, 2010 Decided March 29, 2011
- Full case name: Connick, District Attorney, et al. v. Thompson
- Docket no.: 09-571
- Citations: 563 U.S. 51 (more) 131 S. Ct. 1350; 179 L. Ed. 2d 417; 2011 U.S. LEXIS 2594

Case history
- Prior: Jury verdict affirmed in part, reversed in part, Thompson v. Connick, 553 F.3d 836 (5th Cir. 2008); on rehearing en banc, 578 F.3d 293 (5th Cir. 2009); cert. granted, 559 U.S. 1004 (2010).
- Subsequent: Remanded, Thompson v. Connick, 641 F.3d 133 (5th Cir. 2011).

Holding
- A district attorney's office cannot be held responsible under Section 1983 for failing to properly train its employees when the plaintiff can only prove a single violation of Brady v. Maryland.

Court membership
- Chief Justice John Roberts Associate Justices Antonin Scalia · Anthony Kennedy; Clarence Thomas · Ruth Bader Ginsburg; Stephen Breyer · Samuel Alito; Sonia Sotomayor · Elena Kagan

Case opinions
- Majority: Thomas, joined by Roberts, Scalia, Kennedy, Alito
- Concurrence: Scalia, joined by Alito
- Dissent: Ginsburg, joined by Breyer, Sotomayor, Kagan

Laws applied
- Section 1983; Brady v. Maryland

Connick v. Thompson, 563 U.S. 51 (2011), is a United States Supreme Court case in which the Court considered whether a prosecutor's office can be held liable for a single Brady violation by one of its members on the theory that the office provided inadequate training.

The case centered on the standards for holding a municipal government or a prosecutor's office liable for the constitutional violations of its employees. The case arose after John Thompson spent eighteen years in prison, including fourteen on death row, for a murder he did not commit. It was eventually discovered that prosecutors in the Orleans Parish District Attorney’s Office had suppressed a blood test report that could have exonerated him, a clear violation of the Brady v. Maryland rule which requires the prosecution to turn over exculpatory evidence to the defense.

After his release, Thompson sued Harry Connick Sr. in his official capacity as District Attorney, alleging that the office had failed to adequately train its prosecutors on their Brady obligations. A jury originally awarded Thompson $14 million in damages, and the Fifth Circuit Court of Appeals affirmed that decision.

The Supreme Court, however, reversed the award in a 5-4 decision. Justice Clarence Thomas, writing for the majority, held that a district attorney’s office cannot be held liable under Section 1983 for a failure to train based on a single Brady violation. The Court ruled that to establish "deliberate indifference" for municipal liability, a plaintiff must typically show a pattern of similar constitutional violations.

== Background ==
In 1984, John Thompson, a 22-year-old African American father of two, was charged along with another man for killing a prominent New Orleans businessman. After his picture was published in the newspaper because of the arrest, victims of an unsolved attempted armed robbery identified Thompson as the person involved.

Handling both cases, the district attorney of the Parish of Orleans, Harry Connick Sr., chose to first bring to trial the armed robbery charge against Thompson in hopes that a conviction would help with the murder case. Based solely on the identification by the three victims, Thompson was found guilty of attempted armed robbery and sentenced to 50 years in prison. Then during the murder trial, Thompson was effectively precluded from testifying in his own defense because the prosecution would have impeached his testimony by referring to his armed robbery conviction. His codefendant was able to testify that he saw Thompson commit the murder without rebuttal testimony from Thompson. Thompson was convicted of the murder and sentenced to death. However, the trial attorneys in Connick's office suppressed a critical blood sample test. Elisa Abolafia, a private investigator, discovered that the blood splatter on the victim from the robbery did not match the blood type of Thompson. This meant that Thompson was wrongfully convicted of the robbery; a conviction that prohibited him from defending himself vigorously in the murder case. Connick also suppressed evidence in the murder trial, failing to disclose to Thompson's legal team the existence of an eyewitness description that matched one of the prosecution's witnesses, Kevin Freeman, and audio of witness Richard Perkins which implied Perkins had come forward for a cash reward and had used Freeman as his source.

In 2001, Thompson's sentence was commuted to life in prison. In 2002, his conviction was and he was retried with his defense providing evidence that Freeman had committed the murder.

After nearly two decades of wrongfully being imprisoned, Thompson was found not guilty in the retrial. Thompson eventually sued Connick and several of his assistant district attorneys for suppression of evidence and won a verdict of $14 million.

== Opinion of the court ==
On March 29, 2011, the United States Supreme Court, in a 5–4 decision written by Justice Clarence Thomas, overturned the $14 million award by the lower court, with the decision split along ideological lines. The majority found for the appellant, Harry Connick Sr., holding that the prosecutor's office is not liable under §1983, saying that "the only issue before [the Court] is whether Connick, as the policy maker for the district attorney's office, was deliberately indifferent to the need to train the attorneys under his authority" to which Justice Thomas said the answer to that question was no, given an absence of proof concerning a pattern of misconduct.

Justice Ruth Bader Ginsburg dissented, arguing that the recurring and systemic nature of the Brady violations in that specific office demonstrated a total breakdown in professional supervision that justified the jury's original verdict. The ruling significantly raised the bar for plaintiffs seeking to hold local governments accountable for the misconduct of individual officials.

The foundation of this area of law is Monell v. Department of Social Services (1978). Before Monell, municipalities were generally immune from these types of lawsuits. This case established that local governments could be sued under Section 1983, but only if the constitutional violation was caused by an official policy or custom. The Court was very clear that a city is not liable just because it employs someone who did something wrong; there must be a direct link between a government policy and the injury.

Building on that foundation, City of Canton v. Harris (1989) introduced the concept of failure to train as a form of official policy. In Canton, the Court ruled that a municipality’s decision not to train its employees can be considered a policy if that failure amounts to deliberate indifference to the rights of the public. The Court even hypothesized a narrow exception where a single incident might be enough to show liability. They used the example of a city arming police officers with guns and sending them out to arrest fleeing felons without any training on the constitutional limits of using deadly force. In such a high-stakes, predictable situation, the need for training is so obvious that failing to provide it constitutes deliberate indifference even without a prior history of shootings.

In Connick v. Thompson, the Supreme Court specifically used these precedents to limit when that single-incident theory can apply. The majority held that while the Canton hypothetical made sense for police officers with no legal background, it did not apply to prosecutors. They reasoned that because prosecutors have already graduated from law school, passed the bar exam, and are bound by professional ethical codes, the need for additional in-house training on something like Brady material is not so obvious that a single violation proves deliberate indifference. They also looked to Board of Commissioners of Bryan County v. Brown (1997), which emphasized that a pattern of similar violations is ordinarily necessary to put a municipality on notice that its training is deficient. Because Thompson could not show a consistent pattern of his specific type of blood-test suppression in that office, the Court concluded the District Attorney could not have been "deliberately indifferent" under the law.

== Criticism ==
The New York Times opined that "Justice Ginsburg's dissent is the more persuasive...", and the Los Angeles Times wrote that "[t]he court got this one wrong." Nina Totenberg wrote that "a bitterly divided U.S. Supreme Court all but closed the door" to prosecutors being held liable for damages when prosecutors violate the law to deprive a person of a fair trial. Dahlia Lithwick wrote "Both Thomas and Scalia have produced what can only be described as a master class in human apathy. Their disregard for the facts of Thompson's thrashed life and near-death emerges as a moral flat line...only by willfully ignoring that entire trial record can [Scalia] and Thomas reduce the entire constitutional question to a single misdeed by a single bad actor." Radley Balko noted that "...[t]here's something pretty unsavory about a judicial philosophy that cites a ruling that we now know sent an innocent man back to prison as an authority to deny compensation to another innocent man who was nearly executed because the government hid the evidence that would have and eventually did exonerate him." Kieran Healy called the tone of the majority opinion "spiteful", and the decision a "Lord Denning Moment" for the court. Healy continued, "[t]he conservative majority preferred to affirm an obvious wrong rather than face the appalling vista of a brutal and corrupt justice system." Andrew Cohen called the majority's argument a "warped rationale." Wendy Kaminer wrote that "...what's striking about this case, aside from the majority's apparent indifference to practical realities and the actual sufferings of an innocent man wrongfully sentenced to die, is its indifference to the facts of the case outlined by Justice Ginsburg's dissent." Bennett Gershman and Joel Cohen called the majority's reasoning "bizarre," and wrote that "[Ginsburg's] dissent was so contemptuous of the majority's decision that it provoked a gratuitous concurring opinion from Justice Scalia in a likely effort to seek to legitimize the majority opinion from her savage rebuke." Writing for the American Constitution Society, Brandon Garrett called the ruling "chilling" and the majority's arguments "formalistic and circular."
