= Fox v. Vice =

- Supreme Court of the United States

Argued March 22, 2011 Decided June 6, 2011
- Full case name: Ricky D. Fox, Petitioner v. Judy Ann Vice, as Executrix of the Estate of Billy Ray Vice, et al.
- Docket no.: 10-114
- Citations: 563 U.S. 826 (more) 131 S. Ct. 2205; 180 L. Ed. 2d 45
- Argument: Oral argument
- Opinion announcement: Opinion announcement

Holding
- Reasonable fees may be granted to the defendant in a suit that involves both frivolous and non-frivolous claims, but only for costs resulting from the frivolous claims.

Court membership
- Chief Justice John Roberts Associate Justices Antonin Scalia · Anthony Kennedy; Clarence Thomas · Ruth Bader Ginsburg; Stephen Breyer · Samuel Alito; Sonia Sotomayor · Elena Kagan

Case opinion
- Majority: Kagan, joined by unanimous

Fox v. Vice, 563 U.S. 826 (2011), was a United States Supreme Court case in which the Court held that reasonable fees may be granted to the defendant in a suit that involves both frivolous and non-frivolous claims, but only for costs resulting from the frivolous claims.
