= Kentucky v. King =

- Supreme Court of the United States

Argued January 12, 2011 Decided May 16, 2011
- Full case name: Kentucky v. King
- Docket no.: 09-1272
- Citations: 563 U.S. 452 (more) 131 S. Ct. 1849; 179 L. Ed. 2d 865

Case history
- Prior: Defendant convicted (Fayette Co. Cir. Ct.); affirmed, unpublished (Ky. App.); reversed, 302 S.W.3d 649 (Ky. 2010).

Holding
- Warrantless searches conducted in exigent circumstances do not violate the Fourth Amendment as long as the police did not create the exigency by violating or threatening to violate the Fourth Amendment.

Court membership
- Chief Justice John Roberts Associate Justices Antonin Scalia · Anthony Kennedy; Clarence Thomas · Ruth Bader Ginsburg; Stephen Breyer · Samuel Alito; Sonia Sotomayor · Elena Kagan

Case opinions
- Majority: Alito, joined by Roberts, Scalia, Kennedy, Thomas, Breyer, Sotomayor, Kagan
- Dissent: Ginsburg

Laws applied
- Fourth Amendment

Kentucky v. King, 563 U.S. 452 (2011), was a decision by the US Supreme Court, which held that warrantless searches conducted in police-created exigent circumstances do not violate the Fourth Amendment as long as the police did not create the exigency by violating or threatening to violate the Fourth Amendment.

== Legal background ==
The Fourth Amendment requires searches and seizures be reasonable. The Court has held a search or seizure without a warrant presumptively unreasonable. However, there are many exceptions to the warrant requirement, including exigent circumstances, search incident to arrest, consent search, plain view, automobile exception, and border search exception.

Kentucky v. King involves the exigent circumstances exception to the warrant requirement. The Court has identified three exigent circumstances: emergency aid, hot pursuit, and destruction of evidence. The "emergency aid" exception allows officers to enter a home without a warrant to provide assistance to an occupant who is injured or under imminent threat of injury. The "hot pursuit" exception allows officers to pursue a fleeing suspect onto protected property without a warrant. The "destruction of evidence" exception permits warrantless entry when officers reasonably believe the occupants are destroying evidence of a crime.

Before Kentucky v. King was decided, lower courts had developed the "police-created exigency" doctrine, which stated that police may not create exigent circumstances to justify a warrantless search. The Supreme Court confronted the "police-created exigency" doctrine in Kentucky v. King.

== Facts ==
Police officers in Lexington, Kentucky, set up a drug buy outside of an apartment complex using an undercover informant. After the suspect sold the informant crack cocaine, Officer Gibson, who was undercover watching the transaction from a nearby unmarked vehicle, called in uniformed officers to pursue the suspect. The officers pursued the suspect into a breezeway and lost sight of him. They heard a door close, but when they got to the end of the breezeway, they encountered two doors and did not know whether the suspect entered the apartment on the right or the left. Officer Gibson saw the suspect enter the door on the right, but the other officers did not hear his radio transmission because it went to their vehicle.

While the officers did not know which apartment the suspect was in, they could smell burning marijuana coming from inside the apartment on the left. According to the testimony of one of the officers, the officers began banging on the left door "as loud as [they] could" and announced, "'This is the police,'" or "'Police, police, police,'" after which they heard movements which they believed indicated evidence was going to be destroyed. They announced they were going to enter and kicked down the door. They found Hollis King, the defendant, his girlfriend, and a guest who was smoking marijuana. Upon a further search of the home, they found cash, drugs, and paraphernalia.

== Procedural posture ==
King entered a conditional guilty plea in the Fayette Circuit Court, reserving his right to appeal denial of his motion to suppress evidence obtained from what he argued was an illegal search. The court sentenced King to eleven years in prison. The Kentucky Court of Appeals affirmed the conviction, holding that exigent circumstances supporting the warrantless search were not of the police's making and that police did not engage in deliberate and intentional conduct to evade the warrant requirement. In January 2010, the Kentucky Supreme Court reversed the lower court order, finding that the entry was improper. They reserved the issue of whether what the officers heard was sufficient to establish exigent circumstances. Even assuming exigent circumstances did exist, though, the Kentucky Supreme Court held that (1) officers cannot create exigent circumstances in bad faith and (2) even without bad faith, police cannot rely on exigent circumstances that are reasonably foreseeable from the officers' actions. They held the officers in this case violated the Fourth Amendment under the second theory.

== Issue ==
Does the exigent circumstances rule, which allows police officers to conduct a warrantless search, apply if the police create the exigent circumstances without violating or threatening to violate the Fourth Amendment?

== Decision ==
Justice Samuel Alito delivered the Court's majority opinion, holding that assuming for the purpose of argument that the exigent circumstances existed, the exigent circumstances rule applies because the officers did not create the exigency by violating or threatening to violate the Fourth Amendment.

Alito clarified the police-created exigency doctrine which had been percolating in the lower courts. He explained that the answer to that question, just as with any other Fourth Amendment question, is reasonableness: "the exigent circumstances rule justifies a warrantless search when the conduct of the police preceding the exigency is reasonable in the same sense. Where, as here, the police did not create the exigency by engaging or threatening to engage in conduct that violates the Fourth Amendment, warrantless entry to prevent the destruction of evidence is reasonable and thus allowed."

He rejected rules that impose requirements beyond lawful conduct, including bad faith; reasonable foreseeability; probable cause and time to secure a warrant; and standard or good investigative tactics. He also rejected King's proposed rule, which would prohibit officers from creating an exigency by "engag[ing] in conduct that would cause a reasonable person to believe that entry is imminent and inevitable," for turning on "subtleties" and requiring a "nebulous and impractical test."

He explained that the police officers actions before they entered the apartment, knocking and announcing their presence, were lawful and "no more than any private citizen might do." Assuming but not deciding that there were exigent circumstances, the police actions did not violate the Fourth Amendment.

The Supreme Court reversed and remanded the lower court.

In her dissenting opinion, Justice Ruth Bader Ginsburg contended that the majority allowed police to "dishonor the Fourth Amendment's warrant requirement in drug cases." She would have ruled that the exigency must exist when the police arrive at the scene and may not be created by their own conduct. She further pointed out that the facts here are indistinguishable from Johnson v. United States, 333 U. S. 10 (1948) in which the Court held a warrantless entry and search to be unconstitutional.

== Aftermath ==
In 2012, the Kentucky Supreme Court addressed the issue of whether exigency existed in the case, an issue that had been assumed by that court and the US Supreme Court. The state court decided that the prosecution had not met its burden of proving exigent circumstances to justify a warrantless entry since the police's testimony about movement inside the apartment were "indistinguishable from ordinary household sounds." The trial court's denial of King's motion to suppress was reversed, his conviction was vacated, and the case was remanded to the lower court.

== See also ==
- Schmerber v. California, 384 U.S. 757 (1966) (5–4): "Destruction of evidence" exception to the warrant requirement allows police to draw blood from a DUI suspect without a warrant because the officer reasonably believes the blood alcohol percentage will diminish in evidentiary value in the time it will take to secure a warrant.
- Brigham City v. Stuart, 547 U.S. 398 (2006) (9–0): "Emergency aid" exception to the warrant requirement allows police to make a warrantless entry into a home when they have "an objectively reasonable basis for believing that an occupant is seriously injured or imminently threatened with such injury."
- Illinois v. McArthur, 531 U.S. 326 (2001) (8–1): "Destruction of evidence" exception allows police to briefly seize defendant by ordering him to stay outside of his home to prevent him from destroying evidence while police obtained a search warrant for the home.
- Payton v. New York, 445 U.S. 573 (1980): Absent exigent circumstances, police may not make a warrantless entry into a home in order to make a felony arrest.
- List of United States Supreme Court cases, volume 563
