= Bankruptcy discharge =

Releases individual or business from debts to creditors

A bankruptcy discharge is a court order that releases an individual or business from specific debts and obligations they owe to creditors. In other words, it's a legal process that eliminates the debtor's liability to pay certain types of debts they owe before filing the bankruptcy case.

Once a bankruptcy discharge is granted, the debtor is no longer legally required to pay back the discharged debts, and creditors are prohibited from attempting to collect on those debts. This means that the debtor can have a fresh financial start and move forward without the burden of overwhelming debt.

Although the debtor is not personally liable for discharged debts, a secured creditor can claim any liens or property interest in the debtor's property that have not been made unenforceable by the courts. For example, if the debtor sells a property lien, the secured creditor is entitled to receive payment from the sale.

It's important to note that not all debts are dischargeable in bankruptcy. Additionally, there are specific requirements that a debtor must meet to be eligible for a discharge, such as completing credit counseling and complying with other legal requirements. A debtor who has received a discharge may voluntarily repay any discharged debt, even though the debt is no longer legally enforceable. This is common when the debtor has a special relationship with the creditor, such as a family member or doctor.

If the debtor loses the discharge order, the debtor can request a copy of the document from the clerk of the bankruptcy court that entered the order. Typically, fees are associated with the retrieval and certification of the documents. Some bankruptcy courts may use the PACER system, where the debtor can access the discharge order electronically.

== History ==
The history of bankruptcy law in the United States dates back to the early colonial era. This law was modeled after the laws of England, where bankruptcy laws have existed since 1542. The first bankruptcy law in the United States was enacted in 1800, and since then, the law has undergone numerous revisions and amendments. Article I, § 8, cl. 4 of the U.S. Constitution empowered the federal government to create and oversee a national bankruptcy law.

Previously, bankruptcy laws were designed to benefit creditors rather than debtors. The first U.S. bankruptcy law, known as the Bankruptcy Act of 1800, provided for liquidating the debtor's assets and distributing the proceeds to the debtor's creditors and did not provide for a discharge of debts. This law was repealed just three years later due to concerns that it was too harsh on debtors.

In 1838, the U.S. government enacted a new bankruptcy law, which allowed debtors to file for bankruptcy voluntarily and provided for the discharge of certain debts. However, this law was also repealed just a few years later due to concerns that it was too lenient on debtors.

It was in the Bankruptcy Act of 1898 that the modern system of bankruptcy law in the United States was established. This law provided for both voluntary and involuntary bankruptcy and allowed for the discharge of certain debts. The 1898 Act also established bankruptcy courts and created the position of a bankruptcy trustee to oversee bankruptcy cases.

Since then, bankruptcy law in the United States has undergone several significant revisions. In 1978, the Bankruptcy Reform Act was enacted, which created the current system of Chapter 7, Chapter 11, and Chapter 13 bankruptcies. The Bankruptcy Abuse Prevention and Consumer Protection Act (BAPCPA) was enacted in 2005, which made significant changes to the bankruptcy law, including stricter eligibility requirements for Chapter 7 bankruptcy and additional filing requirements for debtors limiting the ability of debtors to discharge certain debts.

== Types of Bankruptcy Discharge ==
In a Chapter 7 case, the debtor has no absolute right to discharge. A creditor or trustee may file an objection to the discharge of the debt. To object to a discharge, a creditor must file a complaint before the deadline outlined in the notice sent by the bankruptcy court. More than 90% of Chapter 7 debtors receive a discharge of debts.

The court would deny a discharge in a subsequent Chapter 7 case if the debtor received a previous discharge under Chapter 7 or Chapter 11 filed within eight years of the second filing of the petition. If the debtor received a discharge in a Chapter 12 or Chapter 13 case filed within six years of the second case filing unless the debtor paid all allowed unsecured claims in the earlier case in full or if the debtor made at least 70% of the allowed unsecured claims in the previous case's plan with good faith and best effort by the debtor.

In Chapter 12 and Chapter 13 cases, the debtor is usually entitled to a discharge upon completing all payments under the plan. If the debtor fails to complete a required personal finance course after filing a Chapter 13, they will be ineligible for their discharge. Roughly 25-40% of Chapter 13 debts receive a discharge.

== Bankruptcy discharge for the debtor ==
In the United States, there are generally seven kinds of debtor discharges in bankruptcy, found in the following statutes:

11 U.S.C. § 727(a) (relating to liquidation bankruptcies for individuals);

11 U.S.C. § 944(b) (relating to municipal bankruptcies);

11 U.S.C. § 1141(d)(1)(A) (relating to discharges resulting from confirmation of a Chapter 11 plan of reorganization);

11 U.S.C. § 1228(a) (relating to certain family farmer or fisherman cases);

11 U.S.C. § 1228(b) (relating to certain family farmer or fisherman cases);

11 U.S.C. § 1328(a) (relating to certain cases involving adjustment of debts of an individual with regular income);

11 U.S.C. § 1328(b) (relating to certain cases involving adjustment of debts of an individual with regular income).

The effect of the debtor's discharge is provided for at 11 U.S.C. § 524. In addition, certain limitations on the debtor's discharge are described at 11 U.S.C. § 523.

For more information on the debtor's discharge, see Bankruptcy in the United States.

== Exceptions to Bankruptcy Discharge ==
There are 19 categories of debt excepted from discharge under Chapter 7, 11, and 12. Several types of debts are generally not dischargeable in bankruptcy under §523. These include certain taxes, such as payroll taxes, student loans, child support, alimony, and debts arising from fraud or intentional wrongdoing. Debts owed for fines and penalties imposed by government agencies, debts owed for willful or malicious injury to another person or property are not dischargeable in bankruptcy. Debts not listed on the bankruptcy schedules or debts intentionally concealed in the proceedings cannot be discharged in bankruptcy.

Debts dischargeable in Chapter 13 but not in Chapter 7 include debts for willful and malicious injury to property, debts incurred to pay non-dischargeable tax obligations, and debts arising from property settlements in divorce or separation proceedings.

== Revoking of Discharge ==
Under certain circumstances, the court has the power to revoke a discharge. For example, when a trustee, creditor, or the U.S. trustee appeals the discharge based on the debtor's fraudulent activity, failure to disclose property that would belong to the bankruptcy estate, or failure to provide information during an audit. Typically, the appealing party must file within a year of the discharge or before the case is closed to revoke the discharge. In Chapter 11, 12, and 13 cases, the court can cancel the order if the debtor receives a discharge because of fraud. The court will determine if the allegations are true and, if so, will decide whether to rescind the discharge.

== Other discharges in bankruptcy ==
In the United States, with respect to taxes incurred by the bankruptcy estate (as opposed to the debtor) during case administration, a specialized discharge for the trustee, the debtor, any successor to the debtor, and (for cases commenced on or after October 17, 2005) the bankruptcy estate is provided in 11 U.S.C. § 505(b).

At the conclusion of a case the trustee (if any) may be discharged as trustee under 11 U.S.C. § 350(a).
