= Bankruptcy Abuse Prevention and Consumer Protection Act =

2005 American bill

Bankruptcy Abuse Prevention and Consumer Protection Act of 2005
- Long title: An Act to amend title 11 of the United States Code, and for other purposes.
- Acronyms (colloquial): BAPCPA
- Nicknames: Bankruptcy Reform
- Enacted by: the 109th United States Congress

Citations
- Public law: Pub. L. 109–8 (text) (PDF)
- Statutes at Large: 119 Stat. 23—217

Legislative history
- Introduced in the Senate as S. 256 by Chuck Grassley (R-IA) on February 1, 2005; Committee consideration by Senate Judiciary, House Judiciary; Passed the Senate on March 10, 2005 (74–25); Passed the House on April 14, 2005 (302–126); Signed into law by President George W. Bush on April 20, 2005

United States Supreme Court cases
- Milavetz, Gallop & Milavetz, P. A. v. United States, 559 U.S. 229 (2010); Ransom v. FIA Card Services, N.A., 562 U.S. 61 (2011)

The Bankruptcy Abuse Prevention and Consumer Protection Act of 2005 (BAPCPA) (Pub. L. 109–8 (text) (PDF), 119 Stat. 23, enacted April 20, 2005) is a legislative act that made several significant changes to the United States Bankruptcy Code.

Referred to colloquially as the "New Bankruptcy Law", the act of Congress attempts to, among other things, make it more difficult for some consumers to file bankruptcy under Chapter 7; some of these consumers may instead utilize Chapter 13.

It was passed by the 109th United States Congress on April 14, 2005, and signed into law by President George W. Bush on April 20, 2005. Provisions of the act apply to cases filed on or after October 17, 2005.

== Provisions ==
The Bankruptcy Abuse Prevention and Consumer Protection Act (BAPCPA) made changes to American bankruptcy laws, affecting both consumer and business bankruptcies. Many of the bill's provisions were explicitly designed by the bill's Congressional sponsors to make it "more difficult for people to file for bankruptcy." The BAPCPA was intended to make it more difficult for debtors to file a Chapter 7 Bankruptcy—under which most debts are forgiven (or discharged)—and instead required them to file a Chapter 13 Bankruptcy—under which the debts they incurred are discharged only after the debtor has repaid some portion of these debts.

Some of the bill's more significant provisions include the following:

=== Presumption of abuse ===
Prior to the BAPCPA Amendments, debtors of all incomes could file for bankruptcy under Chapter 7. BAPCPA restricted the number of debtors that could declare Chapter 7 bankruptcy. The act sets out a method to calculate a debtor's income, and compares this amount to the median income of the debtor's state. If the debtor's income is above the median income amount of the debtor's state, the debtor is subject to a "means test."

The most noteworthy change brought by the 2005 BAPCPA amendments occurred within 11 U.S.C. § 707(b). Congress amended this section of the Bankruptcy Code to provide for the dismissal or conversion of a Chapter 7 case upon a finding of "abuse" by an individual debtor (or married couple) with "primarily consumer debt". The pre-BAPCPA language of § 707(b) provided for dismissal of a chapter 7 case upon a finding of "substantial abuse". Under the former § 707(b), only the court or the United States trustee could bring a motion to find abuse under the section. The 2005 amendments removed these restrictions.

Post-BAPCPA, § 707(b) provides two definitions of "abuse". "Abuse" may be found when there is an unrebutted "presumption of abuse" arising under a BAPCPA-created "means test", [see 11 U.S.C. § 707(b)(2)], or through a finding of bad faith, determined by a totality of the circumstances [see 11 U.S.C. § 707(b)(3)].

==== Means test ====
Only debtors whose monthly income is higher than the median income of their state, as calculated by the Code, are subject to being found abusive under § 707(b)(2). Debtors whose income falls below the median income figure may be in violation of the means test, however no party is permitted to file a motion in order to find abuse under § 707(b)(2), [see 11 U.S.C. § 707(b)(7)]. This creates a means test "safe harbor" for debtors below the state's median income figure.

Current monthly income is defined in 11 U.S.C. § 101(10A) as the monthly average of the income received by the debtor (and the debtor's spouse in a joint case) during a defined six-month time period prior to the filing of the bankruptcy case. Some narrow classes of payments, for example, social security, are excluded from these figures. Notably, the average income may be higher or lower than the debtor's actual income at the time of filing for bankruptcy. This has led some commentators to refer to the bankruptcy code's "current monthly income" as "presumed income". If the debtor's debt is not primarily consumer debt, then the means test is inapplicable.

The applicable median income figure is adjusted by family size. Generally, the larger the family, the greater the applicable median income figure and the more money the debtor must earn before a presumption of abuse arises. A chart of the most recent applicable median incomes by state can be found at the US Trustee's website.

This code section then requires a comparison between the debtor's "current monthly income" and the median income for the debtor's state. If the debtor's income exceeds the median income, then the debtor must apply the means test.

For debtors subject to the means test, the test is calculated as follows. The debtor's "current monthly income" is reduced by a set of allowed deductions specified by the IRS. These deductions are not necessarily the actual expenses the debtor incurs on a monthly basis. Some commentators have referred to these deductions as "presumed expenses".

The deductions applicable in the "means test" are defined in 11 U.S.C. § 707(b)(2)(A), (ii)-(iv) and include:

- living expenses specified under the "collection standards of the Internal Revenue Service",
- actual expenses not provided by the Internal Revenue Standards including "reasonably necessary health insurance, disability insurance, and health savings account expenses",
- expenses for protection from family violence,
- continued contributions to care of nondependent family members,
- actual expenses of administering a chapter 13 plan,
- expenses for grade and high school, up to $1,500 annually per minor child provided that the expenses are reasonable and necessary,
- additional home energy costs in addition to those laid out in the IRS guidelines that are reasonable and necessary,
- 1/60th of all secured debt that will become due in the five years after the filing of the bankruptcy case,
- 1/60th of all priority debt, and
- continued contributions to tax-exempt charities.

An itemized list of the applicable IRS living standards can be found at the US Trustee's website.

A "presumption of abuse" will arise if: (1) the debtor has at least $182.50 in current monthly income available after the allowed deductions (this equals $10,950 over five years) regardless of the amount of debt, or (2) the debtor has at least $109.59 of such income ($6,575 over five years) and this sum would be enough to pay general unsecured creditors more than 25% over five years. For example, if a debtor had exactly $109.59 of "current monthly income" left after deductions and owed less than $26,300 in general unsecured debt, then the presumption of abuse would arise, [see 11 U.S.C. § 707(b)(2)(A)(i)].

If a presumption of abuse is found under the means test, it may only be rebutted in the case of "special circumstances", [see 11 U.S.C. § 707(b)(2)(B)].

==== Nonpresumed abuse ====
Even in cases where there is no presumption of abuse, it is still possible for a Chapter 7 case to be dismissed or converted. If the debtor's "current monthly income" is below the median income, as discussed above, only the court or the United States trustee (or bankruptcy administrator) can seek dismissal or conversion of the debtor's case. If the debtor's "current monthly income" is above the median income, as discussed above, any party in interest may seek dismissal or conversion of the case. The grounds for dismissal under 11 U.S.C. § 707(b)(3) are the filing of a petition in "bad faith", or when "the totality of the circumstances (including whether the debtor seeks to reject a personal services contract and the financial need for such rejection as sought by the debtor) of the debtor's financial situation demonstrates abuse."

=== Waiting period between filings ===
Another change that resulted from the BAPCPA was an extension of the time between multiple bankruptcy filings. 11 U.S.C. § 727(a)(8) was amended to provide that the debtor would be denied a discharge if a debtor had received a discharge in a prior Chapter 7 case filed within eight years of the filing of the present case. Prior to BAPCPA, the rule was six years between chapter 7 filings. BAPCPA did not change the rule for the waiting period if the debtor filed a chapter 13 previously.

=== Credit counseling and debtor education requirements ===
Another major change to the law enacted by BAPCPA deals with eligibility. Section 109(h) provides that a debtor will no longer be eligible to file under either chapter 7 or chapter 13 unless within 180 days prior to filing the debtor received an "individual or group briefing" from a nonprofit budget and credit counseling agency approved by the United States trustee or bankruptcy administrator.

The new legislation also requires that all individual debtors in either chapter 7 or chapter 13 complete an "instructional course concerning personal financial management." If a chapter 7 debtor does not complete the course, it constitutes grounds for denial of discharge pursuant to new 11 U.S.C. § 727(a)(11). The financial management program is experimental and the effectiveness of the program is to be studied for 18 months. Theoretically, if the educational courses prove to be ineffective, the requirement may disappear.

In 2006 more than half of all certified pre-filing counseling sessions were rendered by the three largest agencies: Money Management International, Consumer Credit Counseling Service of Greater Atlanta and GreenPath Debt Solutions.

A 2007 GAO report was inconclusive regarding the efficacy of the counseling provisions and concluded that there is no mechanism in place to evaluate it:

... the value of the counseling requirement is not clear. The counseling was intended to help consumers make informed choices about bankruptcy and its alternatives. Yet anecdotal evidence suggests that by the time most clients receive the counseling, their financial situations are dire, leaving them with no viable alternative to bankruptcy. As a result, the requirement may often serve more as an administrative obstacle than as a timely presentation of meaningful options. Because no mechanism currently exists to track the outcomes of the counseling, policymakers and program managers are unable to fully assess how well the requirement is serving its intended purpose.

— Government Accounting Office, Bankruptcy Reform: Value of Credit Counseling Requirement Is Not Clear

=== Applicability of Automatic Stay ===
The automatic stay in bankruptcy is the result of Section 362 of the Bankruptcy Code that requires all collection proceedings to stop. There are exceptions, of course, but generally this is the term for the "relief" from collection proceedings a debtor receives by filing the bankruptcy with the bankruptcy clerk's office. BAPCPA limited the protections the stay provides in some re-filed cases. New § 362(c)(3) provides that if the debtor files a chapter 7, 11 or 13 case within one year of the dismissal of an earlier case, the automatic stay in the present case terminates 30 days after the filing, unless the debtor or some other party in interest files a motion and demonstrates that the present case was filed in good faith with respect to the creditor, or creditors, being stayed. If the present case is a third filing within one year, the automatic stay does not go into effect at all, unless the debtor or any other party in interest files a motion to impose the stay that demonstrates that the third filing is in good faith with respect to the creditor, or creditors, being stayed.

The provision presumes that the repeat filings are not in good faith and requires the party seeking to impose the stay (usually the debtor) to rebut the presumption by clear and convincing evidence.

There are exceptions. Notably, § 362(i) provides that the presumption that the repeat filing was not in good faith would not arise in a "subsequent" case if a debtor's prior case was dismissed "due to the creation of a debt repayment plan."

BAPCPA also limited the applicability of the automatic stay in eviction proceedings. The stay does not stop an eviction proceeding if the landlord has already obtained a judgment of possession prior to the bankruptcy case being filed, § 362(b)(22). The stay also would not apply in a situation where the eviction is based on "endangerment" of the rented property or "illegal use of controlled substances" on the property, § 362(b)(23). In either situation the landlord must file with the court and serve on the debtor a certificate of non-applicability of the stay spelling out the facts giving rise to one of the exceptions. There is a process for the debtor to contest the assertions in the landlord's certificate or if state law gives the debtor an additional right to cure the default even after an order for possession is entered, § 362(l) & (m).

In addition, BAPCPA extends the exceptions to automatic stay to certain paternity, child custody, domestic violence and domestic and child support proceedings.

=== Stricter notice requirements ===
BAPCPA enacts a provision that protects creditors from monetary penalties for violating the stay if the debtor did not give "effective" notice pursuant to § 342, [§ 342(g)]. The new notice provisions require the debtor to give notice of the bankruptcy to the creditor at an "address filed by the creditor with the court," or "at an address stated in two communications from the creditor to the debtor within 90 days of the filing of the bankruptcy case. The notice must also include the account number used by the creditor in the two relevant communications [§ 342(c)(2)(e) & (f)]. An ineffective notice can be cured if the notice is later "brought to the attention of the creditor." This means that the notice must be received by a person designated by the creditor to receive bankruptcy notices.

=== Dischargeability ===
BAPCPA also provided more protections to creditors because it expanded the exceptions to discharge. The presumption of fraud in the use of credit cards was expanded. The amount that the debtor must charge for "luxury goods" to invoke the presumption is reduced from $1,225 to $500. The amount of cash advances that would give rise to a presumption of fraud has also been reduced, from $1,225 to $750. The time period was increased from 60 days to 90 days. Thus, if a debtor purchases any single item for more than $500 within 90 days of filing, the presumption that the debt was incurred fraudulently and therefore non-dischargeable in the bankruptcy arises. Prior to BAPCPA, the presumption would not have arisen unless the purchase was for more than $1,225 and was made within 60 days of filing (§ 523(a)(2)(C)).

BAPCPA amended § 523(a)(8) to broaden the types of educational ("student") loans that cannot be discharged in bankruptcy absent proof of "undue hardship." The nature of the lender is no longer relevant. Thus, even loans from "for-profit" or "non-governmental" entities are not dischargeable.

=== Lien avoidance ===
Some types of liens may be avoided through a chapter 7 bankruptcy case. However, BAPCPA limited the ability of debtors to avoid liens through bankruptcy. The definition of "household goods" was changed—for example, by limiting "electronic equipment" to one radio, one television, one VCR, and one personal computer with related equipment. The definition now excludes certain items such as works of art not created by the debtor or a relative of the debtor, jewelry worth more than $500, with adjustment for inflation (except wedding rings), and motor vehicles. Prior to BAPCPA, the definition of household goods was broader so that more items could have been included, including more than one television, VCR, radio, etc.

=== Limits to the homestead exemption ===
Under the new law, the homestead exemption, which allows bankruptcy filers in some states to exempt the value of their homes from creditors, is limited in various ways. If a filer acquired their home less than 1,215 days (40 months) before filing, or if they have been convicted of security law violations or been found guilty of certain crimes, they may only exempt up to $125,000 (adjusted periodically), regardless of a state's exemption allowance.(§ 522(p)(1)). Filers must also wait 730 days before they are allowed to use their state's exemptions. (§ 522(b)(3)(A)). There is an exception if the property is "reasonably necessary for the support of the debtor and any dependent of the debtor."

These provisions were largely intended to prevent filers from forum shopping, i.e. moving assets and domiciles to a state with more favorable exemptions and filing.

=== Exemptions ===
BAPCPA attempted to eliminate the perceived "forum shopping" by changing the rules on claiming exemptions. Exemptions define the amount of property debtors may protect from liquidation to pay creditors. Typically, every state has exemption laws that define the amount of property that can be protected from creditor collection action within the state. There is also a federal statute that defines exemptions in federal cases. In bankruptcy, Congress allowed states to opt out of the federal exemption scheme. Opt out states still controlled the amount of property that could be protected from creditors, or "exempted" from creditors, in bankruptcy cases.

Under BAPCPA, a debtor who has moved from one state to another within two years of filing (730 days) the bankruptcy case must use exemptions from the place of the debtor's domicile for the majority of the 180-day time period preceding the two years (730 days) before the filing [§ 522(b)(3)]. If the new residency requirement would render the debtor ineligible for any exemption, then the debtor can choose the federal exemptions.

Also, there is a "cap" placed upon the homestead exemption in situations where the debtor, within 1215 days (about 3 years and 4 months) preceding the bankruptcy case added value to a homestead. The provision provides that "any value in excess of $125,000" added to a homestead can not be exempted. The only exception is if the value was transferred from another homestead within the same state or if the homestead is the principal residence of a family farmer (§ 522(p)). This "cap" would apply in situations where a debtor has purchased a new homestead in a different state, or where the debtor has increased the value to his/her homestead (presumably through a remodeling or addition).

=== Additional requirements for filers ===
The new law adds a number of new requirements for bankruptcy filers that attempt to make the filing process more difficult and costly. These additional requirements include:

- Additional filing requirements and fees. The new law increases the amount of paperwork involved in filing and raises the filing fees. The law also allows filing fees to be waived for debtors earning below 150 percent of the federal poverty level.
- Increased attorney liability and costs. Attorneys representing bankruptcy filers are now required to conduct an investigation of their clients' filings and can be held personally liable for inaccuracies. Most bankruptcy attorneys predicted that this will result in increased attorneys fees and will make attorneys less likely to take on some cases. In addition, bankruptcy filings are now subject to audit in a manner similar to tax returns.
- Increased compliance requirements for small businesses. The new law increases the bureaucratic compliance obligations and shortens the deadline for Chapter 11 reorganizations involving small businesses, a series of new requirements not applicable to larger businesses.
- Increased amount of debt repayment under Chapter 13. The new law made several changes that effectively increased the amount of debt that Chapter 13 filers will have to repay.

=== Other changes ===
- The new law allows creditors to pursue collection remedies without court permission in various circumstances such as offsetting tax refunds, pursuing tax and domestic relations litigation in all respects except the final turnover of assets from the estate, establishing wage assignments in domestic relations actions, repossessing vehicles and personal property subject to loans or leases 45 days after the first meeting of creditors in cases where no court action has been taken regarding that property, and allowing evictions that completed the court process prior to the filing of the petition or involve endangerment to property or drug use to proceed. The law also makes it easier for creditors who received preferential payments of less than $5,000 from the debtor before bankruptcy to avoid repaying such payments for the benefit of all creditors.
- The law improves the ability of the bankruptcy estate to reclaim assets placed in asset protection trusts within ten years of filing or paid as employment bonuses to insiders within two years prior to filing.
- The law makes Chapter 12 bankruptcy (farm reorganization) permanent while adding family fishermen, overhauls the treatment of complex financial contracts including many derivative contracts used by hedge funds, and overhauls the treatment of ancillary foreign bankruptcy proceedings.
- The law extends protection to non-ERISA pension plans like private sector 403(b)s and some Individual Retirement Account that ERISA plans had enjoyed thereby making these plans more similar to ERISA plans.
- The law raises the priority status for payment of domestic support obligations (such as alimony and child support) from seventh place to first, only behind the administrative expenses of the trustee. This means that domestic support claimants get paid before all other unsecured creditors.

== Legislative history ==
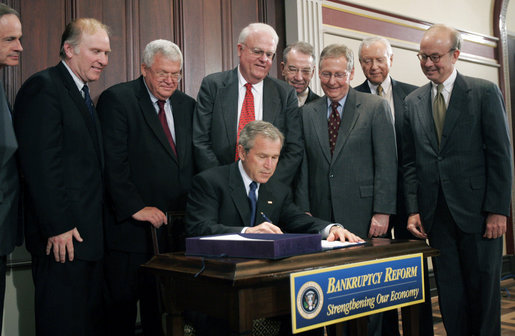
President George W. Bush signs into law the Bankruptcy Abuse Prevention and Consumer Protection Act on April 20, 2005.

The 2005 bankruptcy bill was actually first drafted in 1997 and first introduced in 1998. The United States House of Representatives approved a version titled the "Bankruptcy Reform Act of 1999" and the Senate approved a slightly different version in 2000. After the differences in the bills were reconciled, Congress passed the "Bankruptcy Reform Act of 2000". President Clinton, however, employed what is known as a "pocket veto" by waiting for the lame duck congressional session to adjourn without signing the bill, a legislative maneuver tantamount to a veto. Professor Elizabeth Warren, a member of the National Bankruptcy Review Commission at that time, briefed First Lady Clinton on negative effects of the bill; according to Warren, after the briefing:

President Clinton had been showing that this is another way that he could be helpful to business. It wasn't a very high visibility bill. And when Mrs. Clinton came back with a little better understanding of how it all worked, they reversed course, and they reversed course fast. And indeed, the proof is in the pudding. The last bill that came before President Clinton was that bankruptcy bill that was passed by the House and the Senate in 2000 and he vetoed it. And in her autobiography, Mrs. Clinton took credit for that veto and she rightly should. She turned around a whole administration on the subject of bankruptcy. She got it.

In the years since 2000, the bill was introduced in each Congress, but was repeatedly shelved due to threats of a filibuster from its opponents and because of disagreements over various amendments, including one backed by Senate Democrats that would have made it harder for anti-abortion groups to discharge court fines related to legal debts incurred from lawsuits filed by pro-abortion groups.

The increase in Republican majorities in the Senate and House after the 2004 elections breathed new life into the bill, which was introduced in its current form by the chairman of the Senate Finance Committee, Republican Senator Chuck Grassley of Iowa. According to George Packer in his book The Unwinding, Joe Biden, Chris Dodd, and Hillary Clinton helped pass this bill. (Of the three, however, only Biden voted for the final bill. Dodd voted against, and Clinton did not vote.) The bill was supported by President George W. Bush. Tom DeLay also championed the legislation. The bill passed by large margins, 302–126 in the House and 74–25 in the Senate, and was signed into law by President Bush.

== Support ==
Support for the act mostly came from banks, credit card companies, and other creditors.

Since banks, credit companies and other creditors are the ones who must bear the losses for debts discharged through bankruptcy, their lobby power was a major supporting factor to eventually prevailing and getting Congress to pass the Bankruptcy Abuse Prevention and Consumer Protection Act of 2005.

It was widely claimed by advocates of BAPCPA that its passage would reduce losses to creditors such as credit card companies, and that those creditors would then pass on the savings to other borrowers in the form of lower interest rates. These claims turned out to be false. After BAPCPA passed, although credit card company losses decreased, prices charged to customers increased, and credit card company profits soared.

== Criticisms ==
The 2005 bankruptcy bill was opposed by a wide variety of groups, including consumer advocates, legal scholars, retired bankruptcy judges, and the editorial pages of many national and regional newspapers. While criticisms of the bill were wide-ranging, the central objections of its opponents focused on the bill's sponsors' contention that bankruptcy fraud was widespread, the strict means test that would force more debtors to file under Chapter 13 (under which a percentage of debts must be paid over a period of 3–5 years) as opposed to Chapter 7 (under which debts are paid only out of existing assets), the additional penalties and responsibilities the bill placed on debtors, and the bill's many provisions favorable to credit card companies. Opponents of the bill regularly pointed out that the credit card industry spent more than $100 million lobbying for the bill over the course of eight years. There has also been significant criticism of BAPCPA's changes to Chapter 11 business bankruptcies. Harvey Miller, one of the most-prominent bankruptcy attorneys in the country (particularly in terms of representing corporate debtors) has described BAPCPA as "ill-conceived."

One of the primary stated purposes of the bankruptcy bill was to cut down on abusive or fraudulent uses of the bankruptcy system. As Congressman F. James Sensenbrenner Jr. (R-Wis), one of the bill's key supporters in the House, argued, "This bill will help restore responsibility and integrity to the bankruptcy system by cracking down on fraudulent, abusive, and opportunistic bankruptcy claims." Opponents of the bill argued that claims of bankruptcy abuse and fraud were wildly overblown, and that the vast majority of bankruptcies were related to medical expenses and job losses. These arguments were bolstered by an in-depth study and survey of 1,771 bankruptcy cases by scholars at Harvard University, of whom 931 submitted to interviews. The study found that "about half" of bankruptcy filers in the year 2001 cited out-of-pocket medical bills in excess of $10,000 as a major contributor to bankruptcy (the average bankruptcy filer in this study was a 41-year-old woman with a median income of $25,000, slightly below the personal income average for that year).

Perhaps the most controversial provisions of the bill was the strict means test it established to determine whether a debtor's filing under Chapter 7 of the bankruptcy code would be considered as an "abuse" and therefore subject to dismissal. This decision was previously made by a bankruptcy court judge, who would evaluate the particular circumstances that led to a bankruptcy. Critics of the means test, which is triggered if a debtor makes more than their state's median income, argued that it ignored the many causes of individual bankruptcies, including job loss, family illnesses, and predatory lending, and would force debtors seeking to challenge the test into costly litigation, driving them even further into debt.

Besides the stricter means test, opponents of the bill also objected to the many other obstacles the bill creates for individuals seeking bankruptcy protection. These changes included more detailed reporting requirements, higher fees, mandated credit counseling, and the additional liability placed on bankruptcy attorneys, which critics argued would drive up attorneys' fees and decrease the number of lawyers willing to help consumers file. These criticisms were partly borne out in the months following the new law, as lawyers have reported that the bankruptcy process has become significantly more arduous, forcing them to charge higher fees and take fewer clients.

One criticism of the law was that the law made the discharge of liability for medical bills more difficult.

A major target of the bill's opponents were provisions they described as beneficial to credit card companies. In particular, critics objected to the extension to eight years from six to the time before which debtors could liquidate their debts through bankruptcy, and requirements that those who file for multiple bankruptcies pay previous credit card debt that would have been forgiven under the old law. The bill's opponents were especially critical of provisions that expanded exemptions to the discharge of credit card debt, forcing spouses owed alimony to compete more often with credit card companies and other lenders for their unpaid child support. More broadly the bill's critics argued that the legislation did nothing to curtail what they characterize as predatory practices of credit card companies, such as exorbitant interest rates, rising and often hidden fees, and targeting minors and the recently bankrupt for new cards. The bill's critics argue that these practices are themselves significant contributors to the growth of consumer bankruptcies.

== Hurricane Katrina bankruptcies ==
Jim Sensenbrenner, Republican chairman of the House Judiciary Committee claimed: "If someone in Katrina is down and out, and has no possibility of being able to repay 40 percent or more of their debts, then the new bankruptcy law doesn't apply.

The United States Trustee program has since said it would not attempt to enforce the means test rules for disaster victims, including those affected by Hurricane Katrina. The Justice Department Trustees oversee the administration of bankruptcy law and are able to file the motions necessary to enforce the means test. Despite these assurances, bankruptcy judges are still able to enforce these rules sua sponte.

The Department of Justice also indicated it would not oppose a debtor's eligibility to file bankruptcy because the debtor did not fulfill the credit counseling requirements before filing. U.S. Trustees have the discretion to grant waivers of the credit counseling requirements to debtors. See 11 U.S.C. § 109(h)(2).

== 2008 financial crisis ==
As the Financial Times noted during the fall of 2008, "the 2005 changes made clear that certain derivatives and financial transactions were exempt from provisions in the bankruptcy code that freeze a failed company's assets until a court decides how to apportion them among creditors." This radically altered the historic process of paying off creditors and did so just a few years prior to trillions of dollars in assets going into liquidation as a consequence of bankruptcies following the 2008 financial crisis.

Some observers have argued that this contributed to the 2008 financial crisis by removing the incentive that creditors would normally have to keep a borrower out of bankruptcy. Institutions who provided short-term funding to financial firms such as Bear Stearns and Lehman through repo lending could abruptly withdraw that funding even if it risked pushing the firms into bankruptcy, because they did not have to worry about tying up their claims in bankruptcy court, due to the new safe harbor provisions of BAPCPA.

== Case law interpreting the Act ==
- Ransom v. FIA Card Services, N. A., 562 U.S. ___ (2011), involving the Chapter 13 means test

== See also ==
- 2008 financial crisis
- Bankruptcy Act
