= Ransom v. FIA Card Services, N.A. =

Ransom v. FIA Card Services, N. A.
- Supreme Court of the United States

Argued October 4, 2010 Decided January 11, 2011
- Full case name: Jason M. Ransom v. FIA Card Services, N. A., fka MBNA America Bank, N.A.
- Docket no.: 09-907
- Citations: 562 U.S. 61 (more) 131 S. Ct. 716; 178 L. Ed. 2d 603
- Argument: Oral argument

Case history
- Prior: Plan confirmation denied, Bankr. Ct.; aff'd, In re Ransom, 380 B.R. 799 (9th Cir. B.A.P. 2007); affirmed, 577 F.3d 1026 (9th Cir. 2009); cert. granted, sub nom. Ransom v. MBNA, America Bank, N.A., 559 U.S. 1066 (2010).

Holding
- A Chapter 13 debtor who owns a car, but does not make loan or lease payments on it, may not take the car-ownership income allowance set forth in the Internal Revenue Service's National Standards, when calculating the means test set forth at 11 U.S.C. § 707(b). Ninth Circuit affirmed.

Court membership
- Chief Justice John Roberts Associate Justices Antonin Scalia · Anthony Kennedy; Clarence Thomas · Ruth Bader Ginsburg; Stephen Breyer · Samuel Alito; Sonia Sotomayor · Elena Kagan

Case opinions
- Majority: Kagan, joined by Roberts, Kennedy, Thomas, Ginsburg, Breyer, Alito, Sotomayor
- Dissent: Scalia

Laws applied
- 11 U.S.C. § 707(b) (Chapter 13 of the United States Bankruptcy Code, as amended by the Bankruptcy Abuse Prevention and Consumer Protection Act of 2005)

Ransom v. FIA Card Services, N. A., 562 U.S. 61 (2011), is a decision by the Supreme Court of the United States involving the means test in Chapter 13 of the United States Bankruptcy Code. The means test had been adopted by the Bankruptcy Abuse Prevention and Consumer Protection Act of 2005, and Ransom is one of several cases in which the Supreme Court addressed provisions of that act.

The means test determines how much disposable income debtors have to pay back their creditors, and permits debtors to shield some income from creditors for expenses based on cost tables prepared by the Internal Revenue Service. The Court ruled in Ransom, primarily in reliance on supplemental commentary authored by the IRS, that a car-ownership cost allowance was available only to debtors who made loan or lease payments on a vehicle. This judgment resolved a circuit split regarding the allowance between the Ninth Circuit, which the Supreme Court affirmed in this case, and three other circuits that had all ruled the allowance applied even to debtors who owned their cars outright.

The Court's opinion was delivered by Justice Elena Kagan, who was confirmed to the Court on August 7, 2010. The opinion was not only her first as a Supreme Court justice but also as a judge, and her participation in the case's oral argument, which was held on the first day of the Court's 2010 term, had also been her first. Justice Antonin Scalia, the sole dissenter, criticized the Court for using the supplemental commentary on the tables when the Bankruptcy Code only incorporated the tables but not the commentary.

== Background of the case ==
=== The Chapter 13 means test ===
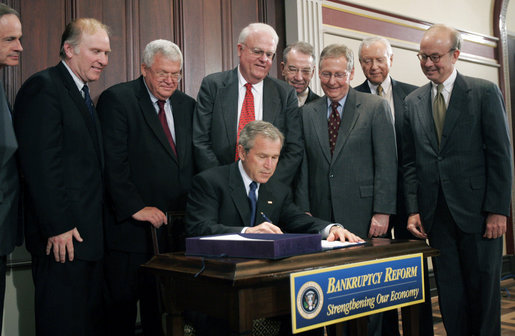
President George W. Bush signs into law the Bankruptcy Abuse Prevention and Consumer Protection Act on April 20, 2005.

Congress enacted the Bankruptcy Abuse Prevention and Consumer Protection Act of 2005 (BAPCPA) to address perceived abuses of the bankruptcy system. One of the biggest changes, called the "heart" of the Act's "bankruptcy reforms," was the adoption of the means test for use in Chapter 13 bankruptcy proceedings. Chapter 13 requires debtors to submit a repayment plan for court approval to obtain a discharge of their debts. The means test is a statutory formula that determines how much income the debtor can use for debt repayment, to ensure that debtors pay back as much as feasible. It permits debtors to shield a portion of their income from creditors based on "reasonably necessary" living expenses, which are calculated from claimed allowances for defined living expenses. This replaced the prior practice of bankruptcy courts having to make case-by-case determinations of a debtor's expenses to calculate available income.

The statute provides, in relevant part:

The debtor's monthly expenses shall be the debtor's applicable monthly expense amounts specified under the National Standards and Local Standards, and the debtor's actual monthly expenses for the categories specified as Other Necessary Expenses issued by the Internal Revenue Service for the area in which the debtor resides."

The National Standards and Local Standards referred to by the statute are tables that the Internal Revenue Service prepares for determining taxpayers' ability to pay overdue taxes. These tables list standardized expense amounts for basic necessities. As incorporated in Chapter 13, the tables, therefore, determine the categories of expenses for which debtors can receive income allowances and the dollar amounts of those allowances. The IRS also prepares the Collection Financial Standards, which are supplemental guidelines that describe how to use the National and Local Standards tables and what the amounts listed in them mean.

Included in the National Standards at the time the case was brought were allowances for transportation costs, divided for car owners into tables labeled "Ownership Costs" and "Operating Costs." The Collection Financial Standards explained that "Ownership Costs" represented "nationwide figures for monthly loan or lease payments," "base[d] . . . on the five-year average of new and used car financing data compiled by the Federal Reserve Board." The Collection Financial Standards further instructed that, in the tax-collection context, "[i]f a taxpayer has no car payment, . . . only the operating costs portion of the transportation standard is used to come up with the allowable transportation expense."

=== Lower court proceedings ===
Jason M. Ransom filed for Chapter 13 bankruptcy in July 2006 and itemized over $82,500 in unsecured credit card debt, including nearly $33,000 held by MBNA (later FIA). In his proposed five-year repayment plan, Ransom claimed the "Ownership Costs" allowance, fixed at the time at $471 per month for one car, for his 2004 Toyota Camry which he owned outright. Over the course of the plan, this allowance would amount to a total of about $28,000 withheld from creditors. MBNA objected on the basis that Ransom did not make loan or lease payments on the car and thus was not entitled to that cost allowance. The bankruptcy court agreed and denied confirmation of the plan.

Ransom appealed to the Ninth Circuit Bankruptcy Appellate Panel, which affirmed, ruling that the expense amount only becomes "applicable" within the meaning of the statute when the debtor actually has such an expense. The Ninth Circuit also affirmed, stating that "[a]n 'ownership cost' is not an 'expense'—either actual or applicable—if it does not exist, period."

The Ninth Circuit's judgment created a circuit split with the Fifth, Eight, and Seventh Circuits, which had all permitted debtors to take the Ownership Costs allowance regardless of whether they made lease or loan payments. Ransom petitioned to the Supreme Court for certiorari, which the Supreme Court granted on April 19, 2010 to resolve the circuit split.

== The Supreme Court's decision ==
=== Briefing and oral argument ===
Amicus curiae briefs were submitted by the federal government and by Yale Law School professor G. Eric Brunstad, Jr., in support of the respondent, MBNA/FIA, urging affirmance; and by the National Association of Consumer Bankruptcy Attorneys in support of the petitioner, Ransom, urging reversal.

Oral argument was held on Monday, October 4, 2010, the first day of the Court's 2010 term. In addition to the attorneys for the parties, the Acting Solicitor General was granted leave to participate as amicus curiae. Court observers focused on the newly appointed Justice Elena Kagan, in what was her first public task as a judge: she asked several questions that New York Times Supreme Court reporter Adam Liptak described as "crisp and pointed" and as displaying "mastery" of the difficult legal questions. Justice Antonin Scalia, known for his strict textualist jurisprudence, criticized the petitioner for not including in his appellate brief the statutory language that was at issue. Chief Justice John G. Roberts suggested that there was no good answer to the issue in the case, characterizing the parties' arguments as leading to equally "absurd" results.

=== Opinion of the Court ===
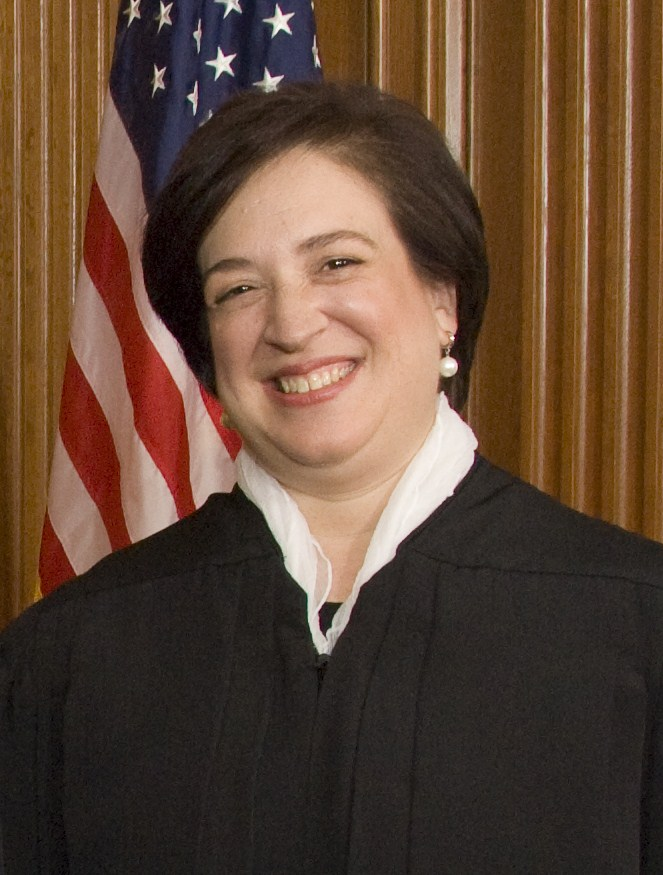
Newly appointed Justice Elena Kagan delivered the Court's opinion, her first as a judge.

The Supreme Court ruled 8-1 to affirm the Ninth Circuit's decision, in an opinion delivered by Justice Elena Kagan that was her first on the Court. All other justices joined the opinion except Justice Antonin Scalia, who filed a dissent.

The Court viewed the key word in the statute to be "applicable", in that the debtor may only claim "applicable" expense allowances listed in the Standards, not all expenses. As the statute did not define "applicable", the Court looked to its ordinary meaning, and determined that an expense allowance is "applicable" "only if the debtor has costs corresponding to the category covered by the table—that is, only if the debtor will incur that kind of expense during the life of the plan." This, in effect, requires courts to make a "threshold determination of eligibility" for the debtor regarding their claimed allowances.

In support of its interpretation, the Court explained that it ensured that the term "applicable" carried meaning, as every word in a statute should, to avoid the word being superfluous. It also comported with the statute's definition at 11 U.S.C. § 1325(b)(2) of "disposable income" as "current monthly income...less amounts reasonably necessary to be expended", because if a debtor won't actually have a particular kind of expense then an allowance to cover that cost is not "reasonably necessary." Finally, the Court viewed its interpretation as in furtherance of the objectives of BAPCPA, which was to ensure that debtors pay creditors the maximum amount they can afford.

To resolve the question of what kind of expense the "Ownership Costs" allowance covered, the Court turned to the Collection Financial Standards (CFS). Though the statute did not incorporate the CFS, the Court thought that, given that the National and Local Standards are created, revised, and applied by the IRS, "[t]he agency might, therefore, have something insightful and persuasive (albeit not controlling) to say about them." The Court accordingly declared that courts may consult the CFS in aid of interpreting the National and Local Standards so long as it is not contrary to the statutory language. Regarding the "Ownership Costs" table, the CFS explained that the dollar amounts derived from a five-year average of car financing data compiled by the Federal Reserve Board. The CFS further stated that only individuals who made such payments were eligible for that deduction. All other costs associated with owning a car, such as maintenance, insurance, and registration, were included in the "Operating Costs" allowance, which Ransom had also claimed. Because Ransom owned his car outright, the Court, therefore, concluded that he was not eligible for the "Ownership Costs" allowance.

=== Scalia's dissent ===
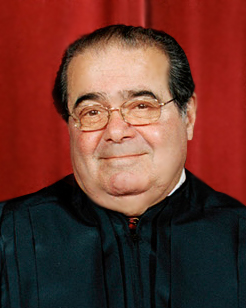
Justice Antonin Scalia, in his dissenting opinion, criticized the Court for relying on commentary authored by the Internal Revenue Service that the relevant statute did not incorporate.

Justice Antonin Scalia, in dissent, stated he would have held that a debtor who owns a car free and clear is still entitled to the car-ownership allowance. Scalia criticized the Court's reliance on the Collection Finance Standards, which, he pointed out, were not incorporated by the Bankruptcy Code and were not part of the Local Standards that the Code did incorporate. "In the present context," he wrote, "the real-world difference between finding the guidelines incorporated and finding it appropriate to consult them escapes me, since I can imagine no basis for consulting them unless Congress meant them to be consulted, which would mean they are incorporated." Scalia further observed that the CFS were compiled for a different purpose. "[T]he fact that portions of the Local Standards are to be disregarded for revenue-collection purposes says nothing about whether they are to be disregarded for purposes of Chapter 13 of the Bankruptcy Code."

Regarding the Court's argument that its interpretation of the word "applicable" was necessary to give the whole statute meaning, Scalia countered that "the canon against superfluity is not a canon against verbosity." In his view, the most reasonable meaning of the statutory language "according to the applicable provisions of the attached table" was simply "according to the attached table," and just because Congress used unnecessarily prolix language did not mean it was necessary for the Court to import extra meaning to the extra words. If Congress had intended the meaning the Court construed, Scalia thought it would have been "more natural [for the statute] to say 'monthly expense amounts specified under the National Standards and Local Standards, if applicable.'"

Though the Court seemed most concerned that a debtor without actual ownership costs would nevertheless be able to withhold income from repayment on that basis, Scalia believed that such an overallowance was inevitable with a standardized formula like the means test. "Our job, it seems to me, is not to eliminate or reduce those oddities, but to give the formula Congress adopted its fairest meaning."

== See also ==
- 2010 term United States Supreme Court opinions of Elena Kagan
- 2010 term United States Supreme Court opinions of Antonin Scalia
