= Elena Kagan =

American Supreme Court associate justice (born 1960)

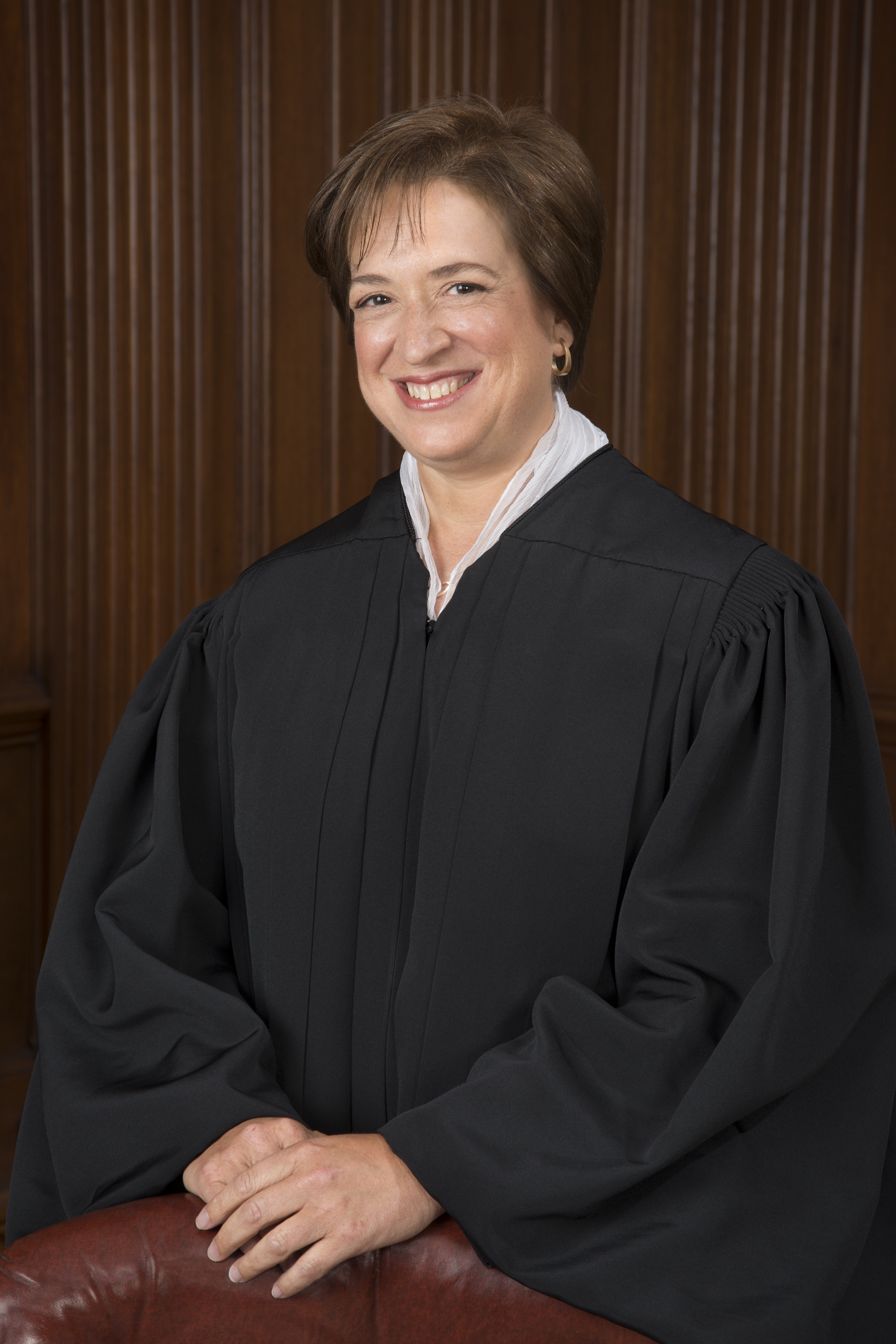
- Official portrait, 2013

Associate Justice of the Supreme Court of the United States
- Incumbent
- Assumed office August 7, 2010
- Appointed by: Barack Obama
- Preceded by: John Paul Stevens

45th Solicitor General of the United States
- In office March 19, 2009 – May 17, 2010
- President: Barack Obama
- Deputy: Neal Katyal
- Preceded by: Edwin Kneedler (acting)
- Succeeded by: Neal Katyal (acting)

11th Dean of Harvard Law School
- In office July 1, 2003 – March 19, 2009
- Preceded by: Robert Clark
- Succeeded by: Martha Minow

Deputy Director of the Domestic Policy Council
- In office 1997–2000
- President: Bill Clinton
- Preceded by: Jeremy Ben-Ami
- Succeeded by: Eric Liu

Personal details
- Born: April 28, 1960 (age 66) New York City, New York, U.S.
- Party: Democratic
- Education: Princeton University (BA); Worcester College, Oxford (MPhil); Harvard University (JD)
- Kagan's voice Kagan delivering the decision for Iancu v. Brunetti; Recorded June 24, 2019

Elena Kagan (/ˈkeɪɡən/ KAY-gən; born April 28, 1960) is an American lawyer who serves as an associate justice of the Supreme Court of the United States. She was appointed in 2010 by President Barack Obama and is the fourth woman to serve on the Court.

Kagan was born and raised in New York City. After graduating from Princeton University, Worcester College, Oxford, and Harvard Law School, she clerked for a federal Court of Appeals judge and for Supreme Court Justice Thurgood Marshall. She began her career as a professor at the University of Chicago Law School, leaving to serve as Associate White House Counsel, and later as a policy adviser under President Bill Clinton. After a nomination to the United States Court of Appeals for the D.C. Circuit, which expired without action, she became a professor at Harvard Law School and was later named its first female dean.

In 2009, Kagan became the first female solicitor general of the United States. The following year, President Obama nominated her to the Supreme Court to fill the vacancy arising from the impending retirement of Justice John Paul Stevens. The United States Senate confirmed her nomination by a vote of 63–37. As of 2022, she is the most recent justice appointed without any prior judicial experience. She favored a consensus-building approach until the conservative supermajority's decision to overturn Roe v. Wade. She has written the majority opinion in some landmark cases, such as Cooper v. Harris, Chiafalo v. Washington, and Kisor v. Wilkie, as well as several notable dissenting opinions, such as in Rucho v. Common Cause, West Virginia v. EPA, Brnovich v. DNC, Janus v. AFSCME, and Seila Law v. CFPB.

== Early life ==
Kagan was born on April 28, 1960, in Manhattan, the second of three children of Robert Kagan, an attorney who represented tenants trying to remain in their homes, and Gloria (Gittelman) Kagan, who taught at Hunter College Elementary School. Both her parents were the children of Russian Jewish immigrants. One of her grandfathers, Irving Louis Kagan, was born in Białystok and moved to Brooklyn in 1907. A grandmother of Kagan's, Esther Bokelman, moved with her family as a child from Russia to Philadelphia.

Kagan was raised in New York City. She has two brothers, Marc and Irving, both of whom became high school teachers. Marc taught New York City mayor Zohran Mamdani at the Bronx High School of Science, and was a member of his transition team.

Kagan and her family lived in a third-floor apartment at West End Avenue and 75th Street, and attended Lincoln Square Synagogue. She was independent and strong-willed in her youth and, according to a former law partner of her father's, clashed with her Orthodox rabbi, Shlomo Riskin, over aspects of her bat mitzvah. "She had strong opinions about what a bat mitzvah should be like, which didn't parallel the wishes of the rabbi," her father's colleague said. Kagan and Riskin negotiated a solution. Riskin had never performed a ritual bat mitzvah before. She "felt very strongly that there should be ritual bat mitzvah in the synagogue, no less important than the ritual bar mitzvah. This was really the first formal bat mitzvah we had", he said. Kagan asked to read from the Torah on a Saturday morning as the boys did, but ultimately read from the Book of Ruth on a Friday night. She now practices Conservative Judaism.

Kagan's childhood friend Margaret Raymond recalled that she was a teenage smoker but not a partier. On Saturday nights, Raymond and Kagan were "more apt to sit on the steps of the Metropolitan Museum of Art and talk." Kagan also loved literature and reread Jane Austen's Pride and Prejudice every year. In her 1977 Hunter College High School yearbook, she is pictured in a judge's robe and holding a gavel. Next to the photo is a quotation from former Supreme Court Justice Felix Frankfurter: "Government is itself an art, one of the subtlest of arts."

=== Education ===
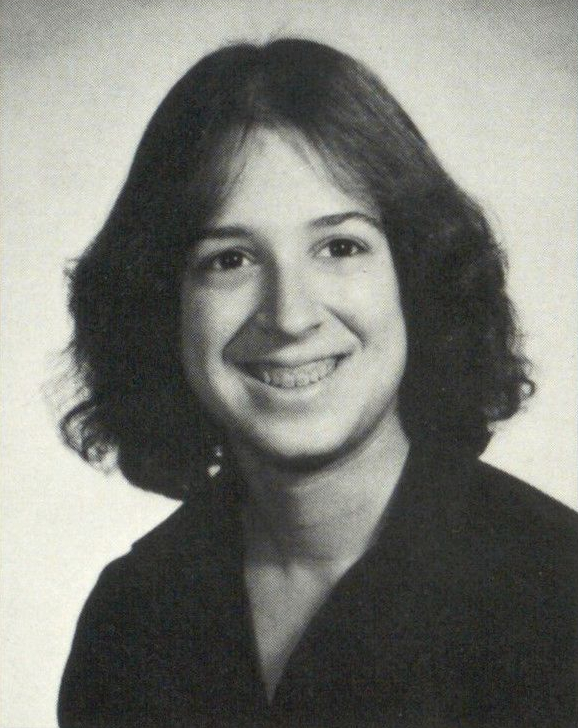
Kagan in the Princeton University yearbook, 1981

Kagan attended Hunter College High School, where her mother taught. The school had a reputation as one of the most elite learning institutions for high school girls and attracted students from all over New York City. Kagan emerged as one of the school's more outstanding students. She was elected president of the student government and served on a student-faculty consultative committee. Kagan then attended Princeton University, graduating in 1981 with a Bachelor of Arts, summa cum laude, in history. She was particularly drawn to American history and archival research. She wrote a senior thesis under historian Sean Wilentz titled "To the Final Conflict: Socialism in New York City, 1900–1933". In it she wrote, "Through its own internal feuding, then, the SP [Socialist Party] exhausted itself forever. The story is a sad but also a chastening one for those who, more than half a century after socialism's decline, still wish to change America." Wilentz says Kagan did not mean to defend socialism, noting that she "was interested in it. To study something is not to endorse it."

As an undergraduate, Kagan also served as editorial chair of The Daily Princetonian. Along with eight other students, (Note: Princeton student body president and future Governor of New York, Eliot Spitzer, was one of the other students.) she penned a "Declaration of the Campaign for a Democratic University". It called for "a fundamental restructuring of university governance" and condemned Princeton's administration for making decisions "behind closed doors". Despite the liberal tone of The Daily Princetonian's editorials, Kagan was politically restrained in her dealings with fellow reporters. Her Daily Princetonian colleague Steven Bernstein has said he "cannot recall a time in which Kagan expressed her political views". He described Kagan's political stances as "sort of liberal, democratic, progressive tradition, and everything with lower case".

In 1980, Kagan received Princeton's Daniel M. Sachs Class of 1960 Graduating Scholarship, (Note: Fellowship in memory of Rhodes Scholar from Princeton, Daniel M. Sachs.) one of the highest general awards the university confers. This enabled her to study at Worcester College, Oxford. As part of her graduation requirement, Kagan wrote a thesis called "The Development and Erosion of the American Exclusionary Rule: A Study in Judicial Method". It presented a critical look at the exclusionary rule and its evolution on the Supreme Court—the Warren Court, in particular. She earned a Master of Philosophy in politics at Oxford in 1983.

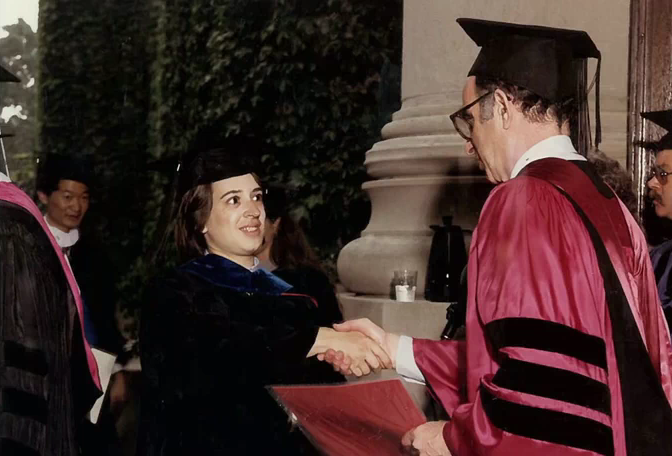
Kagan graduates from Harvard Law School, 1986

In 1983, at age 23, Kagan entered Harvard Law School. Her adjustment to Harvard's atmosphere was challenging—she received the worst grades of her entire law school career in her first semester. Kagan went on to earn an A in 17 of the 21 courses she took at Harvard, and she became a supervisory editor of the Harvard Law Review. She worked as a summer associate at the Wall Street law firm Fried, Frank, Harris, Shriver & Jacobson, where she worked in the litigation department. She graduated in 1986 with a Juris Doctor, magna cum laude. Her friend Jeffrey Toobin recalled that Kagan "stood out from the start as one with a formidable mind. She's good with people. At the time, the law school was a politically charged and divided place. She navigated the factions with ease, and won the respect of everyone."

== Career ==
=== Early career ===
After law school, Kagan was a law clerk for judge Abner J. Mikva of the U.S. Court of Appeals for the District of Columbia Circuit from 1986 to 1987. She became one of Mikva's favorite clerks; he called her "the pick of the litter". From 1987 to 1988, Kagan clerked for Justice Thurgood Marshall of the U.S. Supreme Court. Marshall said he hired Kagan to help him put the "spark" back into his opinions as the Court had been undergoing a conservative shift since William Rehnquist became Chief Justice in 1986. Marshall nicknamed the 5-foot-3-inch (1.60-metre) Kagan "Shorty".

From 1989 to 1991, Kagan was in private practice at the Washington, D.C., law firm Williams & Connolly. As a junior associate, she drafted briefs and conducted discovery. During her short time at the firm, she handled five lawsuits that involved First Amendment or media law issues and libel issues.

In 1991, Kagan became an assistant professor at the University of Chicago Law School. While there she first met Barack Obama, a guest lecturer at the school. While on the faculty there, Kagan published a law review article on the regulation of First Amendment hate speech in the wake of the Supreme Court's ruling in R.A.V. v. City of St. Paul; an article discussing the significance of governmental motive in regulating speech; and a review of a book by Stephen L. Carter discussing the judicial confirmation process. In the first article, which became highly influential, Kagan argued that the Supreme Court should examine governmental motives when deciding First Amendment cases and analyzed historic draft-card burning and flag burning cases in light of free speech arguments.

In 1993, Senator Joe Biden appointed Kagan as a special counsel for the Senate Judiciary Committee. During this time, she worked on Ruth Bader Ginsburg's Supreme Court confirmation hearings.

Kagan became a tenured professor of law in 1995. According to her colleagues, Kagan's students complimented and admired her from the beginning, and she was granted tenure "despite the reservations of some colleagues who thought she had not published enough".

=== Clinton administration ===
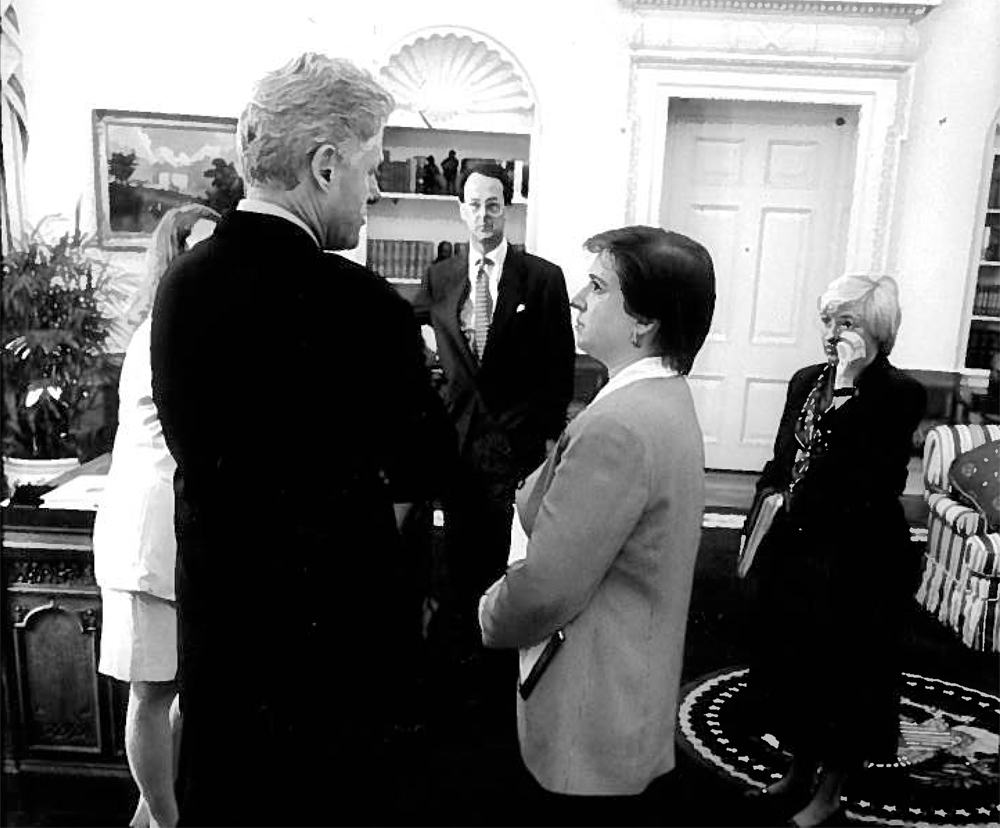
Kagan in the Oval Office with President Bill Clinton in 1997 during her tenure as Deputy Assistant to the President for Domestic Policy

Kagan served as Associate White House Counsel for Bill Clinton from 1995 to 1996, when Mikva served as White House Counsel. She worked on such issues affecting the Clinton administration as the Whitewater controversy, the White House travel office controversy, and Clinton v. Jones. From 1997 to 1999, she worked as Deputy Assistant to the President for Domestic Policy and deputy director of the Domestic Policy Council. Kagan worked on topics like budget appropriations, campaign finance reform, and social welfare issues. Her work is catalogued in the Clinton Library. Kagan coauthored a 1997 memo urging Clinton to support a ban on late-term abortions: "We recommend that you endorse the Daschle amendment in order to sustain your credibility on HR 1122 and prevent Congress from overriding your veto."

On June 17, 1999, Clinton nominated Kagan to the U.S. Court of Appeals for the District of Columbia Circuit, to replace James L. Buckley, who took senior status in 1996. The Senate Judiciary Committee's Republican Chairman, Orrin Hatch, scheduled no hearing, effectively ending her nomination. When the Senate term ended, her nomination lapsed, as did that of fellow Clinton nominee Allen Snyder.

=== Academia ===
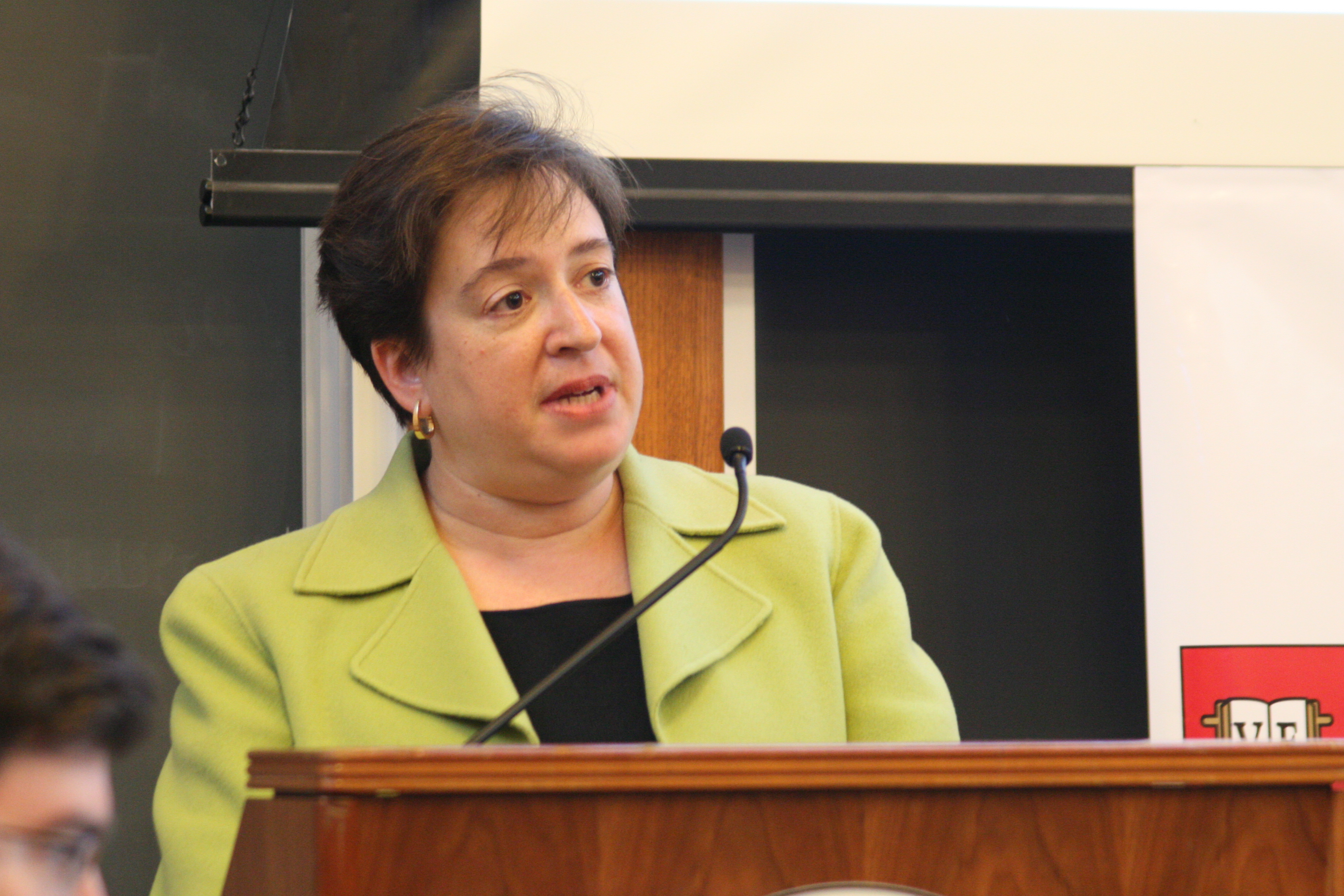
Kagan as Harvard Law School dean in 2008

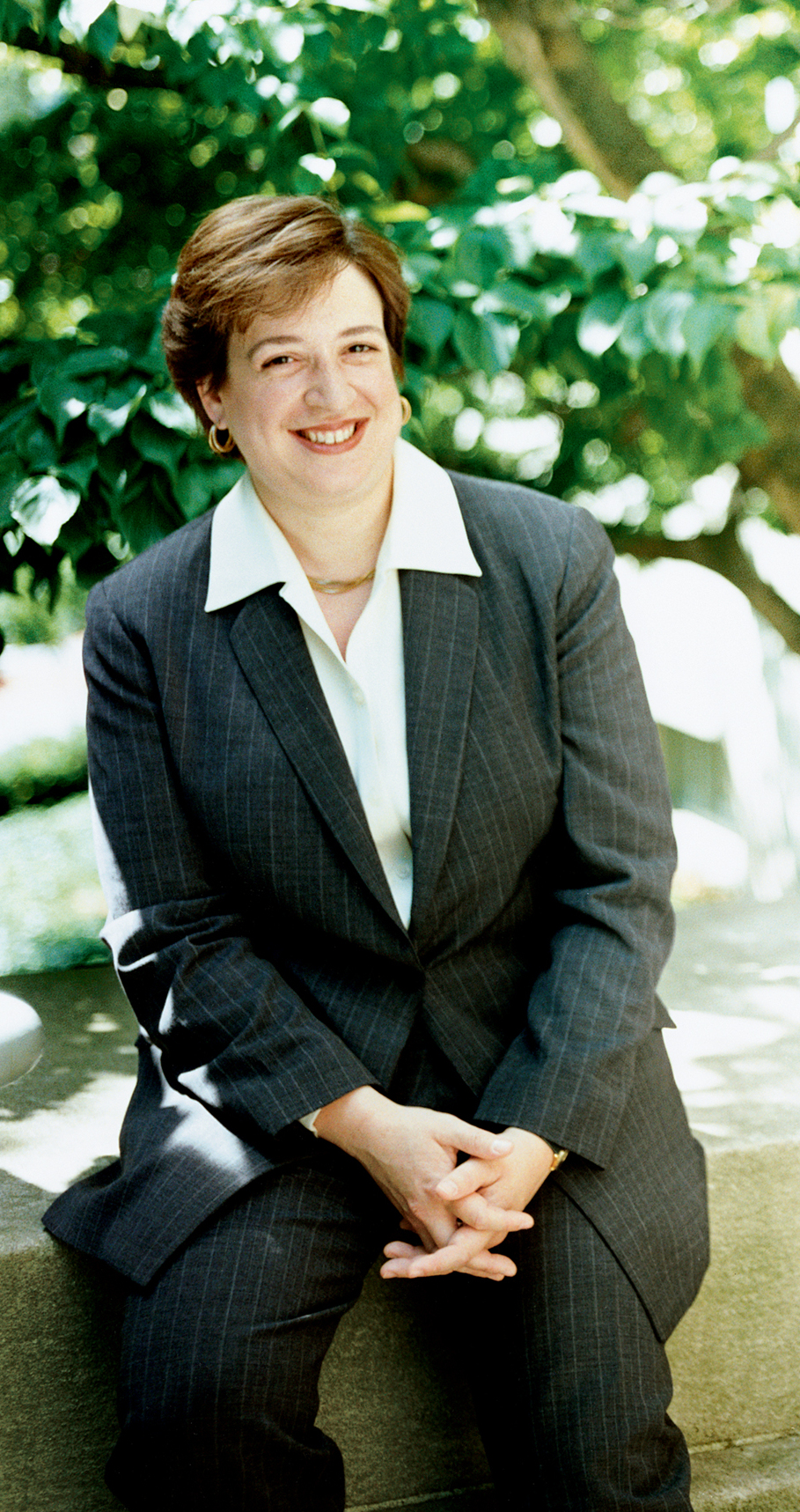
Kagan's 2009 official portrait as Harvard Law School dean

After her service in the White House and her lapsed judicial nomination, Kagan returned to academia in 1999. She initially sought to return to the University of Chicago, but she had given up her tenured position during her extended stint in the Clinton Administration, and the school chose not to rehire her, reportedly due to doubts about her commitment to academia. Kagan quickly found a position as a visiting professor at Harvard Law School. While there, she authored a law review article on United States administrative law, focusing on the president's role in formulating and influencing federal administrative law. The article was honored as the year's top scholarly article by the American Bar Association's Section on Administrative Law and Regulatory Practice.

In 2001, Kagan was named a full professor at Harvard Law School and in 2003 she was named dean of the Law School by Harvard University President Lawrence Summers. She succeeded Robert C. Clark, who had served as dean for over a decade. The focus of her tenure was on improving student satisfaction. Efforts included constructing new facilities and reforming the first-year curriculum as well as aesthetic changes and creature comforts, such as free morning coffee. She has been credited for a consensus-building leadership style that defused the school's previous ideological discord.

As dean, Kagan inherited a $400 million capital campaign, "Setting the Standard," in 2003. It ended in 2008 with a record-breaking $476 million raised, 19% more than the original goal. Kagan made a number of prominent new hires, increasing the size of the faculty considerably. Her coups included hiring legal scholar Cass Sunstein away from the University of Chicago and Lawrence Lessig away from Stanford. She also made an effort to hire conservative scholars, such as former Bush administration official Jack Goldsmith, for the traditionally liberal-leaning faculty.

According to Kevin Washburn, then dean of the University of New Mexico School of Law, Kagan transformed Harvard Law School from a harsh environment for students to one that was much more student-focused.

During her deanship, Kagan upheld a decades-old policy barring military recruiters from the Office of Career Services because she felt the military's "Don't Ask, Don't Tell" policy discriminated against gays and lesbians. According to Campus Progress,

As dean, Kagan supported a lawsuit intended to overturn the Solomon Amendment so military recruiters might be banned from the grounds of schools like Harvard. When a federal appeals court ruled The Pentagon could not withhold funds, she banned the military from Harvard's campus once again. The case was challenged in the Supreme Court, which ruled the military could indeed require schools to allow recruiters if they wanted to receive federal money. Kagan, though she allowed the military back, simultaneously urged students to demonstrate against Don't Ask, Don't Tell.

In October 2003, Kagan sent an email to students and faculty deploring that military recruiters had shown up on campus in violation of this policy. The email read in part, "This action causes me deep distress. I abhor the military's discriminatory recruitment policy". She also wrote that it was "a profound wrong—a moral injustice of the first order".

From 2005 to 2008, Kagan was a member of the Research Advisory Council of the Goldman Sachs Global Markets Institute. She received a $10,000 stipend for her service.

By early 2007, Kagan was a finalist for the presidency of Harvard University after Lawrence Summers's resignation the previous year. The position ultimately went to Drew Gilpin Faust instead. Kagan was reportedly disappointed, and law school students threw her a party to express their appreciation for her leadership.

=== Solicitor General ===
On January 5, 2009, President-elect Barack Obama announced he would nominate Kagan to be Solicitor General. She was vetted for the position of Deputy Attorney General before her selection as Solicitor General. At the time of her nomination, Kagan had never argued a case before any court. At least two previous solicitors general, Robert Bork and Kenneth Starr, had no previous Supreme Court appearances.

The two main questions senators had for Kagan during her confirmation hearings were whether she would defend statutes that she personally opposed and whether she was qualified to be Solicitor General given her lack of courtroom experience. Kagan testified that she would defend laws, such as the Defense of Marriage Act, pursuant to which states were not required to recognize same-sex marriages originating in other states, "if there is any reasonable basis to do so". The Senate confirmed her on March 19, 2009, by a vote of 61 to 31. She was the first woman to hold the position. Upon taking office, Kagan pledged to defend any statute as long as there was a colorable argument to be made, regardless of her personal opinions. As Solicitor General, Kagan's job was to act as the lawyer for the United States and defend legislation and executive actions in appeals before the Supreme Court. Thus the arguments she made as Solicitor General were not necessarily indicative of her personal beliefs.

Kagan's first appearance before the Supreme Court was on September 9, 2009, one month before the typical start of a new term in October, in the re-argument of Citizens United v. Federal Election Commission, 558 U.S. 310 (2010). During argument, she asked the Court to uphold a 1990 precedent that allowed the government to restrict corporations' use of their treasuries to campaign for or against political candidates. As an alternative argument, Kagan further contended that if the Court would not uphold precedent, it should keep its ruling narrowly focused on corporations that resembled the petitioning organization, Citizens United, rather than reconsidering the constitutionality of broader restrictions on corporate campaign finance. In a 5–4 decision, the Court overturned precedent and allowed corporations to spend freely in elections, a major defeat for the Obama administration.

During her 15 months as Solicitor General, Kagan argued six cases before the Supreme Court. The Washington Post described her style during argument as "confident" and "conversational". She helped win four cases: Salazar v. Buono, 559 U.S. 700 (2010), United States v. Comstock, 560 U.S. 126 (2010), Holder v. Humanitarian Law Project, 561 U.S. 1 (2010), and Free Enterprise Fund v. Public Company Accounting Oversight Board, 561 U.S. 477 (2010). (Note: In addition to Citizens' United and the four cases she won, the final case she argued as Solicitor General, Robertson v. United States ex rel. Watson, 560 U.S. 272 (2010) was later dismissed in a per curiam opinion.)

== Supreme Court ==
=== Nomination ===
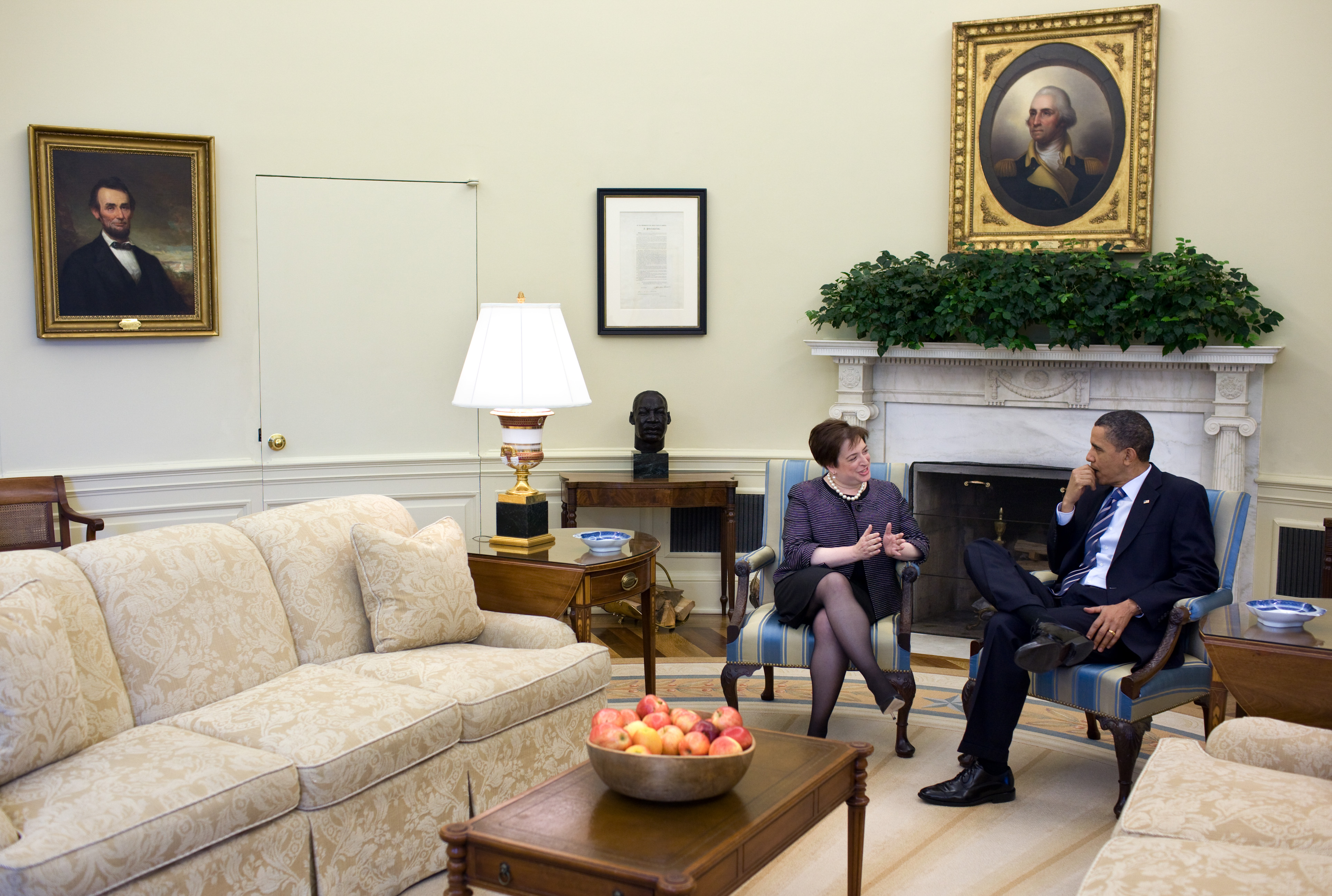
Kagan meets with then President Obama in the Oval Office in April 2010, a month before nominating her to the U.S. Supreme Court.

Obama nominates Kagan to be an Associate Justice for the United States Supreme Court.

Before Obama's election, Kagan was the subject of media speculation as a potential Supreme Court nominee if a Democratic president were elected in 2008. Obama had his first Supreme Court vacancy to fill in 2009 when Associate Justice David Souter announced his upcoming retirement. Senior Obama adviser David Axelrod later recounted that during the search for a new justice, Antonin Scalia told him he hoped Obama would nominate Kagan, because of her intelligence. On May 13, 2009, the Associated Press reported that Obama was considering Kagan, among others. On May 26, 2009, Obama announced that he had chosen Sonia Sotomayor.

On April 9, 2010, Justice John Paul Stevens announced he would retire at the start of the Court's summer 2010 recess, triggering new speculation about potential replacements, and Kagan was once again considered a contender. In a Fresh Dialogues interview, Jeffrey Toobin, a Supreme Court analyst and Kagan's friend and law school classmate, speculated that she would be Obama's nominee, describing her as "very much an Obama-type person, a moderate Democrat, a consensus builder". This alarmed some liberals and progressives, who worried that "replacing Stevens with Kagan risks moving the Court to the right, perhaps substantially to the right".

On May 10, 2010, Obama nominated Kagan to the Supreme Court. The deans of over one-third of the country's law schools, 69 people in total, endorsed the nomination in an open letter in early June. It lauded what it called her coalition-building skills and "understanding of both doctrine and policy" as well as her written record of legal analysis.

=== Confirmation hearings ===
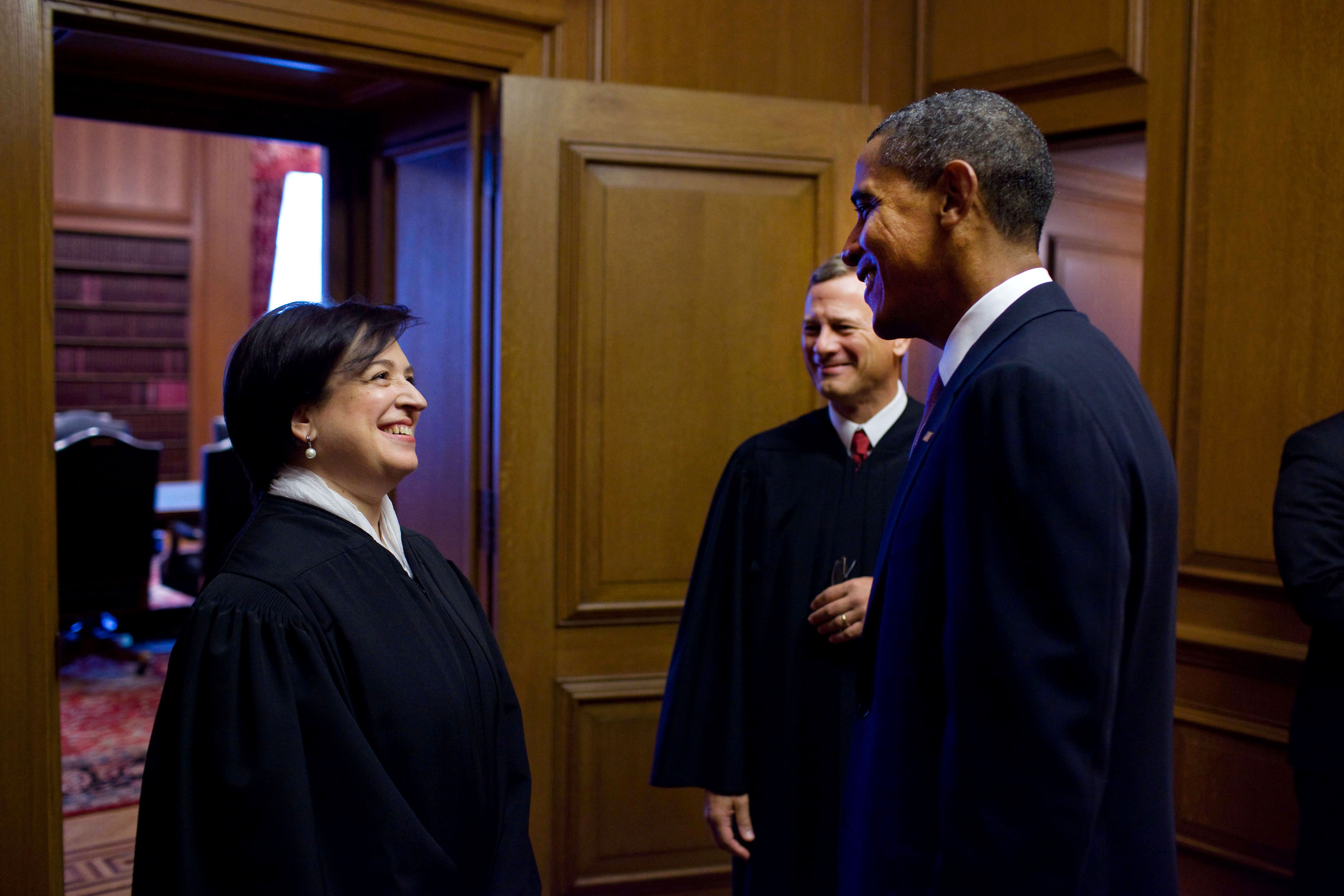
Kagan, Obama, and Chief Justice John Roberts before her investiture ceremony, October 1, 2010

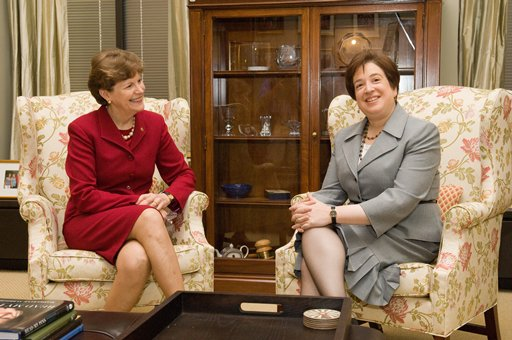
Kagan (right), then a Supreme Court nominee, meets with U.S. Senator Jeanne Shaheen.

Kagan's confirmation hearings before the Senate Judiciary Committee began on June 28. As they began, Kagan was expected to be confirmed, with Senator John Cornyn calling her "justice-to-be". During the hearings, she demonstrated a deep knowledge of Supreme Court cases, expounding upon cases senators mentioned in their questions to her without taking notes on the questions. A number of Democratic senators criticized recent decisions of the court as "activist", but Kagan avoided joining in their criticisms. Like many prior nominees, including Chief Justice John Roberts, she declined to answer whether she thought particular cases were correctly decided or how she would vote on particular issues. Senators Jon Kyl and Arlen Specter (Note: Specter was first elected to the Senate as a Republican. He changed parties in 2009 but lost the Democratic primary for his seat in May 2010.) criticized her evasiveness. Specter said it obscured the way justices actually ruled once on the Court. He noted that Kagan published an article in the University of Chicago Law Review in 1995 in which she criticized the evasiveness she came to practice. Republican senators criticized Kagan's background as more political than judicial; she responded by promising to be impartial and fair. On July 20, 2010, the Senate Judiciary Committee voted 13–6 to recommend Kagan's confirmation to the full Senate. On August 5 the full Senate confirmed her nomination by a vote of 63–37. The voting was largely along party lines, with five Republicans (Richard Lugar, Judd Gregg, Lindsey Graham, Susan Collins, and Olympia Snowe) supporting her and one Democrat (Ben Nelson) opposing.

Kagan's swearing-in ceremony took place on August 7, 2010, at the White House. Chief Justice John Roberts administered the prescribed constitutional and judicial oaths of office, at which time she became the 112th justice (100th associate justice) of the Supreme Court. She is the first person appointed to the Court without any prior experience as a judge since William Rehnquist and Lewis F. Powell Jr., who both became members in 1972. She is the fourth female justice in the court's history, (Note: For the first time, the Court had three sitting female justices: Kagan, Ginsburg, and Sotomayor.) and the eighth Jewish justice. (Note: Kagan's confirmation brought the number of sitting Jewish justices to three.)

=== Early cases ===
Because of her service as solicitor general, Kagan recused herself from 28 out of the 78 cases heard during her first year on the Court to avoid conflicts of interest. She recused herself again, due to similar conflicts of interests, in the 2017 immigrant-detention case Jennings v. Rodriguez, as she had authorized a filing in the case as solicitor general.

Kagan's first opinion as a justice, Ransom v. FIA Card Services, was in a statutory interpretation case. The issue was what income a debtor could shield from creditors in bankruptcy. In an 8–1 decision, Kagan's opinion for the majority held that the Chapter 13 Bankruptcy statute prevents a debtor from taking an allowance for car-related expenses where the debtor owns the car outright and does not make loan or lease payments. She reasoned the word "applicable" was key to the statute, and debtors could only take allowances for car-related costs that applied to them.

=== First Amendment ===
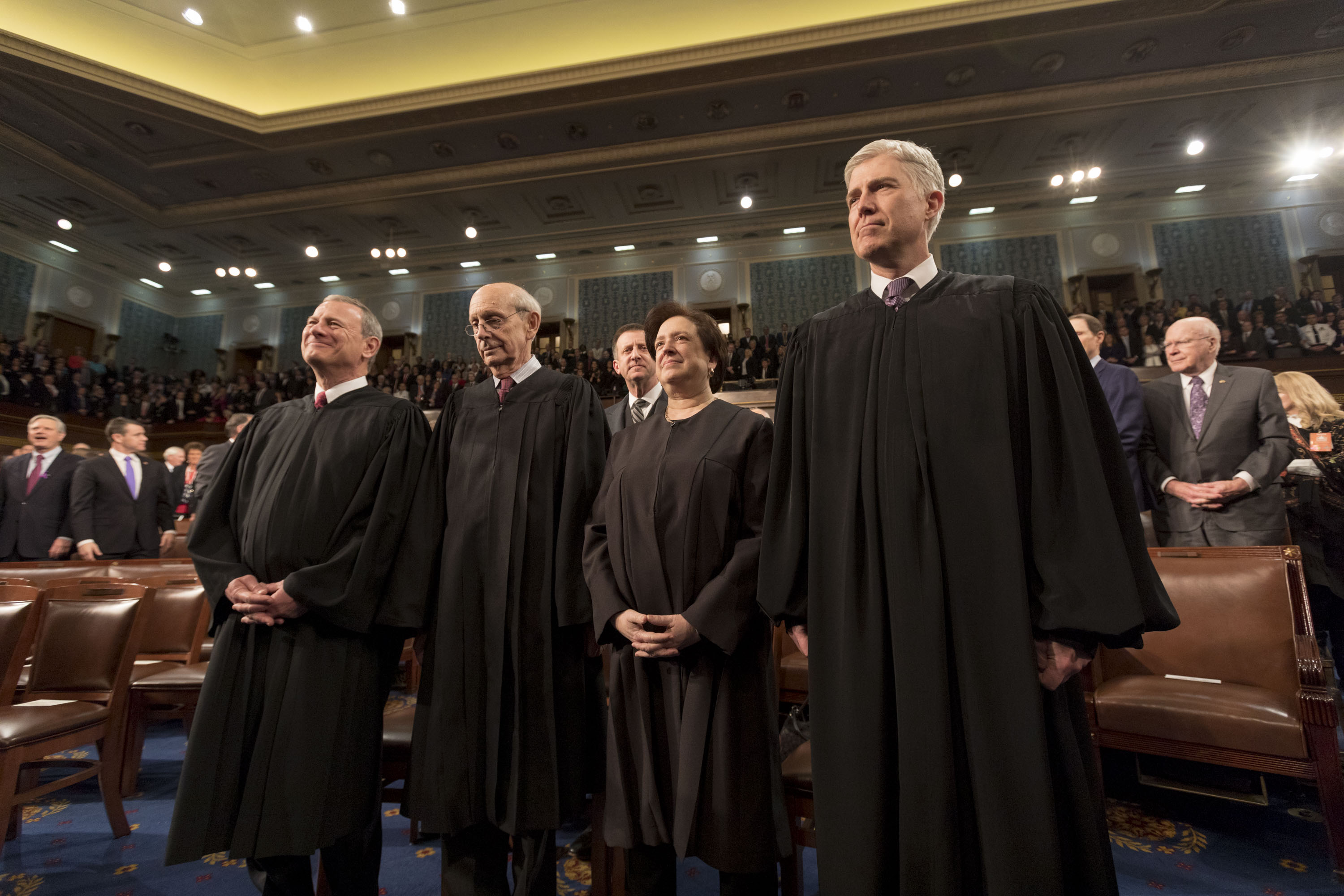
John Roberts, Stephen Breyer, Kagan, and Neil Gorsuch at President Donald Trump's 2018 State of the Union Address

Kagan's first dissent came in a First Amendment case, Arizona Christian School Tuition Organization v. Winn, 563 U.S. 125 (2011). Writing for the Court's liberal wing, she objected to the majority's creating an exception to the Establishment Clause of the First Amendment. The majority held that Arizona taxpayers cannot challenge tax credits for those who donate to groups that provide scholarships to religious schools, drawing a distinction between the way the Court treats tax credits and grants. Kagan deemed this distinction "arbitrary" because tax credits and grants can be used to achieve the same objectives. She viewed the majority's decision as creating a loophole for governments to fund religion. In another Establishment Clause case, Town of Greece v. Galloway, 572 U.S. 565 (2014), Kagan wrote a dissent arguing that a prayer at a town council meeting failed to treat all Americans the same regardless of religion. Greece involved a town in New York inviting chaplains, for several years all Christian, to give a prayer before town council meetings. Unlike Marsh v. Chambers, 463 U.S. 783 (1983), in which the Supreme Court allowed a state legislature to open with a prayer, Kagan noted the board in Greece was a forum for ordinary citizens. She argued the use of prayer showed a preference for a particular religion and thus violated Americans' First Amendment rights.

=== Sixth Amendment ===
Kagan dissented in Luis v. United States, 578 U.S. ___ (2016), where the five-justice majority held that the pretrial freezing of untainted assets not traced back to criminal activity was a violation of a defendant's Sixth Amendment right to counsel when those assets were needed to retain counsel of the defendant's choosing. The defendant, Sila Luis, had been charged with Medicare fraud, in which prosecutors alleged he illegally charged $45 million for unneeded services. The prosecutors asked a judge to freeze $2 million of Luis's assets, which Luis said she needed to pay legal bills, after she had already spent most of the $45 million she made from the alleged scheme. An earlier Supreme Court case, United States v. Monsanto, 491 U.S. 600 (1989), held that a court could freeze a defendant's assets pretrial, including funds obtained through the alleged sale of drugs, even when those assets were being used to hire an attorney. The majority sought to distinguish their holding in Luis from Monsanto based upon the nature of the funds being frozen; Luis's funds were not directly linked to her crime and Monsanto's funds were. Kennedy dissented in Luis because he did not think criminal defendants should be treated differently based on how quickly they spent their illegal proceeds. Kagan agreed with Kennedy that the Court's decision created inequity and drew an arbitrary distinction, but further opined that Monsanto might have been wrongly decided. She suggested she would be willing to overturn such precedent in the future, but declined to do so in the case at bar because Luis had not sought that relief. Her vote thus rested on procedural grounds as she expressed skepticism that the government should be able to freeze the assets of a criminal defendant not yet convicted, and thus still benefiting from the presumption of innocence, by merely showing probable cause that the property will be subject to forfeiture.

=== Gerrymandering ===
Kagan wrote for the majority in Cooper v. Harris, 581 U.S. ___ (2017), striking down the configuration of two of North Carolina's congressional districts. The Court held the districts' boundaries were unconstitutional because they relied excessively on race and did not pass the strict scrutiny standard of review. In a footnote, Kagan set forth a new principle, that congressional districts drawn with race as the dominant factor may be found to be an unlawful racial gerrymander even if they have another goal, such as sorting voters by political affiliation. Applying this principle to the facts of the case, the Court unanimously struck down North Carolina's District 1, where state lawmakers had increased the state's black voting-age population by 4.1% even though the black population had already been able to elect preferred candidates before the district lines were redrawn. The increase of black voters in District 1 resulted in a decrease of black voters in other districts. The Court also struck down District 12 by a vote of 5–3 for similar shifts in its racial composition. The dissent argued that those challenging the validity of the district had not proved that race caused the change in District 12. Kagan quoted Court precedent that race must only be a predominant consideration, and that challengers did not need to prove politics was not a motivating factor.

In June 2019, Kagan dissented in Rucho v. Common Cause, a 5–4 ruling that held that partisan gerrymandering is a non-justiciable claim. Kagan wrote, "Of all times to abandon the Court's duty to declare the law, this was not the one. The practices challenged in these cases imperil our system of government. Part of the Court's role in that system is to defend its foundations. None is more important than free and fair elections. With respect but deep sadness, I dissent." Ginsburg, Breyer, and Sotomayor joined her dissent.

In Louisiana v. Callais in April 2026, Kagan wrote the dissent, and Sotomayor and Ketanji Brown Jackson signed on to it. She warned that the ruling's consequences would be "far-reaching and grave" and that it left Section 2 "all but a dead letter". Kagan called the Voting Rights Act "one of the most consequential, efficacious, and amply justified exercises of federal legislative power in our Nation's history", and wrote that it grew out of the "literal blood of Union soldiers and civil rights marchers", bringing the country closer to its ideals of democracy and racial equality. In her view, the majority had effectively brought back the intent-based test from Mobile v. Bolden, which Congress rejected when it passed its 1982 amendments to the VRA. She argued that this made vote dilution claims close to impossible to win, and that only Congress can decide whether the VRA is still needed.

=== Voting rights ===
In Brnovich v. DNC, Kagan wrote the dissenting opinion and was joined by Breyer and Sotomayor. She would have struck down the Arizona voting laws that throw out votes that are cast out-of-precinct and ban ballot harvesting. Kagan wrote that African-American, Latino, and Native American voters are disproportionately likely to have their votes thrown out for being out-of-precinct (compared to White voters). She concluded, "The law that confronted one of this country’s most enduring wrongs; pledged to give every American, of every race, an equal chance to participate in our democracy; and now stands as the crucial tool to achieve that goal. That law, of all laws, deserves the sweep and power Congress gave it. That law, of all laws, should not be diminished by this Court."

=== Environment ===
Joined by Justices Breyer and Sotomayor, Kagan dissented in West Virginia v. EPA, which struck down the proposed Clean Power Plan. She wrote, "It is EPA (that's the Environmental Protection Agency, in case the majority forgot) acting to address the greatest environmental challenge of our time. So too, there is nothing special about the Plan's 'who': fossil-fuel-fired power plants. In Utility Air, we thought EPA's regulation of churches and schools highly unusual. But fossil-fuel-fired plants? Those plants pollute—a lot—and so they have long lived under the watchful eye of EPA. That was true even before EPA began regulating carbon dioxide." Kagan concluded, "The subject matter of the regulation here makes the Court's intervention all the more troubling. Whatever else this Court may know about, it does not have a clue about how to address climate change. And let's say the obvious: The stakes here are high. Yet the Court today prevents congressionally authorized agency action to curb power plants' carbon dioxide emissions. The Court appoints itself—instead of Congress or the expert agency—the decision-maker on climate policy. I cannot think of many things more frightening. Respectfully, I dissent."

== Writing style ==
In her first term on the Court, Kagan did not write any separate opinions, and wrote the fewest opinions of any justice. She wrote only majority opinions or dissents that more senior justices assigned to her, and in which she and a group of justices agreed upon a rationale for deciding the case. This tendency to write for a group rather than herself made it difficult to discern her own views or where she might lean in future cases. She wrote the fewest opinions for the terms from 2011 through 2014, tying with Kennedy in 2011 and 2013.

Kagan's writing has been characterized as conversational, employing a range of rhetorical styles. She has said that she approaches writing on the Court like she used to approach the classroom, with numerous strategies to engage the reader. Her opinions use examples and analogies to make them more accessible to a broad audience. In one such opinion, Kagan wrote for the majority in Kimble v. Marvel Entertainment, LLC, a 6–3 decision in favor of Marvel, holding that a patentee cannot receive royalties after the patent expires. In doing so, she included several references to Spider-Man.

== Jurisprudence ==
Kagan is generally regarded as a centrist. After her nomination to the Court, White House officials, worried she would be seen as too centrist by liberals, called her a "pragmatic progressive". On the Court, she favored a consensus-building approach until the conservative supermajority's decision to overturn Roe v. Wade. After Dobbs v. Jackson Women's Health Organization she became publicly critical of the Court's rightward shift. She voted with the liberal bloc in King v. Burwell, 576 U.S. 988 (2015), finding that Obamacare's subsidies and individual mandate are constitutional, and in Obergefell v. Hodges, 576 U.S. 644 (2015), which prohibits states from banning same-sex marriage. In 2018, Slate observed that Kagan had crossed ideological lines on multiple cases during the preceding term, and considered her part of a centrist bloc, along with Roberts, Stephen Breyer, and Anthony Kennedy. Still, FiveThirtyEight observed that Kagan voted with her more liberal peers, Ginsburg and Sotomayor, over 90% of the time. Also during the 2017–18 term, Kagan most commonly agreed with Breyer; they voted together in 93% of cases. She agreed least often with Samuel Alito, in 58.82% of cases.

Kagan was the circuit justice, the justice responsible for handling emergency requests, for the Sixth and Seventh Circuits. After Brett Kavanaugh's confirmation, she was assigned to the Ninth Circuit, the largest circuit court by area. It includes Alaska, Arizona, California, Guam, Hawaii, Idaho, Oregon, Montana, Nevada, the Northern Mariana Islands, and Washington state.

== Other activities ==
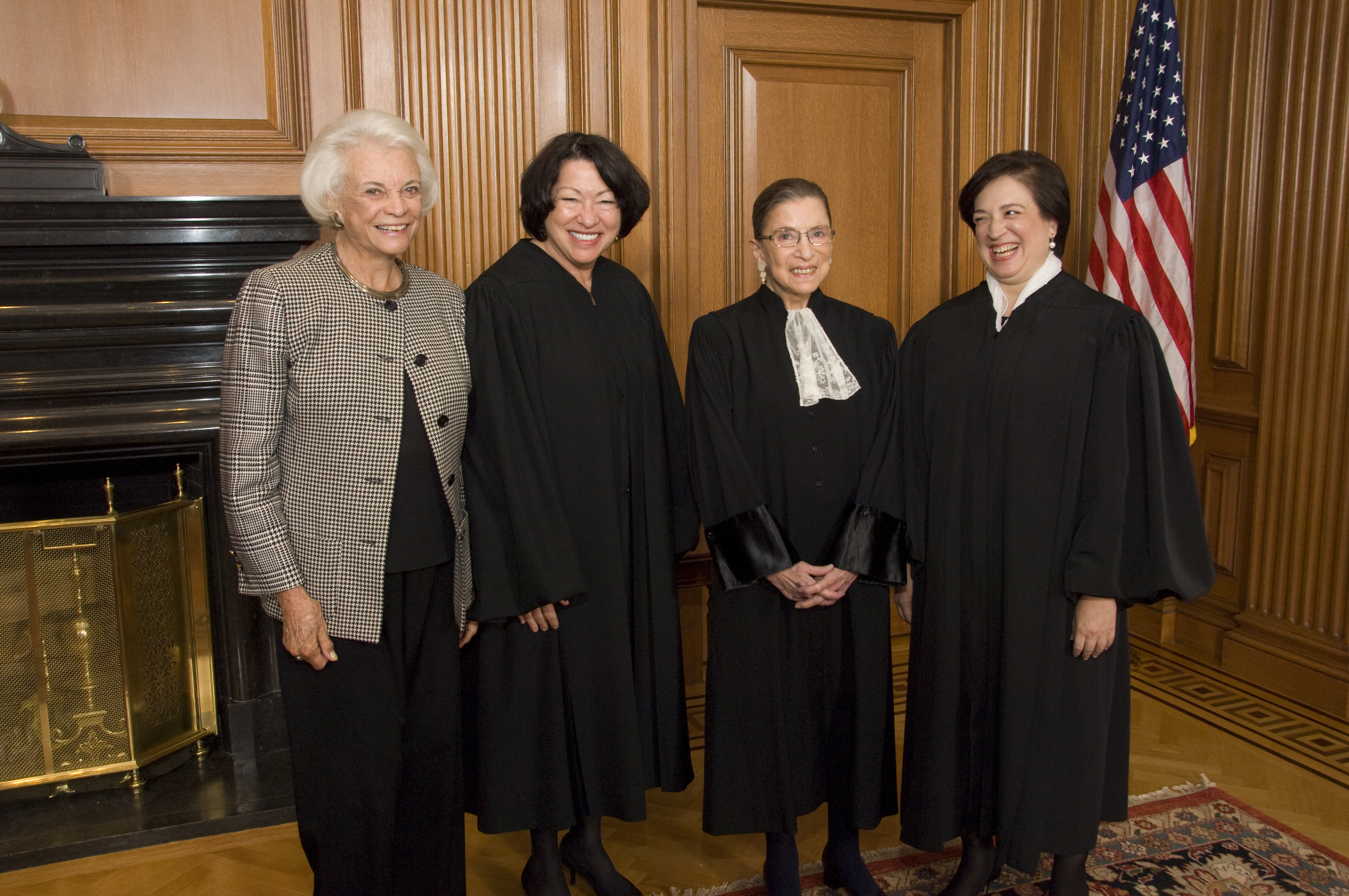
The first four female U.S. Supreme Court justices: Sandra Day O'Connor, Sonia Sotomayor, Ruth Bader Ginsburg, and Kagan, October 2010. (O'Connor is not wearing a robe because she had retired before the picture was taken.)

Like other justices, Kagan makes public appearances when she is not hearing cases. In her first four years on the Court, she made at least 20 public appearances. Kagan tends to choose speaking engagements that allow her to speak to students.

Time magazine named Kagan one of its Time 100 most influential people for 2013. Former Supreme Court Justice Sandra Day O'Connor wrote the article on Kagan, calling her "an incisive legal thinker" and "excellent communicator". That same year, a painting of the four women to have served as Supreme Court justices, Kagan, Sotomayor, Ginsburg, and O'Connor, was unveiled at the National Portrait Gallery in Washington, D.C. In 2018, Kagan received the Marshall-Wythe Medallion from William & Mary Law School, and an honorary degree of Doctor of Humane Letters from Hunter College.

== Personal life ==
Kagan has never married. During her confirmation, a photo of her playing softball, which is sometimes characterized in popular culture as unfeminine, led to unsubstantiated claims that Kagan was a lesbian. Her friends have criticized the rumors. Kagan's law school roommate Sarah Walzer said, "I've known her for most of her adult life and I know she's straight."

Kagan's Harvard colleagues and friends have characterized her as a good conversationalist, warm, with a good sense of humor. Before joining the Supreme Court, she was known to play poker and smoke cigars.

Early in her tenure as a justice, Kagan began socializing with several of her new colleagues. She attended the opera with Ruth Bader Ginsburg, had dinner with Sonia Sotomayor, attended legal events with Anthony Kennedy and Clarence Thomas, and went hunting with Antonin Scalia. The hunting trips stemmed from a promise Kagan made to U.S. senator Jim Risch of Idaho during a meeting before her confirmation; Risch expressed concern that, as a New York City native, Kagan did not understand the importance of hunting to his constituents. Kagan initially offered to go hunting with Risch before promising instead to go hunting with Scalia if confirmed. According to Kagan, Scalia laughed when she told him of the promise and took her to his hunting club for the first of several hunting trips. Kagan is known to spend time with longtime friends from law school and from her stint in the Clinton administration rather than attending Washington, D.C. social events she is invited to as a justice.

== Selected scholarly works ==
- Kagan, Elena (1992). "The Changing Faces of First Amendment Neutrality: R.A.V. v. St. Paul, Rust v. Sullivan, and the Problem of Content-Based Underinclusion". Supreme Court Review. 1992: 29–77. doi:10.1086/scr.1992.3109667.
- — (1993). "Regulation of Hate Speech and Pornography After R.A.V.". University of Chicago Law Review. 60 (3/4): 873–902. doi:10.2307/1600159. JSTOR 1600159.
- — (1995). "Confirmation Messes, Old and New". University of Chicago Law Review. 62 (2): 919–42. doi:10.2307/1600153. JSTOR 1600153.
- — (1996). "Private Speech, Public Purpose: The Role of Governmental Motive in First Amendment Doctrine". University of Chicago Law Review. 63 (2): 413–517. doi:10.2307/1600235. JSTOR 1600235.
- — (2001). "Presidential Administration". Harvard Law Review. 114 (8): 2245–2385. doi:10.2307/1342513. JSTOR 1342513.
- —; Barron, David J. (2001). "Chevron's Nondelegation Doctrine". Supreme Court Review. 2001: 201–65. doi:10.1086/scr.2001.3109689.

== See also ==
- Barack Obama Supreme Court candidates
- Bill Clinton judicial appointment controversies
- Demographics of the Supreme Court of the United States
- List of Jewish American jurists
- List of law clerks for the fourth seat of the Supreme Court of the United States
- List of law clerks for the tenth seat of the Supreme Court of the United States

== Sources ==
Academic offices
Preceded by Robert C. Clark	Dean of Harvard Law School; 2003–2009	Succeeded by Martha Minow
Legal offices
Preceded by Edwin Kneedler; Acting	Solicitor General of the United States; 2009–2010	Succeeded by Neal Katyal; Acting
Preceded by John Paul Stevens	Associate Justice of the Supreme Court of the United States; 2010–present	Incumbent
U.S. order of precedence (ceremonial)
Preceded by Sonia Sotomayor	Order of precedence of the United States as Associate Justice of the Supreme Court	Succeeded by Neil Gorsuch
