= Chapter 12, Title 11, United States Code =

Chapter 12 of Title 11 of the United States Code, or simply chapter 12, is a chapter of the Bankruptcy Code. It is similar to Chapter 13 in structure, but it offers additional benefits to farmers and fishermen in certain circumstances, beyond those available to ordinary wage earners. Chapter 12 is applicable only to family farmers and fishermen.

== History ==
=== Background ===
For much of the history of bankruptcy law in the United States, there was no provision applicable specifically to farmers. The 1898 Bankruptcy Act contained no special provisions, with one exception that farmers were immune from an involuntary bankruptcy petition. Section 75 was enacted by the Bankruptcy Act of 1933 and provided specific provisions for farmers. However, many of these provisions were limited in scope, and ultimately required the voluntary cooperation of mortgagors and creditors.

In addition, section 75, as it was originally conceived, was a temporary measure. It was scheduled to expire on March 3, 1938.

The Frazier-Lemke Act expanded the scope of section 75, providing for stronger protections available to farmers operating under bankruptcy protection. These changes too were initially temporary, but they were extended a number of times until they ultimately expired on March 31, 1949.

By and large, after the expiration of section 75, farmers were subject to the same rules of bankruptcy as other debtors. The application of the same rules was the case after the passage of the Bankruptcy Code of 1976 until 1986.

=== Passage ===
Chapter 12 was added to the Bankruptcy Code in 1986 by the Bankruptcy Judges, United States Trustees, and Family Farmer Bankruptcy Act of 1986. It went into effect on November 26, 1986.

The modification of the bankruptcy code was intended as an emergency response to tightening agricultural credit in the early and mid-1980s, in the middle of a number of notable bank failures.

The Act was to originally expire on October 1, 1993, but it was extended a number of times without expiring until it was made permanent by the 2005 BAPCPA.

== Description ==
=== Definitions ===
Under chapter 12, a "family farmer" is defined as an individual who owns and is engaged in a farming operation (which includes farming, tillage of the soil, dairy, ranching, crops, poultry and/or livestock, and production of poultry and/or livestock) with aggregate debts of less than $10,000,000. At least half of these debts must arise from the farming operation, and the farmer must receive more than 50% of gross income from farming in the preceding tax year.

A family farmer may also be defined as a corporation or partnership at least 50% owned by one family who conduct farming operations, with at least 80% of its value derived from farming assets and aggregate debts of less than $10,000,000 (at least 50% of which must derive from the farming operation). The corporation or partnership may also not have publicly traded stock in order to be defined as a family farmer.

=== Implementation ===
Chapter 12 provides additional benefits not available under chapter 13 and chapter 11. These benefits include higher debt ceilings than those under chapter 13, and more advantageous exemptions.

While each Chapter 12 reorganization will look different depending on the business, the process follows a general outline. First, farmers should find an attorney to help assess their eligibility and guide them through the planning process. Farmers will have 14 days after filing a chapter 12 petition to file all supplementary information such as income, debts, and the like. Once this has been filed, the court will send a notice to all parties involved, including creditors. Between 21 and 40 days after the petition is filed, a meeting between the debtor and the creditors will be held (sometimes called a 341 meeting) in order to review documents, ask questions, and verify the petition's accuracy. Within 90 days of filing, the debtor must file a chapter 12 plan with the court, which will be confirmed or denied within 45 days of filing. Once confirmed, the plan will be implemented and payments will begin (chapter 12 does not include a 30 day requirement such as under chapter 13). Payments are submitted to the plan trustee, who distributes to creditors. Once payments are complete, the debts are discharged by the court.
