= Elena Kagan Supreme Court nomination =

United States Supreme Court nomination

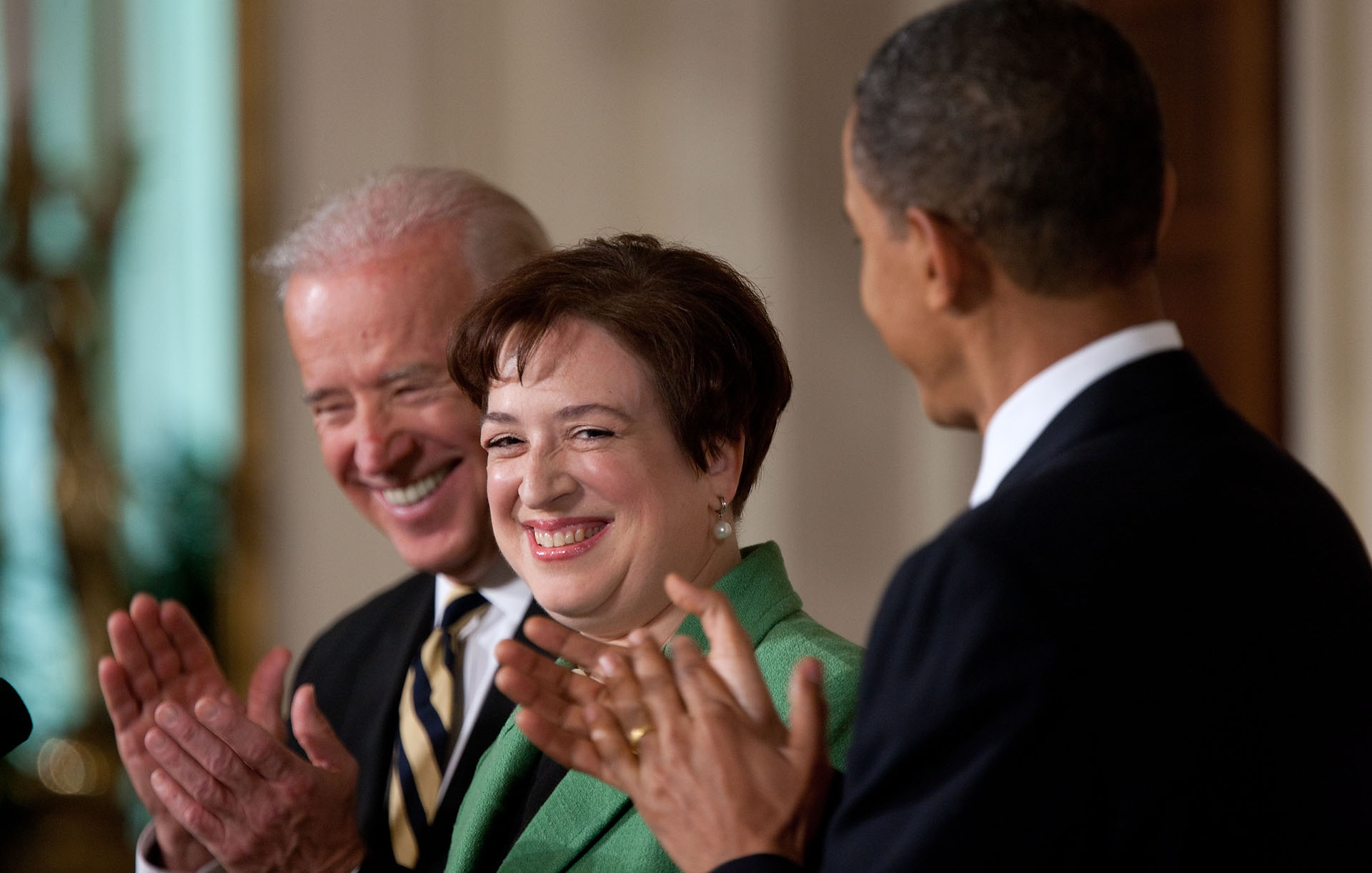
- Kagan with President Obama and then-Vice President Joe Biden at the announcement of the nomination in the East Room of the White House
- Nominee: Elena Kagan
- Nominated by: Barack Obama (president of the United States)
- Succeeding: John Paul Stevens (associate justice)
- Date nominated: May 10, 2010
- Date confirmed: August 5, 2010
- Outcome: Approved by the U.S. Senate

Vote of the Senate Judiciary Committee
- Votes in favor: 13
- Votes against: 6
- Result: Reported favorably

Senate confirmation vote
- Votes in favor: 63
- Votes against: 37
- Result: Confirmed

On May 10, 2010, President Barack Obama announced his selection of Elena Kagan for Associate Justice of the Supreme Court of the United States, to replace retiring Justice John Paul Stevens. Kagan's nomination was confirmed by a 63–37 vote of the United States Senate on August 5, 2010. When nominated, Kagan was Solicitor General of the United States, a position to which Obama had appointed her in March 2009. Kagan was the first Supreme Court nominee since Sandra Day O'Connor in 1981 to not be a sitting circuit court judge and the most recent such nominee as of 2026. She was the first Supreme Court nominee since William Rehnquist and Lewis F. Powell Jr. in 1971 (Note: Rehnquist and Powell were nominated by Richard Nixon in 1971 to fill two simultaneous vacancies arising from the retirements and imminent deaths of John Marshall Harlan II and Hugo Black. They took their positions on the bench on the same date – January 7, 1972) to not be a sitting judge on any court.

== Nomination ==
=== Potential candidates ===
On April 9, 2010, John Paul Stevens announced that he would retire from the Supreme Court on June 29, at the start of the Court's summer 2010 recess. He had served as an associate justice for 34 years. Those considered front-runners for the nomination by press reports, in addition to Elena Kagan, were Diane Wood and Merrick Garland. Kagan had also been a finalist for the Court vacancy one year earlier, when Justice Sonia Sotomayor was selected to succeed the retiring David Souter.

=== Announcement ===
President Barack Obama nominates Kagan to the U.S. Supreme Court (14 min 6 secs).

President Barack Obama announced the nomination of Elena Kagan to the Supreme Court on May 10, 2010. He praised Kagan as a "consensus builder", and said that she "is widely regarded as one of the nation's foremost legal minds". The nomination was formally received by the Senate that same day, and was subsequently referred to the Judiciary Committee.

== Response to the nomination ==
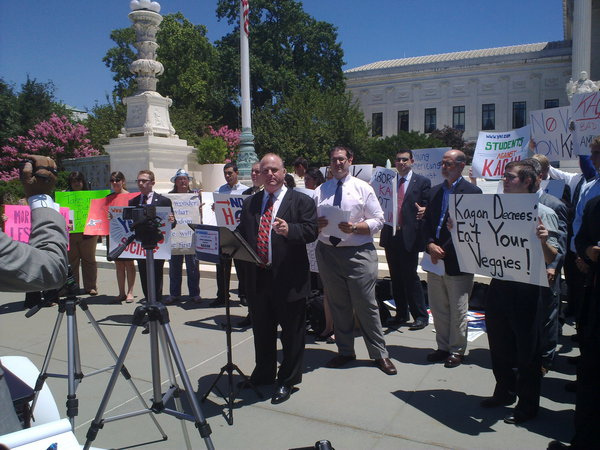
Activist Michael Johns and tea party members demonstrate against Kagan on July 1, 2010.

In the Senate, Kagan's nomination was received positively by most Democrats. Judiciary Committee chairman Patrick Leahy applauded Kagan's experience and qualifications. In doing so, he called attention to her work in academia and with the federal government – noting that both were outside the so-called "judicial monastery" from which most contemporary justices have come. The last justices to join the Court without any prior judicial experience had been Lewis Powell and William Rehnquist, both appointed by President Richard Nixon in 1972.

Republicans were quick to express criticism, particularly over her handling of military recruiters during her time as Dean of Harvard Law School, as well as her work as a law clerk for the late Justice Thurgood Marshall, whom many of them deemed a liberal activist. Even so, minority whip Jon Kyl, who supported Kagan's nominations for solicitor general (a "temporary political appointment") but was reticent to support her associate justice (a "lifetime appointment"), all but ruled out using a filibuster to block a final Senate floor vote on the nomination, telling CBS's Face the Nation, "The filibuster should be relegated to extreme circumstances, and I don't think Elena Kagan represents that." Opposition to Kagan among Senate Republicans was not universal however. A few expressed support for her, including Lindsey Graham, Susan Collins and Richard Lugar.

The deans of over one-third of the country's law schools, 69 people in total, endorsed Elena Kagan's nomination in an open letter in early June. The letter lauded what it considered her coalition-building skills and "understanding of both doctrine and policy" as well as her written record of legal analysis.

The National Rifle Association of America announced its opposition to Kagan, and stated that it would score the vote on her confirmation, meaning that Senators who vote in favor of Kagan would receive a lower rating from the organization. At the same time, the Brady Campaign to Prevent Gun Violence announced its support for Kagan's nomination.

In a 2010 column, Pat Buchanan expressed his disapproval at Barack Obama's nomination of Elena Kagan, to the United States Supreme Court. Pointing out that Democrats had failed to nominate a single black person to the Supreme Court for the last 43 years, Buchanan wrote: "If Kagan is confirmed, Jews, who represent less than 2 percent of the US population, will have 33 percent of the Supreme Court seats. Is this the Democrats' idea of diversity?".

== Judiciary Committee review ==
=== Confirmation hearings ===
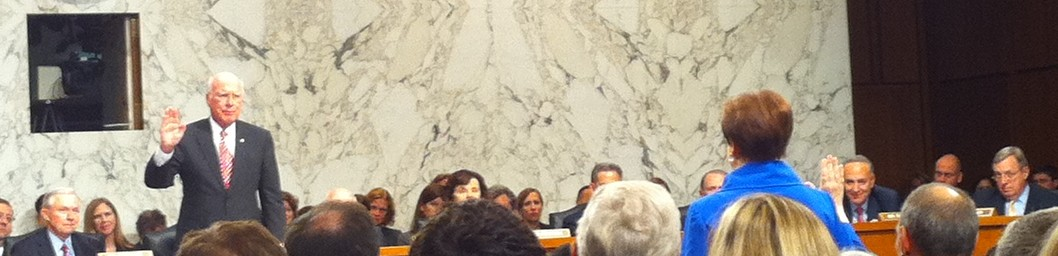
Senate Judiciary Committee Chairman Patrick Leahy swears in Kagan during her first day of testimony.

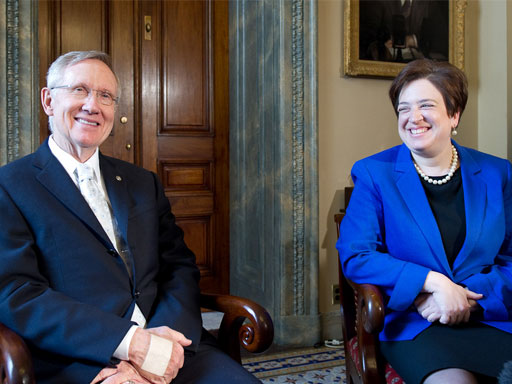
Senate Majority Leader Harry Reid meeting with Kagan

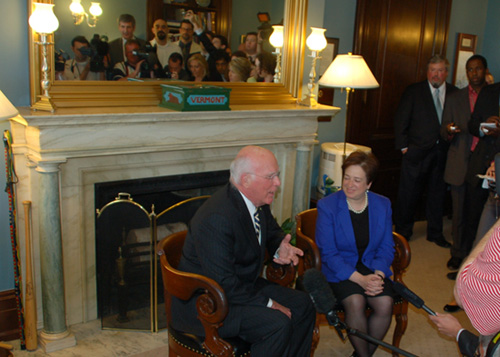
Judiciary Chairman Patrick Leahy meeting with Kagan

Kagan's Confirmation hearing before the Senate Judiciary Committee began on June 28, 2010. From the 28th through the 30th, Kagan underwent two rounds of questioning by each member of the committee. Several witnesses were called to give testimony before the Judiciary Committee at the hearings. These witnesses included Kim Askew and William J. Kayatta, Jr. of the American Bar Association. The Democratic members of the committee called witnesses that included:

- Professor Robert C. Clark, Harvard University Distinguished Service Professor, Austin Wakeman Scott Professor of Law, and former Dean, Harvard Law School
- Fernande "Nan" Duffly, Associate Justice, Massachusetts Court of Appeals, on behalf of the National Association of Women Judges
- Greg Garre, Partner, Latham & Watkins, former Solicitor General of the United States
- Jennifer Gibbins, Executive Director, Prince William Soundkeeper
- Jack Goldsmith, Professor of Law, Harvard University
- Marcia Greenberger, Founder and Co-President, National Women's Law Center
- Jack Gross, plaintiff, Gross v. FBL Financial Services, Inc.
- Lilly Ledbetter, plaintiff, Ledbetter v. Goodyear Tire & Rubber Co.
- Professor Ronald Sullivan, Edward R. Johnston Lecturer on Law, Director of the Criminal Justice Institute, Harvard Law School
- Kurt White, President, Harvard Law Armed Forces Association

Republican members of the committee called the following witnesses:

- Robert Alt, Senior Fellow and Deputy Director, Center for Legal and Judicial Studies, The Heritage Foundation
- Lt. Gen. William "Jerry" Boykin, United States Army (ret.)
- Capt. Pete Hegseth, Army National Guar* Commissioner Peter Kirsanow, Benesch Law Firm
- David Kopel, Esq., Research Director, Independence Institute
- Colonel Thomas N. Moe, United States Air Force (ret.)
- David Norcross, Esq., Blank Rome
- William J. Olson, Esq., William J. Olson, P.C.
- Tony Perkins, President, Family Research Council
- Stephen Presser, Raoul Berger Professor of Legal History, Northwestern University School of Law
- Ronald Rotunda, The Doy & Dee Henley Chair and Distinguished Professor of Jurisprudence, Chapman University School of Law
- Ed Whelan, President, Ethics and Public Policy Center
- Dr. Charmaine Yoest, President & CEO, Americans United for Life
- Capt. Flagg Youngblood, United States Army

=== Committee vote ===
After the completion of testimony, Republicans on the Judiciary Committee successfully delayed a vote on forwarding the nomination to the full Senate for one week. On July 20, the committee voted 13–6 to endorse and forward the nomination, with only one Republican, Lindsey Graham, voting in the affirmative. To date she is the last nominee to the Supreme Court to have a Bipartisan committee vote.

== Full Senate vote ==
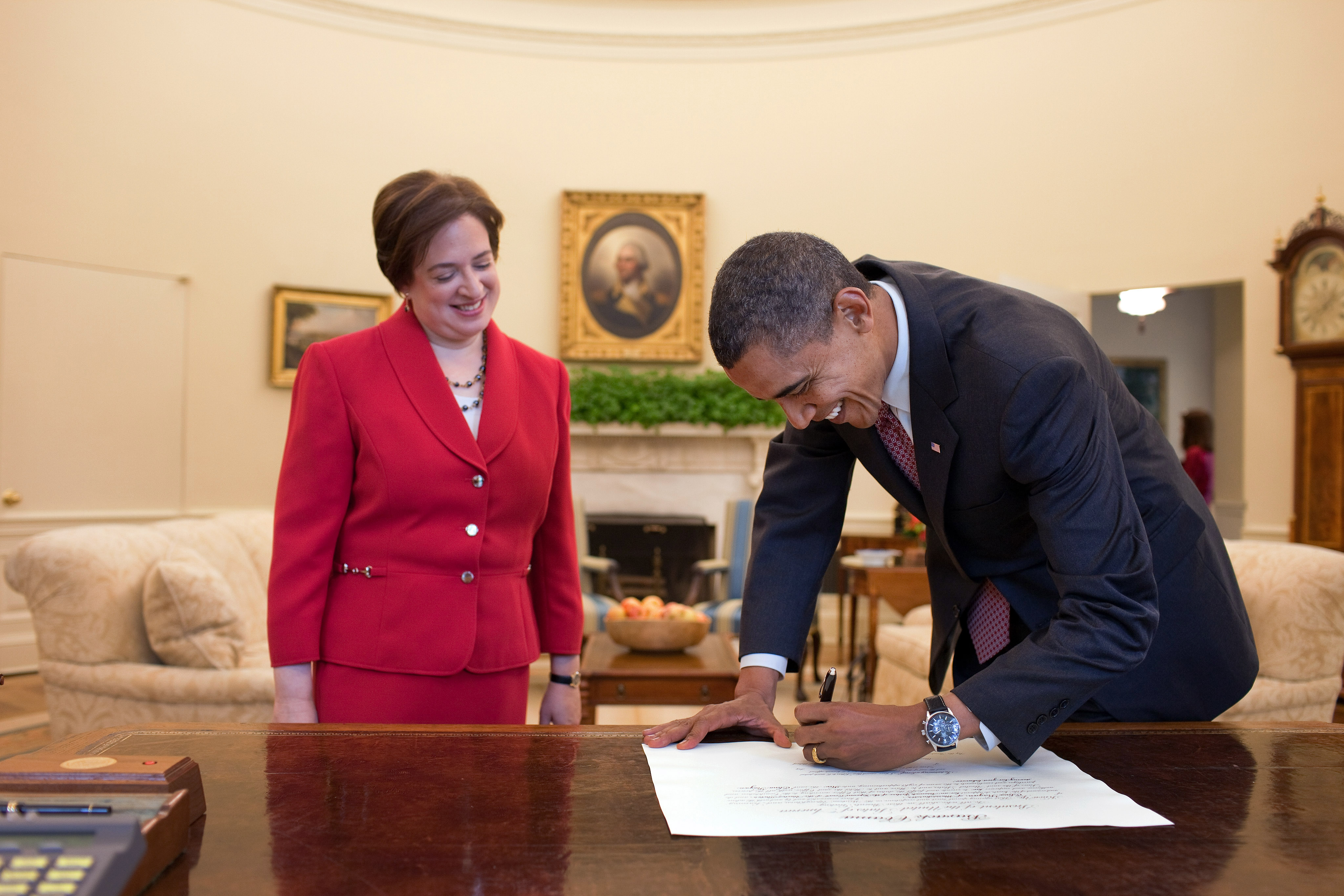
Obama signing Kagan's commission on August 6, 2010, following her Senate confirmation

The Senate confirmed Elena Kagan to be an associate justice of the Supreme Court on August 5, 2010, by a vote of 63–37. All Democrats, except for Ben Nelson, voted for her, as did Independents Joe Lieberman and Bernie Sanders, and five Republicans: Susan Collins, Lindsey Graham, Judd Gregg, Richard Lugar, and Olympia Snowe.

Senate vote on PN1768 Elena Kagan, of Massachusetts, to be an Associate Justice of the Supreme Court of the United States.
August 5, 2010	Party			Total votes
August 5, 2010	Democratic	Republican	Independent	Total votes
Yea	56	5	2	63
Nay	1	36	0	37
Result: Confirmed
Roll call vote: Senator / Party / State / Vote; Daniel Akaka / D / Hawaii / Yea; Lamar Alexander / R / Tennessee / Nay; John Barrasso / R / Wyoming / Nay; Max Baucus / D / Montana / Yea; Evan Bayh / D / Indiana / Yea; Mark Begich / D / Alaska / Yea; Michael Bennet / D / Colorado / Yea; Bob Bennett / R / Utah / Nay; Jeff Bingaman / D / New Mexico / Yea; Kit Bond / R / Missouri / Nay; Barbara Boxer / D / California / Yea; Scott Brown / R / Massachusetts / Nay; Sherrod Brown / D / Ohio / Yea; Sam Brownback / R / Kansas / Nay; Jim Bunning / R / Kentucky / Nay; Richard Burr / R / North Carolina / Nay; Roland Burris / D / Illinois / Yea; Maria Cantwell / D / Washington / Yea; Ben Cardin / D / Maryland / Yea; Tom Carper / D / Delaware / Yea; Bob Casey Jr. / D / Pennsylvania / Yea; Saxby Chambliss / R / Georgia / Nay; Tom Coburn / R / Oklahoma / Nay; Thad Cochran / R / Mississippi / Nay; Susan Collins / R / Maine / Yea; Kent Conrad / D / North Dakota / Yea; Bob Corker / R / Tennessee / Nay; John Cornyn / R / Texas / Nay; Mike Crapo / R / Idaho / Nay; Jim DeMint / R / South Carolina / Nay; Chris Dodd / D / Connecticut / Yea; Byron Dorgan / D / North Dakota / Yea; Dick Durbin / D / Illinois / Yea; John Ensign / R / Nevada / Nay; Mike Enzi / R / Wyoming / Nay; Russ Feingold / D / Wisconsin / Yea; Dianne Feinstein / D / California / Yea; Al Franken / D / Minnesota / Yea; Kirsten Gillibrand / D / New York / Yea; Carte Goodwin / D / West Virginia / Yea; Lindsey Graham / R / South Carolina / Yea; Chuck Grassley / R / Iowa / Nay; Judd Gregg / R / New Hampshire / Yea; Kay Hagan / D / North Carolina / Yea; Tom Harkin / D / Iowa / Yea; Orrin Hatch / R / Utah / Nay; Kay Bailey Hutchison / R / Texas / Nay; Jim Inhofe / R / Oklahoma / Nay; Daniel Inouye / D / Hawaii / Yea; Johnny Isakson / R / Georgia / Nay; Mike Johanns / R / Nebraska / Nay; Tim Johnson / D / South Dakota / Yea; Ted Kaufman / D / Delaware / Yea; John Kerry / D / Massachusetts / Yea; Amy Klobuchar / D / Minnesota / Yea; Herb Kohl / D / Wisconsin / Yea; Jon Kyl / R / Arizona / Nay; Mary Landrieu / D / Louisiana / Yea; Frank Lautenberg / D / New Jersey / Yea; Patrick Leahy / D / Vermont / Yea; George LeMieux / R / Florida / Nay; Carl Levin / D / Michigan / Yea; Joe Lieberman / I / Connecticut / Yea; Blanche Lincoln / D / Arkansas / Yea; Richard Lugar / R / Indiana / Yea; John McCain / R / Arizona / Nay; Claire McCaskill / D / Missouri / Yea; Mitch McConnell / R / Kentucky / Nay; Bob Menendez / D / New Jersey / Yea; Jeff Merkley / D / Oregon / Yea; Barbara Mikulski / D / Maryland / Yea; Lisa Murkowski / R / Alaska / Nay; Patty Murray / D / Washington / Yea; Bill Nelson / D / Florida / Yea; Ben Nelson / D / Nebraska / Nay; Mark Pryor / D / Arkansas / Yea; Jack Reed / D / Rhode Island / Yea; Harry Reid / D / Nevada / Yea; Jim Risch / R / Idaho / Nay; Pat Roberts / R / Kansas / Nay; Jay Rockefeller / D / West Virginia / Yea; Bernie Sanders / I / Vermont / Yea; Chuck Schumer / D / New York / Yea; Jeff Sessions / R / Alabama / Nay; Jeanne Shaheen / D / New Hampshire / Yea; Richard Shelby / R / Alabama / Nay; Olympia Snowe / R / Maine / Yea; Arlen Specter / D / Pennsylvania / Yea; Debbie Stabenow / D / Michigan / Yea; Jon Tester / D / Montana / Yea; John Thune / R / South Dakota / Nay; Mark Udall / D / Colorado / Yea; Tom Udall / D / New Mexico / Yea; David Vitter / R / Louisiana / Nay; George Voinovich / R / Ohio / Nay; Mark Warner / D / Virginia / Yea; Jim Webb / D / Virginia / Yea; Sheldon Whitehouse / D / Rhode Island / Yea; Roger Wicker / R / Mississippi / Nay; Ron Wyden / D / Oregon / Yea

Kagan's swearing-in ceremony as Associate Justice took place on August 7, 2010, at the White House. Chief Justice John Roberts administered the prescribed constitutional and judicial oaths of office, at which time she became the 112th justice (100th associate justice) of the Supreme Court.

== See also ==
- Barack Obama Supreme Court candidates
- Demographics of the Supreme Court of the United States
