= Chapter 13, Title 11, United States Code =

Section of the United States Bankruptcy Code

Title 11 of the United States Code sets forth the statutes governing the various types of relief for bankruptcy in the United States. Chapter 13 of the United States Bankruptcy Code provides an individual with the opportunity to propose a plan of reorganization to reorganize their financial affairs while under the bankruptcy court's protection. The purpose of chapter 13 is to enable an individual with a regular source of income to propose a chapter 13 plan that provides for their various classes of creditors. Under chapter 13, the Bankruptcy Court has the power to approve a chapter 13 plan without the approval of creditors as long as it meets the statutory requirements under chapter 13. Chapter 13 plans are usually three to five years in length and may not exceed five years. Chapter 13 is in contrast to the purpose of Chapter 7, which does not provide for a plan of reorganization, but provides for the discharge of certain debt and the liquidation of non-exempt property. A Chapter 13 plan may be looked at as a form of debt consolidation, but a Chapter 13 allows a person to achieve much more than simply consolidating his or her unsecured debt such as credit cards and personal loans. A chapter 13 plan may provide for the four general categories of debt: priority claims, secured claims, priority unsecured claims, and general unsecured claims. Chapter 13 plans are often used to cure arrearages on a mortgage, avoid "underwater" junior mortgages or other liens, pay back taxes over time, or partially repay general unsecured debt. In recent years, some bankruptcy courts have allowed Chapter 13 to be used as a platform to expedite a mortgage modification application.

== Choice of chapter ==
An individual who is badly in debt can typically file for bankruptcy either under Chapter 7 (liquidation, or straight bankruptcy) or Chapter 13 (reorganization). In some cases, options may also include Chapter 12 (family farmer reorganization) and Chapter 11 (reorganization of a company, or an individual debtor whose debts exceed the limits for a Chapter 13 filing). As a Chapter 11 bankruptcy is considerably more complex and expensive than a Chapter 13 case, few debtors will choose Chapter 11 if a Chapter 13 bankruptcy is an option.

Debtors may also be forced into bankruptcy by creditors in the case of an involuntary bankruptcy, but only under Chapters 7 or 11. However, in most instances, the debtor may choose under which chapter to file. In the case of an involuntary bankruptcy, the debtor may also choose to convert from the forced Chapter 7 or 11 proceeding into a proceeding under another chapter.

The debtor's financial characteristics and the type of relief sought play a tremendous role in the choice of chapters. In some cases, the debtor simply cannot file under Chapter 13, as he or she lacks the disposable income necessary to fund a viable Chapter 13 plan (see below). Furthermore, Section 109(e) of Title 11, United States Code sets forth debt limits for individuals to be eligible to file under Chapter 13: unsecured debts of less than $419,275, and secured debts of less than $1,257,850.

Under Chapter 13, the debtor proposes a plan to pay his or her creditors over a 3-to-5 year period. This written plan details all of the transactions (and their durations) that will occur, and repayment according to the plan must begin within 30 to 45 days after the case has started. During this period, his or her creditors cannot attempt to collect on the individual's previously incurred debt except through the bankruptcy court. In general, the individual gets to keep their property, and his or her creditors end up with less money than they would have had the amount given to the debtor continued to collect interest, allowing the debtor to find a way to pay the amount owed without losing their assets.

=== Disadvantages ===
The disadvantage of filing for personal bankruptcy is that, under the Fair Credit Reporting Act, a record of this stays on the individual's credit report for up to 7 years (up to 10 years for Chapter 7); still, it is possible to obtain new debt or credit (cards, auto, or consumer loans) after only 12–24 months, and a new FHA mortgage loan just 25 months after discharge, and Fannie Mae and Freddie Mac loans after 36 months. However, during the pendency of a Chapter 13 case, the debtor is not permitted to obtain additional credit without the permission of the bankruptcy court. Moreover, creditors may not even be willing to risk lending money to such an individual, regardless of their legal ability to make a request. However, this disadvantage is not unique to Chapter 13; it may also apply to individuals currently in a Chapter 11 or Chapter 12 case or those who are in (or have recently been in) a Chapter 7 case.

=== Advantages ===
The advantages of Chapter 13 over Chapter 7 include the ability to stop foreclosures although a foreclosure would be reinstated upon completion of the bankruptcy; achieve a "super discharge" of debts not dischargeable under Chapter 7; "value collateral"; bifurcate the security interest of creditors in certain property that creditors are either charging too much interest for, or are over-secured, or both, and leading to a "cram down" modification of the debt; and prevent collection activities against non-filing co-signers ("co-debtors") during the life of the case.

== Chapter 13 plan ==
A chapter 13 plan is a document filed with or shortly after a debtor's Chapter 13 bankruptcy petition.

The plan details the treatment of debts, liens, and the secured status of assets and liabilities owned or owed by the debtor in regard to his bankruptcy petition. In order for a plan to take effect, it must meet a number of requirements. These are specified in § 1325 and include:

- providing that unsecured creditors will receive at least as much through the chapter 13 plan as they would in a chapter 7 liquidation
- either not be objected to, repay all creditors in full, or commit all of the debtor's disposable income to the Chapter 13 plan for at least three years (or five years for a debtor who makes an above median income)
