= User model =

User model may refer to:

- User modeling
- User interface modeling

== See also ==
- Adaptive hypermedia
- Web personalisation
- User modeling
- User profile
