= Mancusi v. DeForte =

1968 U.S. Supreme Court case

- Supreme Court of the United States

Argued April 25, 1968 Decided June 17, 1968
- Full case name: United States ex rel. Frank DeForte, appellant v. Vincent R. Mancusi, Warden of Attica Prison, Attica, New York, appellee
- Docket no.: 68-844
- Citations: 392 U.S. 364 (more) 88 S. Ct. 2120; 20 L. Ed. 2d 1154
- Argument: Oral argument
- Opinion announcement: Opinion announcement

Case history
- Prior: Conviction affirmed sub nom. People v. DeGrandis, 16 A.D.2d 834, 228 N.Y.S.2d 875 (N.Y. App. Div. 1962); affirmed, 12 N.Y.2d 812, 236 N.Y.S.2d 63, 187 N.E.2d 130 (1962); cert. denied, 375 U.S. 868 (1963); 1st writ habeas corpus denied, unreported; affirmed sub. nom. DeGrandis v. Fay, 335 F.2d 173 (2d Cir. 1964); 2nd writ denied, 261 F. Supp. 579 (W.D.N.Y., 1966); reversed, 379 F.2d 897 (2d Cir. 1967); cert. granted, 390 U.S. 903 (1968).

Holding
- Documents obtained by prosecutor personally executing subpoena duces tecum from desk of union official were unconstitutionally admitted as evidence in later trial that convicted official of rackeetering-related charges; reasonable expectation of privacy under Fourth Amendment can exist in workplace without possessory interest in same. Second Circuit affirmed.

Court membership
- Chief Justice Earl Warren Associate Justices Hugo Black · William O. Douglas; John M. Harlan II · William J. Brennan Jr. Potter Stewart · Byron White; Abe Fortas · Thurgood Marshall

Case opinions
- Majority: Harlan, joined by Warren, Douglas, Brennan, Fortas, Marshall
- Dissent: Black, joined by Stewart
- Dissent: White

Laws applied
- U.S. Const. Amd. IV

Mancusi v. DeForte, 392 U.S. 364 (1968), is a decision of the United States Supreme Court on privacy and the Fourth Amendment. It originated in the lower courts as United States ex rel. Frank DeForte, appellant v. Vincent R. Mancusi, Warden of Attica Prison, Attica, New York, appellee, a petition for a writ of habeas corpus by a prisoner who had exhausted all his state appeals. By a 6–3 margin the Court affirmed the United States Court of Appeals for the Second Circuit's reversal of a district court denial of the petition.

The prisoner, Frank DeForte, was one of several labor union officials on Long Island who had been convicted of racketeering-related charges connected to a scheme in which they attempted to monopolize the jukebox market in the New York Metropolitan area. Early in the investigation, local prosecutors had issued a subpoena duces tecum for records from the union officials. When they refused to comply, the prosecutors went to the union offices themselves and seized the records from the officials' desks themselves. DeForte had been present and voiced his objections. The state later admitted the action was illegal but the documents, which formed the bulk of the case against the officials, were not suppressed at trial. Both the state's appellate court and the New York State Court of Appeals sustained the verdict, and all the defendants went to prison. There they began filing habeas petitions to the federal courts. The first, alleging that the court's orders to the jury to continue deliberating after they had done so for almost 24 hours and twice asked for a break constituted coercion, was denied.

DeForte's second, arguing as he had at trial and on his state appeal, that the search of his desk violated his reasonable expectation of privacy and thus his Fourth Amendment rights, was the one the Supreme Court heard. Justice John Marshall Harlan II wrote for the majority that under the Court's recent holding in Katz v. United States, DeForte had a reasonable expectation of privacy over the papers he kept at work even though they were not his personal property and he shared the office with his co-defendants. Nor did the subpoena authorize the prosecutor to act as he might with a search warrant, since the subpoena was not subject to independent judicial review before its execution. In dissent, Hugo Black, who had also dissented in Katz, said he could not find why the Court chose to depart from previous holdings that documents in the possession of one's employer enjoyed no Fourth Amendment protection, and was misreading the cases it relied on.

The case is seen as a seminal case in privacy law, since it extended it for the first time to a non-residential space. Lower courts have used it to guide them in distinguishing Fourth Amendment claims into the present day. The Supreme Court has, in later holdings, extended it to include public employees during administrative investigations and considered its application in the context of modern telecommunications.

== Background of the case ==
For most of American history the Fourth Amendment's requirement that the people "be secure in their persons, houses, papers, and effects, against unreasonable searches and seizures" was taken to apply strictly only to their physical bodies and real property they had an ownership interest in. Advances in communications technology at the start of the Information Age would challenge that. In the 1928 case Olmstead v. United States the Court upheld a bootlegging conviction that relied solely on transcripts of telephone conversations that had been obtained through warrantless wiretapping of the defendants' telephone lines, an action illegal under Washington state law. The majority held that since the Prohibition agents had not actually trespassed on the bootleggers' property to place the wiretaps, the Fourth Amendment had not been violated, and that the language of the amendment in any event referred only to material things. One of the dissenting justices, Louis Brandeis, wrote a frequently quoted opinion arguing that the Fourth Amendment protected not just those rights associated with property but "the right to be let alone", speculating that future technological advances might be yet more intrusive.

In the ensuing decades the Olmstead majority's holding began to seem more and more inadequate. Telephone use became more widespread, and the public grew concerned over the idea that anyone, not just the government, could listen into private and intimate conversations which once took place only in person. Improvements in audio recording technology meant that such intrusions were possible without a human actually present. This led Congress to pass anti-wiretapping statutes which still allowed law enforcement to listen in with the telephone company's permission, since those companies were the lawful owners of the wires and switches where the wiretapping could take place.

The Warren Court was the first to recognize that the traditional application of the Fourth Amendment to property one owned had its shortcomings. In Jones v. United States, a drug prosecution where the defendant had challenged the use of evidence taken during a search of an apartment he had access to, the Court had extended the Fourth Amendment's protections to anyone "legitimately on the premises". (Note: That aspect of Jones would be overruled as too broad in Rakas v. Illinois, 439 U.S. 128 (1978), which replaced it with a rule that defendants must show that they had a reasonable expectation of privacy in the place searched.) A line of cases in the area of reproductive freedom had also entertained and eventually adopted the idea that personal privacy in that area was protected independently of the premises of a dwelling. In Mapp v. Ohio, the Court extended the exclusionary rule under which evidence obtained unconstitutionally cannot be used at trial, to state as well as federal prosecutions, greatly increasing the cases of alleged Fourth Amendment violations it was asked to review.

== Underlying prosecution ==
In the late 1950s, allegations of racketeering activities by some labor unions led the U.S. Senate to create a Select Committee on Improper Activities in Labor and Management to investigate. It soon became known as the Labor Rackets Committee or the McClellan Committee, after its chair, John McClellan of Arkansas. Chief committee counsel Robert F. Kennedy was frequently criticized for apparent disregard of witnesses' constitutional rights. The committee and its large staff devoted much of their attention to the International Brotherhood of Teamsters (IBT), where Jimmy Hoffa had been allegedly working with organized crime figures to unseat Dave Beck as union head. It feared that if Hoffa led the Teamsters, the union would have enough power to disrupt the U.S. economy.

The committee had focused on some of the paper locals Hoffa had purportedly created to stack votes in his favor during the leadership election. The officers of one, Local 266 in Manhattan, were nominally attempting to organize juke box and coin-operated game servicemen in the New York metropolitan area. District attorneys around New York began their own investigations into allegations that Local 266 was trying to intimidate employers into allowing the Teamsters to represent their employees instead of other unions they already had collective bargaining agreements with. McClellan called Local 266 "phony and gangster-ridden".

=== Criminal investigation and trial ===
In May 1959 prosecutors from the Nassau County district attorney's office, who had been investigating Local 266 for three months, subpoenaed its records. The local refused to produce them. The prosecutors then went to the headquarters themselves with the subpoena and took, according to a contemporary account, "records, membership lists, bank books and even pictures on the wall." The local's vice president, Frank DeForte, was present at the time and objected strongly to the seizure of the documents.

The Nassau County prosecutors took the documents back to Mineola and presented it to a grand jury. It indicted 15 defendants, including DeForte and the other Local 266 officials, on 16 separate counts of conspiracy, criminal coercion and extortion. The trial began the following February.

Over the next three and a half months the jury heard 125 witnesses and reviewed 100 written documents submitted as exhibits. In May, after closing arguments, it received its instructions and withdrew to deliberate over the fate of the 10 remaining defendants. After breaks for lunch and dinner, the jury continued deliberating until late in the evening. The foreman sent a note to the judge saying jurors were fatigued and asking for advice. The judge asked if they wanted coffee and sandwiches. The foreman responded that the jurors felt that they were unable to reach a decision on all the charges and could benefit from some rest.

=== All-night jury deliberations ===
The jurors were told to continue. They took their sandwiches and coffee four hours later, at 2:30 a.m. Almost two hours further into the night, the foreman sent another note to the judge saying the jurors were at an impasse and needed to get some sleep. The judge called them into the courtroom to tell them that it would not be until 6 a.m. at the earliest that any hotel rooms could be arranged and that any rest they got would thus be brief as they would have to return to the courtroom by 1 p.m. He asked if they would rather continue to deliberate, resolve their impasse and go home.

The foreman said the jury would prefer to get some sleep. The judge responded by telling them to go back to their rooms while overnight accommodations were sought. At 5 a.m. he summoned them back into the courtroom to tell them that most of the nearby hotels and motels were fully booked. The only possibility that might work was four rooms at a motel where cots could be set up. The foreman asked to retire and consider this. Again the judge reminded them it might be better to continue on.

After the jury withdrew, they again began to deliberate, requesting more exhibits, testimony and additional instructions. Following a breakfast break after 6 a.m., they returned to the courtroom and were instructed as they had requested. The jury again withdrew for three hours. As noon approached the judge sent a note asking if they were close to a verdict. The reply said they were. Following another helping of sandwiches and coffee, they returned with their verdict just before 2 p.m., 28 hours after deliberations began.

They returned a mixture of verdicts. For one defendant they could not agree; another was acquitted of all charges. The remaining defendants were convicted of at least some of the charges. At sentencing most received fines and suspended sentences. The judge was harsher with DeForte and the other Local 266 officials, president Joseph De Grandis and secretary Ernest Zundel. All three were sentenced to prison. De Grandis, with a prior felony conviction, got seven and a half to eight years. DeForte and Zundel, both of whom were first-time felons, got terms of three to five years.

=== Appeals to state courts ===
Lawyers for the three indicated they would appeal the conviction. They challenged the original seizure of the papers by the district attorney's office as unconstitutional, and argued the long deliberations without sleep had improperly coerced the jury and tainted the result. Two years later, in 1962, the Second Department of the New York Supreme Court, Appellate Division, upheld the conviction. A five-judge panel handed down a short decision addressing the Fourth Amendment claim.

"Such records were not the defendants' private, personal papers; they were the property of the union", the appellate division wrote. "Whatever possession the defendants had of these records was merely in their capacity as representatives of the union, and not in their private or individual capacity." It dismissed the other arguments as "untenable".

The defendants next took the case to the New York Court of Appeals, the highest court in the state. In a 4–3 decision, it affirmed the Appellate Division without comment late in 1962. The dissenters, including Chief Judge Charles S. Desmond, found the dispositive issue was not the seizure of the documents but the long deliberations. "[K]eeping the jury in deliberation for over 24 consecutive hours without any respite, and after they had advised the court of their fatigue on more than one occasion," they wrote, "constitutes coercion of the jury as matter of law." The next year the Supreme Court denied certiorari, ending the original case.

=== Habeas petitions ===
The three began serving their prison sentences in the Hudson Valley. De Grandis went to Green Haven Correctional Facility in Dutchess County, while DeForte and Zundel were sent to Sing Sing in Westchester County. Both prisons were within the jurisdiction of the federal Southern District of New York, and the three filed petitions for writs of habeas corpus with that court, alleging they had been unlawfully detained due to the alleged constitutional violations involved in both the evidence collection and trial.

==== Jury coercion claim ====
Their first petition, arguing as the dissenters at the state Court of Appeals had that the marathon jury deliberation was coercive, was rejected. They appealed to the Second Circuit Court of Appeals. In July 1964 a three-judge panel upheld the lower court. Leonard Moore recounted the history of the deliberations in detail. He criticized the trial judge for failing to anticipate that the jury might need to spend the night in a hotel, but found that the lack of sleep had not unduly affected its verdict.

"[T]he mere fact that a jury has been without sleep will not vitiate its verdict if its agreement was deliberate and voluntary and not due to fatigue and exhaustion," Moore wrote. He found it significant that the jury had, when finally offered the real possibility of sleep in the early morning, instead chosen to continue deliberations and made some progress. "It might well be that, figuratively speaking, the jury had gotten its second wind." He found further proof of the jury's clarity of mind in the range of verdicts it delivered, suggesting it had seriously considered the case and not just reached a verdict out of sleep-deprived desperation.

==== Fourth Amendment claim ====
DeForte was transferred further upstate, to Attica. In 1966 he filed another habeas petition against the warden, Vincent Mancusi, with the Western District of New York. This time he focused on the use of unlawfully obtained evidence at trial. He initially challenged both the seizure of the documents and the use of illegal wiretaps, but later withdrew the latter claim.

Two related arguments were raised against the document seizure. The first was procedural. Since Mapp had been decided prior to his conviction, DeForte argued, it should be applied to the trial and the evidence suppressed. More specifically to the case, he cited Jones. In an early interpretation of that case, Henzel v. United States, the Fifth Circuit had held that a defendant convicted of mail fraud had standing to challenge the use of corporate records against him.

Judge John Oliver Henderson denied the petition late in the year. He found Henzel to be a flawed precedent, writing that it "ignore[s] the personal nature of Fourth Amendment rights". Jones could not easily be applied to situations where corporate or organizational records were involved, even where, as in Henzel, the defendant had been the sole stockholder of the corporation from which the records were seized. "Envision, for example, a case in which the corporation's janitor was present during an illegal search and seizure but the corporation's vice-president was not."

He found a more recent interpretation of Jones, the Third Circuit case United States v. Grosso, to be controlling. There the court had upheld the use of records seized from a third party against a defendant convicted of involvement in a gambling ring. It held that the Supreme Court had only intended Jones to be applicable to a limited class of cases, and that those involving the seizure of corporate records did not fall into that category.

Since that was in accord with similar precedent in the Second Circuit, he found DeForte had no standing to challenge the use of the union records and denied the petition. Aware that there was recent authority to the contrary, he certified probable cause for an appeal. In June 1967 the Second Circuit heard the case again.

==== Success on appeal ====
A few weeks later DeForte prevailed. Judge Irving Kaufman wrote for another panel that reversed Henderson and ordered the writ issued. "The quest for a clear solution to the perplexing query as to who may challenge an allegedly unlawful search and seizure has been confounded by thorny problems" he began. After Mapp, state courts had to consider that question too, with only a few potentially conflicting Supreme Court decisions to guide them. Kaufman called Jones the first serious attempt to develop standards for making these decisions.

Jones had presented a defendant with a quandary: if he had, as case law up to that point required, claimed a possessory interest in the seized narcotics in order to suppress them, he would also have been incriminating himself, in violation of his rights under the Fifth Amendment. The Court resolved the issue by holding that in cases where mere possession of the property in question was the offense alleged, defendants need not have to admit to such ownership to challenge the admissibility of such evidence, and that they only had to demonstrate they were legitimately on the premises where the search occurred. (Note: As noted above, the "legitimately on premises" rule was overruled in Rakas, in favor of a doctrine that defendants must show they a reasonable expectation of privacy in the area searched. The other half of Jones, the "automatic standing" rule for defendants charged with possession offenses, was formally overruled in United States v. Salvucci 448 U.S. 83 (1980), where the majority held that the principle established by Simmons v. United States, 390 U.S. 377 (1968), that testimony by defendants at an evidentiary hearing challenging the admissibility of evidence under the Fourth Amendment could not be used against them at trial, made the Jones rule unnecessary.)

But while Jones had said what was not necessary to challenge a search, it did not say what was. That question would have to be established on a case-by-case basis. Turning to the specifics of the case, Kaufman took note of established precedent that the search of an office could be held unconstitutional. The state had argued that despite DeForte's presence in the office he lacked standing since the search was directed at Local 266, not him personally, and he did not have a separate office. But Kaufman noted that as an officer of the local, DeForte would necessarily have been targeted personally by the investigation, and in fact the local itself had not been indicted.

"[DeForte's] office also served as his place of business and in which he spent a considerable part of each day," Kaufman observed. "It appears to us to have been a clear invasion of privacy for the state's officials to have descended upon what was the union's office de jure, but DeForte's office de facto, and without a warrant and over his vigorous protests to have seized books and records, a substantial portion of which he had prepared and which were in his custody." Therefore, he had standing to challenge that search, and thus the conviction had to be set aside.

The state had cited other cases decided by the circuit in support of its position, but Kaufman found most of them irrelevant since they preceded Jones. Three had been decided afterwards, but they were easily distinguished. (Note: The three were United States v. Fago, 319 F.2d 791 (2d Cir. 1963); United States v. Bozza, 365 F.2d 206 (2d Cir. 1966) and United States v. Granello, 365 F.2d 990 (2d Cir. 1966). In Bozza the evidence at issue was a stolen gun seized from the home of another member of the burglary ring which none of the appellants had been charged with possessing, nor had they asserted a possessory interest or been present at the execution of the search. In Fago, the corporate records had been lawfully obtained by a county prosecutor looking into alleged corruption and then turned over to the Internal Revenue Service when they were found to contain evidence of tax evasion. And in Granello the defendants never asserted that they had owned or prepared the documents used as evidence of tax evasion.) The judge agreed with the position DeForte had argued before Henderson, that Henzel was the most relevant case of the available precedents.

== Before the Court ==
The prosecutors appealed to the Supreme Court, which this time granted certiorari. It put the case on the docket for its 1967 term. At the end of that year, before it heard oral arguments in what was now Mancusi v. DeForte, the Court handed down Katz v. United States, which changed some of the law under which DeForte's case had progressed.

Katz arose from circumstances similar to Olmstead, four decades earlier. The defendant, a Southern California bookmaker, had been convicted of gambling charges based largely on recordings of his end of conversations made by a bug on the outside of the telephone booth he had conducted his business from. At trial he had unsuccessfully tried to suppress that evidence; the Ninth Circuit held that it was lawfully obtained since, as in Olmstead, there had been no physical entry into the phone booth.

Justice Potter Stewart wrote for a seven-justice majority that overturned Olmstead and recognized the underlying principle of Brandeis's dissent in that case. "The Fourth Amendment protects people, not places ... the reach of that Amendment cannot turn upon the presence or absence of a physical intrusion into any given enclosure." John Marshall Harlan II's concurring opinion used the phrase "a reasonable expectation of privacy" that came to be the new understanding of what the Fourth Amendment protected.

== Decision ==
The Court announced its decision in June 1968, near the end of the term. By a 6–3 vote, they affirmed the appeals court. Justice John Marshall Harlan II wrote for the majority that the union records had been improperly seized. Hugo Black, the only dissenter in Katz, wrote for himself and Potter Stewart that the majority had retreated from previous holdings for no clear constitutional reason. Byron White wrote a single-sentence dissent.

=== Majority ===
Harlan reiterated that the Court's opinion was based purely on the Fourth Amendment claim DeForte had made, the only one before them. There was no need to decide a Fifth Amendment question, nor whether Fourth Amendment rights were primarily personal, or whether he could have asserted them on the union's behalf as well as his own. The Court considered only whether DeForte had standing to challenge the search, and if so, whether it had been illegal.

To establish that DeForte had standing, Harlan turned to previous cases. While the Fourth Amendment referred only to the right to be secure in houses, earlier Court decisions had extended that to include businesses as well. Other decisions, even before Jones, had held that that protection applied to even those individuals who did not hold legal title to a property. Finally, there was Katz, which "also makes it clear that capacity to claim the protection of the Amendment depends not upon a property right in the invaded place, but upon whether the area was one in which there was a reasonable expectation of freedom from governmental intrusion", Harlan wrote, echoing his concurrence in that case. "The crucial issue, therefore, is whether, in light of all the circumstances, DeForte's office was such a place."

While the office had been a large room DeForte shared with his fellow officers, with none of it reserved for his personal use, the record did not show where the individual documents had been taken from. DeForte had been present in the office when the subpoena was served, and it was a stipulated fact of the case that he spent much of his time working from that office. Therefore, Harlan concluded, he had custody of the papers at the time they were seized, and could object to the search and seizure. The Court had held in many cases that the search of an office could be challenged as well as a house, and Jones had eliminated the possessory-interest requirement.

If DeForte had had a private office, where he was unlikely to be disturbed at his desk except by those he had allowed in, Harlan continued, he would indisputably have had the standing to challenge the search. "It seems to us that the situation was not fundamentally changed because DeForte shared an office with other union officers," he said. "DeForte still could reasonably have expected that only those persons and their personal or business guests would enter the office, and that records would not be touched except with their permission or that of union higher-ups." It was irrelevant that other union officials might have consented to the search, since they had not been asked. He considered the situation analogous enough to that in Jones to require the same holding.

With the standing question answered, Harlan turned to the reasonableness of the search. As a matter of state law, a subpoena duces tecum did not allow the prosecutors to seize the documents. The state had already admitted this. Nor was the subpoena constitutionally equivalent to a search warrant, under which the seizure would have been allowed, since it was issued by the district attorney's office and not subject to independent judicial review as the Fourth Amendment required. Harlan took note of the similarity between DeForte's case and Silverthorne Lumber Co. v. United States, the case which had established the "fruit of the poisonous tree" rule excluding otherwise lawfully obtained evidence from use at trial if it was derived from unlawfully obtained evidence. In both cases, prosecutors in New York had responded to an organization's refusal to comply with a subpoena for documents by going to the premises and taking the documents themselves, an action that outraged Justice Oliver Wendell Holmes. "[T]here can be no doubt that, under this Court's past decisions, the search of DeForte's office was 'unreasonable' within the meaning of the Fourth Amendment."

=== Dissents ===
"In creating this new rule against the use of papers and documents which speak truthfully for themselves, the Court is putting up new hurdles and barriers bound to save many criminals from conviction," Black began. "I should not object to this new rule, however, if I thought it was or could be justified by the Fourth or any other constitutional amendment. But I do not think it can."

Black did not see how any of the cases cited by Harlan touched on the standing question. Silverthorne did not consider the issue since the documents were accepted as belonging to the corporation or one of its officers, and the "legitimately on premises" rule from Jones was created to resolve the dilemma it posed with the Fifth Amendment. "I must point out that this sweeping dictum is taken somewhat out of context, and cannot possibly have the literal meaning attributed to it," commented Black. "It would be quite a hyperbole, I think, to say that the Jones opinion suggested that just any person who happened to be in a house against which an unreasonable search was perpetrated could ask to have all evidence obtained by that search excluded from evidence against him." He alluded to Henderson's hypothetical question about the janitor in his opinion.

DeForte had indeed been legitimately on the premises, Black wrote, and had the majority left it at that its holding would have been sound despite his problems with Jones. But instead, by continuing, it had further highlighted the problems he had had with that decision. "This reasoning in terms of 'expectations,' however, requires conferring standing without regard to whether the agent happens to be present at the time of the search or not, a rather remarkable consequence of the statement in Jones". He speculated that the Court was planning to eventually "eliminate entirely the requirement for standing to raise a search and seizure question and to permit a search to be challenged at any time, at any place, and under all circumstances, regardless of the defendant's relationship to the person or place searched or to the things seized." Such a holding, he cautioned, would elevate the Fourth Amendment to an importance far above any other constitutional provisions.

The facts of the case, to Black, argued against the majority holding. In addition to the open layout of the office, the search was directed not at DeForte but at the local. "The police had been investigating a large conspiracy perpetrated through the union, and, at the time, were primarily interested in getting more information about the operation of the union." Since the union had raised no objections to the subpoena, it had a duty to turn over the records demanded.

Under the holding, the papers could have been returned to Local 266, and then the state could have found another, more constitutional way to obtain them and then retry the defendants. "A rule which encourages such circumvention as that is hardly the kind of principle to which this great Court should give birth." Black concluded. "I disclaim any responsibility whatever for the new rule."

White believed the majority had made too great a grant of privacy. "Although the Fourth Amendment perhaps protects the individual's private desk in a union office shared with other officers or employees," he wrote. "I dissent from the Court's extension of the protected area to the office door."

== Disposition ==
De Grandis had also been denied his habeas petition, and appealed. His case was argued before the Second Circuit while DeForte's was pending before the Supreme Court, and the appeals court delayed its decision in his case until the Supreme Court made its decision. When it did, it reversed the district court since the circumstances of the case were identical. In 1970 the New York Court of Appeals granted both defendants' requests for a new trial.

== Subsequent jurisprudence ==
Mancusi would be the only time the Court granted a habeas petition through the application of the exclusionary rule. It upheld the general permissibility of such claims the following term in Kaufman v. United States, But seven years after that, in 1976, Stone v. Powell held that state prisoners who had unsuccessfully argued the issue in state appeals would not be allowed to reargue it in federal habeas petitions beyond claims that the matter had not been fully and fairly adjudicated at the lower-court level.

The Court at first left most of the details of determining where in the workplace privacy existed to lower courts. Many were, as Mancusi had been, prosecutions where documents taken from offices were the primary evidence against employees, but the lower courts considered cases from other work environments as well. Two tests gradually emerged for determining an expectation of privacy in the workplace: the nexus test, specific to business premises and often preferred when the seized materials were work-related, and the totality test, which was best dispositive to claims of personal property at work.

=== Early lower-court interpretations ===
Since Mancusi had not gone into great detail about how DeForte had a reasonable expectation of privacy in a shared workspace, cases in lower courts resolved those issues. Personal, individual and secured spaces, such as a police officer's locker or school guidance counselor's desk drawers, were held during the 1970s to be protected by the Fourth Amendment. (Note: Both of those cases involved both public workplaces and a search for personal items unrelated to work, issues the Supreme Court had not yet considered. United States v. Speights, the case involving the police locker, also held that actual practice was more important than a stated policy in determining whether a privacy interest existed.) It was more difficult to resolve cases where those factors were not present. (Note: See, generally, Morris, Michele; "The Employment Relationship As A Source of Privacy Expectations"., 23 W. New Eng. L. Rev. 191, 227 (2001).)

In 1975 the Fifth Circuit decided United States v. Britt, a case used extensively by later courts as a counterbalance to Mancusi. There, the court upheld the mail-fraud conviction of corporate officers based on documents seized from property the corporation rented for storage purposes at a location separate from its offices. Judge Thomas Gibbs Gee distinguished the case from both Mancusi and Henzel v. United States. "In both of these cases there was a demonstrated nexus between the area searched and the work space of the defendant. That nexus is absent here." A 1983 Kansas Supreme Court decision used the same logic in holding that a murder defendant had no standing to challenge a search of vacant upper stories at the warehouse where he worked which uncovered incriminating shell casings, since he did not routinely work there.

Later holdings narrowed the nexus test so that no one factor became absolutely dispositive. In 1979 the Fourth Circuit held in United States v. Torch that the mere fact of a defendant's occasional work-related use of a warehouse searched did not establish a privacy expectation. United States v. Judd, decided by the Fifth Circuit in 1989, upheld a district court ruling that a corporate official's role in preparing seized records did not establish a privacy interest if those documents were kept in a separate office. The Second Circuit narrowed the nexus further when it upheld a conviction of a bank official in 1990. The defendant's co-ownership of the bank and the presence of the incriminating documents did not give rise to a reasonable privacy expectation, the court held, since they were kept in another employee's office and they would have been subject to routine review by federal regulators. (Note: Compare Chuang with United States v. Leary, 846 F.2d 592 (10th Cir. 1988), where a company's voluntary open-door policy was held to not defeat its officials' expectation of privacy in the workplace even though regulators visited frequently.)

The other test emerged from a dictum in Lewis Powell's concurring opinion in the 1978 Supreme Court case, Rakas v. Illinois, that courts considering the reasonableness of a privacy expectation should consider "all the surrounding circumstances." It was first applied by the First Circuit in a 1980 case, United States v. Brien. It affirmed a district court's upholding of a search in a securities fraud case that framed the issue with six questions: "(1) his [each defendant's] position in the firm; (2) did he have any ownership interest; (3) his responsibilities; (4) his power to exclude others from the area, if any; (5) did he work in the area; (6) was he present at the time of the search?" A later Ninth Circuit case referred to "the totality of the circumstances" and thus gave it its name. (Note: In that case the court found a more reasonable expectation of privacy against warrantless video surveillance of a federal agent in his office than he would have had against an actual search of the office.)

In another First Circuit case, United States v. Mancini, the totality test's consideration of other factors resulted in a different outcome than the nexus test. Federal agents searching for evidence of mayoral corruption had found a box in the attic archive at city hall, clearly marked as belonging to the mayor, with an appointment calendar that became key to the conviction. Since the box was not only marked as the mayor's but stored in a disused area of the building, segregated from other items in that area, and the mayor allowed only his chief of staff to peruse the records, the court found a reasonable expectation of privacy even though he never worked in the attic.

Mancini also turned on the defendant's authority to exclude others from the searched space, a question which took on more importance in later cases. In a case with similar circumstances to Mancusi, the Ninth Circuit decided the case differently due to a negative answer to that question. A sweep of an Oregon produce factory by Immigration and Naturalization Service agents looking for illegal aliens was upheld since those detained not only lacked a possessory interest in the property and worked in a large shared space without any space set aside for their individual use, they could not keep anyone out of the building.

=== O'Connor v. Ortega ===
It would be almost two decades before the Court heard another case involving privacy rights at work. Like Mancusi, the search at issue in O'Connor v. Ortega involved documents taken from a desk. It presented some questions of first impression for the Supreme Court. Unlike the earlier case, the workplace in question was public rather than private, and the search was undertaken not by an external law enforcement agency but by the employee's own supervisors investigating a possible violation of workplace policy. It was further distinguished by some of the seized material being personal documents unrelated to work.

The case began in 1981 when administrators at a state-run psychiatric hospital in California, suspected that Magno Ortega, the head of the hospital's residency program, had coerced money from residents to pay for an office computer. While he was on vacation that summer, they placed him on administrative leave and had security remove items from his desk, ostensibly to sort Ortega's personal property from state property, and change the lock on his door. Some of the personal documents were used to impeach a witness who testified on his behalf at a later hearing before the state personnel board where he unsuccessfully appealed his subsequent dismissal.

He filed a Section 1983 civil suit against the administrators and the state in district court. The defendants were granted summary judgement, on the grounds that the intrusion into Ortega's office was for inventory purposes and not a search. On appeal, the Ninth Circuit found differently and reversed.

Following a certiorari grant, the Supreme Court heard the case and divided 5–4, with Sandra Day O'Connor writing for four justices in the plurality, Antonin Scalia concurring and Harry Blackmun writing the dissenting opinion. All justices agreed that public employees had the same Fourth Amendment privacy expectations as their private-sector counterparts; they differed on whether the record established that those had been violated in Ortega's case. (Note: Three justices remained from the Mancusi Court; none of whom had played a substantial role in that opinion. Byron White joined Sandra Day O'Connor's plurality; William Brennan and Thurgood Marshall joined Harry Blackmun's dissent.) On remand, it took the doctor 12 more years, two trials and two more appellate holdings to win a favorable verdict.

While its primary question was whether public employees enjoyed privacy protections, and the holding allowed public employees' supervisors needed merely reasonable suspicion to commence a valid investigatory search, (Note: Work-related searches, such as the retrieval of a document or tool from a desk or locker, were held constitutional.) O'Connor added some clarifications to Mancusi that lower court justices found useful. Justice O'Connor defined the workplace as "includ[ing] those areas and items that are related to work and are generally within the employer's control."

But there was, as there had not been in Mancusi, a distinction between personal and work-related items in the workplace, affecting the privacy expectations in context. "[A] photograph placed in a desk or a letter posted on an employee bulletin board," for instance, were personal items that nevertheless became part of the workplace context by virtue of that placement. But packed luggage for a weekend trip or a handbag did not come under a reduced privacy expectation by being brought to work, O'Connor concluded.

Considerations of privacy must also take into account "operational realities" of the workplace in question, O'Connor said. "An office is seldom a private enclave free from entry by supervisors, other employees, and business and personal invitees. Instead, in many cases offices are continually entered by fellow employees and other visitors during the workday for conferences, consultations, and other work-related visits." As a result of their openness to the public, in fact, some workplaces might not allow any reasonable expectation of privacy.

What, to O'Connor, distinguished public from private workplaces under the Fourth Amendment was the government's interest as an employer in running an efficient operation. She quoted the Court's holding in Connick v. Myers, a case involving the First Amendment rights of public employees, that "government offices could not function if every employment decision became a constitutional matter". Therefore, work-related searches were incident to the primary business of government and thus needed no justification; searches to investigate non-criminal employee misconduct need only meet the reasonable suspicion standard outlined in Terry v. Ohio.

Scalia, in his concurrence, attacked O'Connor for articulating an unclear standard and leaving its nuances to future courts. The difference between a public and private employer was dispositive only to the question of whether a search was reasonable, not whether the Fourth Amendment was violated. He would have held that any search reasonable for a private employer would be reasonable for a public employer as well. Blackmun's dissent found the search of Ortega's office to have been clearly investigatory and thus the Ninth Circuit should have been affirmed.

=== After O'Connor ===
O'Connor's clarifications preceded a period in which the boundaries between workspace and personal space became less distinct and in some cases began to overlap. In large part this was due to the increasing use of personal computers and the rise of the Internet. Two cases in the decades after O'Connor particularly reflected this.

The nexus and totality tests collided in a 1998 Tenth Circuit decision, United States v. Anderson. As part of an FBI child pornography sting operation, the defendant, James Anderson, had been sent what he had been led to believe were videotapes of children with sexually explicit content (they were actually blank). Agents had him under surveillance as he picked up the package, expecting him to take it to his home, for which they already had a search warrant. Instead, he took it to the offices of the company where he was an executive, which were otherwise deserted as it was the Saturday of a Fourth of July weekend.

Concerned that he would realize law enforcement was involved when he discovered the tapes were blank and destroy other evidence that might be present, the agents decided exigent circumstances existed and forced their way into the building. They found Anderson in an unused room where he had drawn the blinds, placed a towel over them and closed the door, preparing to watch the videotape. After confessing and signing a statement that he was aware of his Miranda rights, he consented to a search of his office that produced other child pornography.

At his trial, the district court suppressed the confession and all evidence seized after the FBI entered the building. On appeal, the three judges divided. Mary Beck Briscoe wrote for herself and John Carbone Porfilio that the nexus test, under which, as Paul Kelly wrote in dissent, Anderson had no expectation of privacy, was not sufficient to decide this case. "[W]e do not believe the fact that a defendant does or does not work in a particular area should categorically control his ability to challenge a warrantless search of that area" she wrote. "Instead, the better approach is to examine all of the circumstances of the working environment and the relevant search", as she read the Supreme Court to have done in Mancusi.

Briscoe considered it more relevant that Anderson had taken steps to maintain his privacy within the room and that the items were under his immediate control and of a personal, non-business-related nature. (Note: The search was also held unconstitutional because the government had not met its burden of proof that exigent circumstances existed.) Kelly argued in dissent that the majority's logic would have extended Anderson's expectation of privacy to the entire office suite he had chosen to isolate himself and watch his videos. In footnotes, he and Briscoe disagreed about the relevance of Mancini.

Anderson had been tracked from his presence online, and the increasing use of the Internet at work, sometimes for personal matters, near the end of the century posed new issues. The Fourth Circuit found the remote search of an employee computer valid in another child-porn case, United States v. Simons, since the Internet use policy defeated any expectation of privacy. A more complicated case concerning privacy expectations around personal Internet use at work confronted the Ninth Circuit in United States v. Ziegler.

The case began in 2001 with a tip to the FBI from a Montana Internet service provider that someone at Frontline Processing, an online-payments processing company, had accessed child-porn websites from a company computer. An FBI agent, James Kennedy, followed up by contacting officials at the company's information technology (IT) department who verified the report, traced it to Brian Ziegler, the company's director of operations, and found further incriminating evidence in his computer's cache. A copy of the hard drive's contents was made, although it was disputed whether the IT employees did this on their own initiative or at Kennedy's behest. In order to do this two IT employees entered Ziegler's locked office after work hours. The copies made, and the original computer, were turned over to the FBI later.

At trial in 2004 Ziegler moved to have the evidence from his hard drive suppressed, arguing that the IT employees, despite their ability and duty to monitor other employees' Internet usage, could not consent and had not consented to do a physical search and seizure in his office on the government's behalf. It was denied, and he later pleaded guilty to a lesser charge as part of a plea bargain in 2005. He then appealed. Judge Diarmuid O'Scannlain upheld the district court, writing that due to both the monitoring and social norms regarding privacy expectations on an employer-owned computer, Ziegler had no privacy interest in the computer and thus could not contest the intrusion into his office based on information obtained remotely from that computer.

Ziegler petitioned for an en banc rehearing. In response, the original panel withdrew its first opinion and issued a newer, longer one, acknowledging as the first had not the "seminal" importance of Mancusi in establishing an employee's expectation of privacy at work. This time it held that Ziegler did indeed have a privacy interest in his office, but left undisturbed its holding that Frontline's consent overrode that.

Another circuit judge moved sua sponte for a rehearing en banc. The motion failed to attract enough votes, but 11 judges dissented, arguing that office politics at Frontline and statements in the record made it unclear whether there was or could have been consent, and that even if there was that was not enough to overcome Ziegler's privacy rights. In a separate opinion, one dissenter, Chief Judge Alex Kozinski, accused the original panel of "plucking consent out of its judicial top hat ... Appellate review is not a magic wand and we undermine public confidence in the judicial process when we make it look like it is." The original panel in turn accused the dissenters of "post hoc revisionism" that adequately justified their original positions.

=== Ontario v. Quon ===
In 2010, more than two decades after O'Connor, the Court decided to take another workplace-privacy case, again from an administrative investigation in a public-employment context and . Reflecting cases like Ziegler that had increasingly appeared on appellate dockets, Ontario v. Quon also involved modern personal telecommunications technology. It had worked its way up to the justices from the Ninth Circuit as Quon v. Arch Wireless, a case brought by police officers disciplined for sexually explicit text messages exchanged on department-issued pagers, and the recipients of those text messages.

A lieutenant had told the defendant officers, members of the department SWAT team who were routinely exceeding the monthly character limits on the pagers, that despite a department policy allowing only light personal use of the pagers he would not audit the pager messages as long as they reimbursed the department for its overage fees. The lieutenant and chief later wondered if the character limit was artificially low, and ordered an audit and transcripts from the pager provider, limited to those sent during work, which disclosed that most messages had been personal and sometimes explicit.

The Ninth Circuit had held the audit an unconstitutional search on the grounds that there were less intrusive ways of obtaining the same information. After a petition for en banc was denied, the Court granted certiorari. Since it was the first telecommunications privacy case to reach the nation's highest court, its possible holding was eagerly anticipated.

Ultimately, the Court set no new precedent, unanimously reversing the Ninth Circuit on the grounds that it had never held the "least intrusive means" test for searches valid. Anthony Kennedy wrote a lengthy majority opinion that concluded the audit of the pagers was reasonably work-related, and declined to establish any new standards for Internet privacy since the technology was still "in flux" and social expectations around it were insufficiently settled. He specifically cited the lag between Olmstead and Katz as an example to avoid repeating.

This reluctance was criticized by Antonin Scalia in a concurrence as "a feeble excuse for dereliction of duty". Editorials in major newspapers praised this restraint, but later The New York Times ran an article calling the decision "almost aggressively unhelpful" to lower courts. Eleventh Circuit judge Frank Hull similarly said Quon had "a marked lack of clarity" when withdrawing and reissuing a previous panel decision controversially holding that there was no reasonable expectation of privacy over the contents of e-mail.

== Analysis and commentary ==
Michele Morris, an Akron, Ohio, employment lawyer, believes both the nexus and totality tests have proved deficient at protecting privacy at work, and in so doing undermined what the Court sought to accomplish in Mancusi. Instead, she argues, courts should look to the relationships among employees, and between employees and supervisors. "The nexus test ignores the realities of workplace delegation of duties", she writes.

It does not consider that the process of work delegation may create several parties with an interest in a document: the person who initiates the project, the person who actually prepares the document, and the person who has custody of the document. Consistent with the Supreme Court's holding in Mancusi v. DeForte, all parties are likely to have an expectation of privacy that the document will only be shared with those within the workplace who are entitled to access.

The totality test also, in her opinion, fails because while it considers, as the nexus test does not, an employee's efforts to exclude others from a space instead of their ability or authority to do so. "An employee's right to exclude is a direct result of the employment relationship, whereas efforts to exclude may not be." If this mistaken emphasis continued, she fears, private-sector workers will be under the same reasonable-suspicion standard the Court put public employees under in O'Connor.

Courts have already, Morris observes, given employment relationships some weight in assessing the validity of a search. (Note: She points (222 note 207) to two cases. In United States v. Reeves, 730 F.2d 1189 (8th Cir., 1984), the Eighth Circuit held that a deputy sheriff's "common authority" with the defendant sheriff over the sheriff's office validated the search, and in United States v. Buettner-Janusch, 646 F.2d 759 (2nd Cir. 1981), the Second Circuit held that the defendant professor's graduate assistants had not only the same common authority but permission to use any aspect of the laboratory equipment gave them the right to consent to a search of it.) "[T]he courts have erroneously focused on the Supreme Court's Mancusi decision as standing for the principal that an office is a place in which privacy expectations exist, even where it is shared by others," Morris writes. "By focusing on that aspect of Mancusi, the courts have failed to apply its more significant recognition that the employment relationship creates a privacy expectation in relation to outsiders, not fellow employees who were entitled to access or persons given access by those employees."

The decreasing distinctions between work and home make the problems created by the two existing tests even more compelling. In 1998's Minnesota v. Carter, the Supreme Court had restored the convictions of two men originally observed bagging cocaine through a third man's apartment window, holding that they did not have the privacy expectation usually accorded guests since the sole purpose of their visit was to prepare the cocaine for sale, making their presence on the property purely commercial in nature. "It is not too far a reach to extend this rationale to deny Fourth Amendment rights to business guests in one's home for a dinner party or to guests at a Tupperware party". What privacy expectations, Morris wondered, would courts apply to people who work out of their homes? And could that result in a general lowering of privacy expectations in the home, where it has traditionally been most protected?

Morris proposes that, in analyzing a privacy claim, courts first define what, in the specific instance, constituted the workplace, and then within that space delineating the public and private areas. After doing so, it could consider to which employees the item or items seized are related to through employment. "An employee who delegates work to another would no longer lose Fourth Amendment protection simply by failing to perform the task herself", she writes. "Likewise, the person to whom the work is delegated is protected regardless of whether she has the authority to retain the materials in her possession." Where a personal item was concerned, the employee would have to demonstrate privacy efforts independent of the employer, such as efforts to exclude coworkers from the item.

Peter Winn, a federal prosecutor in Washington and lecturer at the University of Washington School of Law, takes note in a history of the formulation of the reasonable expectation of privacy standard established in Katz that Mancusi was its first application to a later case. He finds it interesting that while Harlan first articulated it in his Katz concurrency as a two-part test with a subjective and objective component, in Mancusi he, like other judges after him, refers only to the objective aspect. "Perhaps [in Katz], Justice Harlan felt the subjective component of the test was still needed to mirror the old trespass element that an intrusion lack permission," he speculated.

== See also ==
- List of United States Supreme Court cases, volume 392
- List of United States Supreme Court cases by the Warren Court
