= Mancusi =

Mancusi is a surname. Notable people with the surname include:

- Guido Mancusi (born 1966), Austrian-Italian conductor and composer
- Mari Mancusi, American author
- Ursula Mancusi Ungaro (born 1951), American judge

== See also ==
- Mancusi v. DeForte, is a decision of the United States Supreme Court on privacy and the Fourth Amendment
