= Volume control =

Volume control can refer to:

- Volume controlled continuous mandatory ventilation
- Potentiometer, a feature on audio equipment for adjusting the sound level
  - Remote control
  - Universal remote

== See also ==
- Volume and Control Model, in sociology
