= Customerization =

Customerization is the customization of products or services through personal interaction between a company and its customers. A company is customerized when it is able to establish a dialogue with individual customers and respond by customizing its products, services, and messages on a one-to-one basis. CUSTOMERization means identifying and serving what you perceive as your optimal customers. Customerization requires a company to shift its marketing model from seller-oriented to buyer-oriented. The goal is to help customers better identify what they want. Customerization enables companies to have the ability to adapt personalization and one-to-one marketing initiatives for the digital marketing environment. Customerization uses a “build-to-order” mass customization process to deliver a product or service that fits the needs of the customer. It is a critical aspect of the emerging new marketing paradigm.

The word "customerization" is a neologism, defined as the combination of operational customization and marketing customization.

The ability to gather information from and about the customer is an important aspect of customerization. It requires interaction between the customer and the company, to receive feedback, revise and respond. Customerization typically results in improved quality and innovation. Customerization programs have a generic set of activities and a common philosophy, but the specifics of their implementation vary for each unit or organization. Customerization combines mass customization and the elicitation of individual customer demand information by involving customers. It is regarded as the next generation of mass customization. CUSTOMERization means identifying and serving what you perceive as your optimal customers.

Both mass customization and customerization are attempts to provide products and services to better meet the needs of customers, and rely on the Internet as a vehicle for implementing this concept in an economically friendly way.

Customerization combines mass customization with customized marketing and empowers consumers to design the products and services of their choice. In contrast to mass customization and personalization, customerization does not require a lot of prior information about the customer. In effect, customerization redefines the relationship between a firm and its customers. The customer designs the product and service while the firm “rents” out to the customer its manufacturing logistics and other resources.

== Strategies ==
Customerization and other major trends, such as the growing influence of globalization and the Internet, have large implications for marketing and business strategies, as well as for the operations of the firm of the 21st century.

Customerization requires an effective integration of marketing, operations, R&D, finance, and information. It also requires a reinvention of the firm’s orientation and processes, especially as they relate to R&D, operations, marketing and finance, and changes to the organizational architecture required to support this integration. The rise of the Internet does not replace standard broadcast advertising, but allows for interactive communication with customers.

Customerization is not a strategy that replaces traditional mass marketing, but offers additional competitive options in developing an overall marketing strategy. The challenge facing the firm is, therefore, how to design and manage a customerization process along with mass-produced products and services.

== Flexibility ==
Firms that exhibit higher flexibility may help enhance customerization in many ways. Flexibility can meet customers’ vastly different demands, which may reduce negative impacts on demand changes and capacity fluctuation. This allows the firm the ability to use critical resources to produce exactly what customers are looking for, and the ability to target customer groups. Flexibility also means quick responses to demand changes. In the co-creation process, flexibility provides a firm with the agility to make only the products that customers want, via communication with customers. This makes flexibility a critical route to customerization. Co-creation practices are well established in business-to-business contexts and are increasingly applied in business-to-consumer markets.

== Challenges of customerization ==
Customerization may raise challenges related to obtaining information from customers, enhanced customer expectations, pricing issues related to customized offerings, and the required changes to the entire marketing and business strategy of a firm.

Effective customerization requires the exchange of information and knowledge between companies and customers. It requires customers to be willing to share attitudes, preferences, and purchase patterns with the company on an ongoing basis. With increasing online competition and concerns about privacy, companies need to design privacy guidelines and incentive structures carefully to facilitate the knowledge exchange between themselves and their customers.

== See also ==
- Customization
- Personalization
- Standardization
- Personalized marketing
