= User modeling =

Creating a data structure representing a user

User modeling is the subdivision of human–computer interaction which describes the process of building up and modifying a conceptual understanding of the user. The main goal of user modeling is customization and adaptation of systems to the user's specific needs. The system needs to "say the 'right' thing at the 'right' time in the 'right' way". To do so it needs an internal representation of the user. Another common purpose is modeling specific kinds of users, including modeling of their skills and declarative knowledge, for use in automatic software-tests. User-models can thus serve as a cheaper alternative to user testing but should not replace user testing.

== Background ==
A user model is the collection and categorization of personal data associated with a specific user. A user model is a (data) structure that is used to capture certain characteristics about an individual user, and a user profile is the actual representation in a given user model. The process of obtaining the user profile is called user modeling. Therefore, it is the basis for any adaptive changes to the system's behavior. Which data is included in the model depends on the purpose of the application. It can include personal information such as users' names and ages, their interests, their skills and knowledge, their goals and plans, their preferences and their dislikes or data about their behavior and their interactions with the system.

There are different design patterns for user models, though often a mixture of them is used.

- Static user models

Static user models are the most basic kinds of user models. Once the main data is gathered they are normally not changed again, they are static. Shifts in users' preferences are not registered and no learning algorithms are used to alter the model.

- Dynamic user models

Dynamic user models allow a more up to date representation of users. Changes in their interests, their learning progress or interactions with the system are noticed and influence the user models. The models can thus be updated and take the current needs and goals of the users into account.

- Stereotype based user models

Stereotype based user models are based on demographic statistics. Based on the gathered information users are classified into common stereotypes. The system then adapts to this stereotype. The application therefore can make assumptions about a user even though there might be no data about that specific area, because demographic studies have shown that other users in this stereotype have the same characteristics. Thus, stereotype based user models mainly rely on statistics and do not take into account that personal attributes might not match the stereotype. However, they allow predictions about a user even if there is rather little information about him or her.

- Highly adaptive user models

Highly adaptive user models try to represent one particular user and therefore allow a very high adaptivity of the system. In contrast to stereotype based user models they do not rely on demographic statistics but aim to find a specific solution for each user. Although users can take great benefit from this high adaptivity, this kind of model needs to gather a lot of information first.

== Data gathering ==
Information about users can be gathered in several ways. There are three main methods:

- Asking for specific facts while (first) interacting with the system

Mostly this kind of data gathering is linked with the registration process. While registering users are asked for specific facts, their likes and dislikes and their needs. Often the given answers can be altered afterwards.

- Learning users' preferences by observing and interpreting their interactions with the system

In this case users are not asked directly for their personal data and preferences, but this information is derived from their behavior while interacting with the system. The ways they choose to accomplish a tasks, the combination of things they takes interest in, these observations allow inferences about a specific user. The application dynamically learns from observing these interactions. Different machine learning algorithms may be used to accomplish this task.

- A hybrid approach which asks for explicit feedback and alters the user model by adaptive learning

This approach is a mixture of the ones above. Users have to answer specific questions and give explicit feedback. Furthermore, their interactions with the system are observed and the derived information are used to automatically adjust the user models.

Though the first method is a good way to quickly collect main data it lacks the ability to automatically adapt to shifts in users' interests. It depends on the users' readiness to give information and it is unlikely that they are going to edit their answers once the registration process is finished. Therefore, there is a high likelihood that the user models are not up to date. However, this first method allows the users to have full control over the collected data about them. It is their decision which information they are willing to provide. This possibility is missing in the second method. Adaptive changes in a system that learns users' preferences and needs only by interpreting their behavior might appear a bit opaque to the users, because they cannot fully understand and reconstruct why the system behaves the way it does. Moreover, the system is forced to collect a certain amount of data before it is able to predict the users' needs with the required accuracy. Therefore, it takes a certain learning time before a user can benefit from adaptive changes. However, afterwards these automatically adjusted user models allow a quite accurate adaptivity of the system. The hybrid approach tries to combine the advantages of both methods. Through collecting data by directly asking its users it gathers a first stock of information which can be used for adaptive changes. By learning from the users' interactions it can adjust the user models and reach more accuracy. Yet, the designer of the system has to decide, which of these information should have which amount of influence and what to do with learned data that contradicts some of the information given by a user.

== System adaptation ==
Once a system has gathered information about a user it can evaluate that data by preset analytical algorithm and then start to adapt to the user's needs. These adaptations may concern every aspect of the system's behavior and depend on the system's purpose. Information and functions can be presented according to the user's interests, knowledge or goals by displaying only relevant features, hiding information the user does not need, making proposals what to do next and so on. One has to distinguish between adaptive and adaptable systems. In an adaptable system the user can manually change the system's appearance, behavior or functionality by actively selecting the corresponding options. Afterwards the system will stick to these choices. In an adaptive system a dynamic adaption to the user is automatically performed by the system itself, based on the built user model. Thus, an adaptive system needs ways to interpret information about the user in order to make these adaptations. One way to accomplish this task is implementing rule-based filtering. In this case a set of IF... THEN... rules is established that covers the knowledge base of the system. The IF-conditions can check for specific user-information and if they match the THEN-branch is performed which is responsible for the adaptive changes. Another approach is based on collaborative filtering. In this case information about a user is compared to that of other users of the same systems. Thus, if characteristics of the current user match those of another, the system can make assumptions about the current user by presuming that he or she is likely to have similar characteristics in areas where the model of the current user is lacking data. Based on these assumption the system then can perform adaptive changes.

== Usages ==
- Adaptive hypermedia: In an adaptive hypermedia system the displayed content and the offered hyperlinks are chosen on basis of users' specific characteristics, taking their goals, interests, knowledge and abilities into account. Thus, an adaptive hypermedia system aims to reduce the "lost in hyperspace" syndrome by presenting only relevant information.
- Adaptive educational hypermedia: Being a subdivision of adaptive hypermedia the main focus of adaptive educational hypermedia lies on education, displaying content and hyperlinks corresponding to the user's knowledge on the field of study.
- Intelligent tutoring system: Unlike adaptive educational hypermedia systems intelligent tutoring systems are stand-alone systems. Their aim is to help students in a specific field of study. To do so, they build up a user model where they store information about abilities, knowledge and needs of the user. The system can now adapt to this user by presenting appropriate exercises and examples and offering hints and help where the user is most likely to need them.
- Expert systems: Expert systems are computer systems that emulate the decision-making ability of a human expert in order to help the user solving a problem in a specific area. Step by step they ask questions to identify the current problem and to find a solution. User models can be used to adapt to the current user's knowledge, differentiating between experts and novices. The system can assume, that experienced users are able to understand and answer more complex questions than someone who is new to the topic. Therefore, it can adjust the used vocabulary and the type of question which are presented to the user, thus reducing the steps needed to find a solution.
- Recommender system: The basic idea of recommender systems is to present a selection of items to the user which best fit his or her needs. This selection can be based on items the user has bookmarked, rated, bought, recently viewed, etc. Recommender systems are often used in e-commerce but may also cover areas like social networks, websites, news, etc.
- User-Simulation: Since user modeling allows the system to hold an internal representation of a specific user, different types of users can be simulated by artificially modeling them. Common types are "experts" or "novices" on the scope of the system or the usage of the system. Based on these characteristics user tests can be simulated. The SUPPLE project at University of Washington and the Inclusive User Model at University of Cambridge simulates interaction for users with visual, hearing and motor impairment.

== Standards ==
A certain number of representation formats and standards are available for representing the users in computer systems, such as:

- IMS-LIP (IMS – Learner Information Packaging, used in e-learning)
- HR-XML (used in human resource management)
- JXDM (Justice with the Global Justice Extensible Markup)
- Europass (the Europass online CV)

== See also ==
- Personalization
- Cognitive model
- User profile
- Identity management

== External references ==
- User Modeling and User-Adapted Interaction (UMUAI) The Journal of Personalization Research
- CogTool Project at CMU
- User Modeling Conference 2007
- User Modeling Conference 2018
- Hypertext 2018
