= Privacy and the US government =

Privacy and the United States government consists of enacted legislation, funding of regulatory agencies, enforcement of court precedents, creation of congressional committees, evaluation of judicial decisions, and implementation of executive orders in response to major court cases and technological change. Because the United States government is composed of three distinct branches governed by both the separation of powers and checks and balances, the change in privacy practice can be separated relative to the actions performed by the three branches.

- The purpose of the legislative branch: To perform congressional actions that clarify what constitutes privacy tort, to outline punishments for those who violate privacy law, and to protect the people's “right to privacy” through regulation.
- The purpose of judiciary branch: To examine individual privacy issues and create widespread precedent that both protects and infringes upon existing personal privacy law vested within Congressional legislation and constitutional amendments.
- The purpose of executive branch: To pursue actions that help emphasize certain issues and expedite the process regarding particular policy through platform politics, executive orders, and pushing and signing of bills into law.

Congress, the Supreme Court, and the Presidency work closely with one another to help define privacy law in the United States and often build upon each other when improving privacy practice and regulation. Prior to implementation of these branch actions, the notion of privacy rights can be traced back to the First, Third, Fourth, Fifth, Ninth and Fourteenth Amendments of the United States Constitution.

== Privacy in the US Constitution ==
The Constitution of the United States serves as one of the most influential founding documents of the United States federal government. The United States Constitution's primary purpose is to frame the structure and function of the three branches of government; however, its amendments are commonly used as evidence for the notion of a legal right to privacy.

=== First Amendment ===
The First Amendment states the government cannot violate the individual's right to " freedom of speech, or of the press". In the past, this amendment primarily served as a legal justification for infringement on an individual's right to privacy; as a result, the government was unable to clearly outline a protective scope of the right to speech versus the right to privacy. The most common cases through which individual private privacy is infringed upon is through unregulated freedom of speech and press which includes defamation speech under the First Amendment. Initially, in the case of criminal libel and press defamation cases, the Court often protected the individual's right to speech; however, as protection of privacy became a larger political issue, the Courts and Congress realized that the information must be "well-informed" to fall within the protection of the First Amendment especially when another's right to privacy is involved.

=== Third Amendment ===
The Third Amendment protects against the sanctity and privacy within the home, by protecting against the quartering of soldiers. This justifies personal private property and protections against governing bodies usurping power and private property during times of war. Although not used that often, it ensures protection of the right to privacy of the home over federal use.

=== Fourth Amendment ===
The Fourth Amendment states that “the right of the people to be secure in their persons, houses, papers and effects against unreasonable searches and seizures shall not be violated”. Therefore, the Fourth Amendment gives a constitutional right to security for people's "private places, and private things". Most privacy violation court cases (prior to explicit court precedents and legislation) relied on the "unreasonable" verbiage as the basis for there arguments of infringement of privacy. This suggests that whenever a search or seizure was deemed unreasonable the seized evidence was considered unlawful and could not be used in the trial after arresting and booking the plaintiffs. This amendment required law officials to obtain a warrant prior to searching the client if there was no justification for "reasonable cause". The government previously used privacy and intrusiveness as the measure through which to determine the "unreasonableness"; however now they use a combination of the "expectation of privacy" through “societal knowledge”, and legislation to determine the need of warrantless searches within varying contexts and environments.

=== Fifth Amendment ===
The Fifth Amendment protects against involuntary self-incrimination during trial. Often known as pleading the fifth, this right allows individuals the right to remain silent and maintain a sense of privacy when being interrogated by the state. This amendment provides security towards both "the sanctity of a man's home" and "the privacies of his/her life" by protecting the privacy of an individual's personal information.

=== Ninth Amendment ===
Even though certain rights are not clearly outlined within the constitution, the Ninth Amendment states that these unenumerated rights are still protected by the government. This provides a legal justification through which to consider the right to privacy as a fundamental right of the individual. The Fourteenth Amendment even provides lawyers with the legal justification, in the Supreme Court, to protect an entities right to privacy. Post World War II, this amendment was used to help protect individual liberty; for example, in the Griswold v. United States court case it was used to broadly justify the right to privacy not mentioned within the first eight amendments.

=== Fourteenth Amendment ===
The Fourteenth Amendment has embedded within it the due process clause and equal protection clauses, which state that no state shall "deprive any person of life, liberty, or property, without due process", this has been interpreted to serve as a protection of privacy within the family, marriage, motherhood, procreation, and child rearing. This amendment introduced natural law to privacy rights, allowing court cases to "reasonably weight the interests involved" when analyzing the free exercise of one's privacy rights. Therefore, court cases involving Fourteenth Amendment privacy rights often asks two questions: Does the situation infringe on the plaintiff's right and is there a state interest that justifies the defendant's argument.

== Privacy and the Judicial Branch ==
The purpose of the judicial branch in the United States government is to act as a regulatory agent that interprets laws relative to the U.S. Constitution. The judicial branch consists of a federal court system with a final level of appeal of the United States Supreme Court. The Supreme Court can influence an individual's or entity's right to privacy through judicial interpretation of isolated court cases that explore privacy infringement. The privacy cases that reach the Supreme Court ultimately lead to Supreme Court decisions and precedent that modify the accepted privacy rights within the country. While it is still unclear whether Congress or Court decisions come first when making strides in the arena of privacy protections, court precedents play a major role in the way privacy is viewed and interpreted by other federal agencies, companies, and individuals alike. Privacy laws and cases get blurred when privacy is applied to the Internet or an online situation. Social media, websites, and mobile device apps are all examples of various components of the internet that could be subject to privacy violations or court review.

=== Griswold v. Connecticut (1965) ===
When Estelle Griswold, Executive Director of the Planned Parenthood League of Connecticut, and Dr. C. Lee Buxton, a medical professor at Yale Medical School were arrested for aiding in the dissemination of contraceptive to married couples in violation of Connecticut statutes, the Court held that these Connecticut statutes outlawing the use of contraceptive were unconstitutional. This case was a large victory for privacy rights, because it held that the Connecticut statute outlawing the dissemination of contraceptives to unmarried couples as unconstitutional because it violated a constitutional right of privacy. Justice Douglas concluded that a combination of the First, Third, Fourth, Fifth, and Ninth Amendments led to the Griswold v. Connecticut decision of "marital privacy".

=== Katz v. United States (1967) ===
When Katz was recorded by a recording device placed by government agents in the public telephone booth, the Court held that the charges against him were based on the government's infringement on his right to privacy through an illegal "search and seizure" outlined in the Fourth Amendment. Prior to this court case the Fourth Amendment was often used to protect against the right of privacy to “material things”, however, this court decision overturned the prior precedent from the Olmstead v. United States decision.

==== Katz Test ====
Established in the court case Katz v. United States, this test currently governs Fourth Amendment scope not outlined within legislation. Derived from Justice Harlan's concurring opinion, the Katz test has two parts: the first asks whether the person exhibited and understood the expectation of privacy, and the second asks if this expectations can be considered "reasonable" and commonly held by the remainder of society.

=== Roe v Wade (1973) ===
After being unable to legally and illegally obtain an abortion in a clinic in Texas, the plaintiff decided to argue against the constitutionality of the Texas statute that outlawed abortions that were not required for the safety of the mother. The plaintiff argued that the statute violated her right to privacy under the Ninth Amendment. Working off of the Griswold v Connecticut decision, the Supreme court decided that under the due process clause of the Fourteenth Amendment, a woman had a "fundamental" right to abort a pregnancy, given she does so within a specified time period. Roe v Wade marked a major advancement for privacy rights.

=== Cox Broadcasting Corp v. Cohn (1975) ===
Eight months after the rape and death of a 17-year-old girl, a broadcasting corporation revealed the unidentified victim on national television without the permission of the father. The Georgia Supreme court cited that the right to privacy of the family preceded the right to freedom of the press and concurred in favor of the plaintiff. The U.S. Supreme Court however later overruled this decision stating that the press's First Amendment right still applied. The Supreme Court was heavily influenced by the article The Right to Privacy in this Court decision, and would later use the verbiage of the article in other court cases dealing with privacy.

==== The Right To Privacy ====
The Right to Privacy, written by Samuel Warren and Louis Brandeis, heavily influenced the Supreme Court's decision in the case of Cox Broadcasting Corp v Cohn at the State level. Often considered the catalyst to privacy rights being introduced to the social consciousness, The Right to Privacy borrowed the phrase of Judge Cooley that privacy was the right “to be let alone”. Warren and Brandeis conceived the need for such a right through a combination of prestige and persuasion. During the time of this article, however, courts were more concerned with the protection of the press through the First Amendment rights, then the use of a person's identity for advertisement.This article influenced the Cox Broadcasting Corp v Cohn decision by suggesting that the plaintiff should be allowed to sue for damages if the plaintiff's identity was used prior to written or verbal consent in advance of publication or use of their imagery.

=== Rakas v. Illinois (1978) ===
Rakas v. Illinois had a dramatic effect on the scope of the Fourth Amendment "unreasonable" searches. Despite driving a car having a different license number, containing double the number of required passengers, and having a different year and color then the one described in the robbery report, police officers stopped and searched the car of the plaintiffs and found a sawed-off rifle and a box of shells. The police later arrested and charged the two men in the car as the robbers. While it some argue it was obvious that the officers did not have probable cause, the court ruled that because the defendants denied owning the property, the search conducted could be used as evidence in the trial against them. This negatively impacted Fourth Amendment privacy rights as it limited the scope of privacy by suggesting the Fourth Amendment protected property instead of privacy

=== Lawrence v. Texas (2003) ===
Overruling the earlier Bowers v. Hardwick decision, Lawrence v. Texas allowed LGBTQ+ communities the liberty, privacy, and right to intimacy within the home. This court case called into question the constitutionality of the Texas sodomy statute, and found that the plaintiffs were entitled to a private life. While some argued that the right to privacy should not include the right to engage in consensual homosexual activity, the court ruled that based on the Fourth and Ninth Amendment the plaintiffs are entitled to privacy, liberty, and dignity.

=== Concerns and Controversies ===
The controversy behind the right to privacy through judicial review is often related to the merits of "interpretive" and "non interpretive" modes of judicial review. Some people argue that the use of judicial review to change privacy law is undemocratic, because the precedents created by Supreme Court decisions are decided by unelected Supreme Court justices. After the Roe v. Wade decision, some argued that the decision was an "illegitimate resurrection of the substantive due process doctrine of Lochner v. New York". Similarly, people who wish to follow a strict interpretation of the Constitution argue that the first privacy case, Griswold v. Connecticut can serve as a form of judicial legislation for a right not explicitly stated in the United States Constitution. Another cause of concern for domestic courts is how they handle international policy; for example how should the Supreme court handle cases regarding foreign countries that believe American companies, such as Facebook, violate their privacy practices.

== Privacy and the Legislative Branch ==
The primary purpose of the legislative branch, also known as the United States Congress, is to pass legislation that is approved by both parts of its bicameral legislature. This bicameral system consists of the House of Representatives and the Senate. Congress performs several functions some of which include setting a budgetary policy and providing legislative oversight; however it has primarily impacted individual and entity privacy rights through the passing of privacy bills. The privacy tort passed by the United States Congress creates a Congressional timeline of privacy rights institutionalized through written word. Considering the word privacy itself only appeared in Congressional hearings post the 90th Congressional Committee, the conception of privacy rights in Congress was introduced relatively recently. This section looks at how the legislation passed by Congress and the regulatory agencies created by Congress form a clear timeline outlining the changing perspective of privacy rights relative to a changing technological world.

=== Federal Trade Commission Act of 1914 (FTCA) ===
The Federal Trade Commission Act of 1914, also known as the FTC Act, not only created the regulatory agency of the Federal Trade Commission, but also authorizes the FTC (Federal Trade Commission) to levy penalties on approved companies found violating their own written policies and deceiving consumers. By protecting against "deceptive acts and practices", the Federal Trade Commission has gained large oversight over what they consider illegal practices, allowing them to create industry-wide regulation reformation instead of individual company or instance based changes. Under the FTC Act, the FTC is also given the power to conduct investigations, and create reports that they send to congress for future legislation recommendations.

=== Privacy Act of 1974 ===
Some of the first legislation that outlined protecting and controlling dissemination of private personal information, the Privacy Act of 1974 was a response to the use of social security numbers to access user information. The act allows users to gain control of the information collected about them and even pursue legal measures if the company discloses any of his/her records without his/her written consent. The company collecting the information was held liable to make sure the information collected was accurate, provide access to the client to amend discrepancies, and ensure the information was not only recorded systematically but also easily accessible. These limitations were included as a result of the Fair Information Practices Principles (FIPP) which include notice/awareness, choice/consent, access/participation, integrity/security, and lastly enforcement/redress, all prevalent within the roles outlined by the government to companies keeping a system of records. The Privacy Act of 1974 was heavily influenced by William Prosser's reformulation of privacy rights in his outline.

==== Prosser's Invasion of privacy torts ====
Prosser restructured invasions of privacy into four separate torts: Intrusion upon the plaintiff's seclusion or solitude, public disclosure of embarrassing private facts, publicity which places the plaintiff in a false light, and appropriation of the plaintiff's name or likeness for advantage. This is currently regarded as a form of personality/informational privacy rights, privacy rights that protect against unauthorized use of an individual's name, likeness, confidences, compositions, and life history for publicity, in addition to sharing of autonomous decision-making relating to marriage, abortion, childbearing and childrearing. Most regard this framework as the basis for legislation such as the Privacy Act of 1974.

=== Health Insurance Portability and Accountability Act (HIPAA) ===
The Health Insurance Portability and Accountability Act, was initially written to amend the Internal Revenue Code of 1986, by clarifying additional improvements to health insurance coverage. The act stated that within group and individual coverage, companies could not waste, abuse, or fraud its customers of health insurance and health care delivery. The act itself is composed of two titles: Title 1 focuses on ensuring health insurance is portable and accessible to citizens even during times of unemployment, while Title 2 looks at the accountability of health care professionals when dealing with health information tampering, fraud, and abuse, and even outlines criminal penalties for malpractice. Title 2 has large implications on information privacy protection within the healthcare industry due to the Administrative Simplifications (AS) embedded within Title 2 of the Act. One such Administrative Simplification, is the Privacy Rule which ensures that protected health information (PHI) remains protected.

==== Health Information Technology for Economic and Clinical Health Act ====
The Health Information Technology for Economic and Clinical Health Act revised the Social Security Act to strengthen the enforcement and regulation of the HIPAA rules, by addressing privacy and security concerns of electronically stored health information.

=== Electronic Communications Privacy Act (ECPA) ===
As a result of growing technological change, Congress enacted the Electronic Communications Privacy Act (1986) to update the outdated Federal Wiretap Act. Included within the act was three Titles: Title 1 protects one's privacy of verbal, written, or electronic communication, Title 2, often called the Stored Communications Act, prevents electronic service people or companies from divulging the stored communication of its clientele to others, and Title 3 focuses on the use and regulation of dialed number recorders that associate a particular phone number to all outgoing and incoming calls. This protected privacy rights, because it prevented private companies from revealing private personal information of its clientele, and outlined that the illegal acquisition of private communication for the purposes of fraud or external knowledge about clientele could be a punishable offense.

=== Children's Online Privacy Protection Act (COPPA) ===
Children's Online Privacy Protection Act (“COPPA”), enacted in 1998, addresses the regulation of websites or other online services that collect, use, and disclose children's information. This act even includes financial institutions that knowingly collect child personal information through an online medium. The law even sets aside specific instructions the company must undertake to notify the subjects parents, in addition to seeking consent from the subject's parents to delete, modify, share, or collect the information. However some argue that with the rise of virtual education the act gives oversight to the role of administrators, teachers, and the school in protecting student privacy. Considering the adoption of in loco parentis within the court system, the author hopes that in the future more modifications will clarify educators’ roles and responsibilities as parental surrogates in protecting children's privacy in virtual education.

=== Gramm-Leach-Bliley Act ===
The Gramm-Leach-Bliley Act (1999) targeted information privacy practiced by financial institutions, as it required financial institutions to explain what, where, and how information will be collected and shared from the consumer to other entities. The act itself has four major provisions that secure consumer privacy; firstly, the company has to provide notices that inform customers of its privacy practices, the company must give power to the client when deciding whether to share personal information to third parties, the company must continue to develop policies that focus on data security, and lastly federal agencies such as the Federal Trade Commission will act as regulators and enforcers of the act. By providing a source of enforcement, and ensuring awareness of one's privacy, the Gramm-Leach-Bliley Act reaffirmed both the Fair Information Practices Principles (FIPP) and the protections underlined by the Privacy Act of 1974.

=== Regulation of Privacy Legislation ===
The regulation of Privacy legislation is outlined both within the Constitution and through independent autonomous agencies created and regulated by the legislative branch. These independent agencies interpret, regulate, investigate, and create reports that outline the efficiency of policy law implementation, in addition to issuing grievances to those that break the law and providing suggestions to the legislative branch on how to create effective policy for the future.

==== Federal Trade Commission ====
First introduced with the Federal Trade Commission Act (FTC Act), this agency primarily works with Congress to provide them relevant information during the law-making process.

=== Concerns and Controversies ===
Some argue that while there is significant focus in the media on "big business' and the practice of sharing financial data and personal private information, most bills that are proposed regarding privacy do not make it through the legislative process. Some argue that the speed of legislative action does not meet the rapid growth of technological change, as companies continue to struggle with the responsibility of consumer information and the ethical use of the collected data.

== Privacy and the Executive Branch ==
The purpose of the Executive branch is to implement, promote, and enforce laws passed by the United States Congress. In order to effectively administer and regulate privacy law, the President of the United States can sign bills, implement executive orders and push legislation through Congress. The executive branch is able to effectively make and alter privacy law by working with the other branches to gain public support and create new policy and precedence based on a predetermined political agenda. Different presidents adopt different stances on the interpretation and scope of privacy law and therefore support different legislation, policies, executive orders, and federal committees and agencies.

=== Donald Trump ===
During his presidency, Donald Trump has opted to pursue legislation that limits the scope of privacy rights for non-United States citizens and unlawful residents. In his executive order that alters the Privacy Act, Trump stated that privacy policies regarding personally identifiable information is excluded for personnel who are considered non US citizens or unlawful residents.

=== Barack Obama ===
During his presidency, Obama had two major privacy related platforms. One included the way by which the Federal Communications Commission (FCC) regulated Internet privacy laws, and the other was the backing of mass surveillance conducted by the NSA as a means of protecting the United States Security. Under his administration, Obama instructed the FCC to require organizations to tell consumers what information is being collected and how it is being used and shared.

=== George W. Bush ===
During his presidency two major initiatives that President Bush pushed through Congress was the creation of the Department of Homeland Security and the adoption of a federal E-Government program. After 9/11, two major concerns for policy makers became counter-terrorism and management of private information. As a result, Bush was able to broadly restructure the handling of information within the government by both enhancing access to information for the public and granting the government the ability to collect private information under the protection of the United States. This allowed President Bush to push legislation that involved deploying Federal Air Marshals on flights and nationalizing the system for secured access in airports through the Transportation Security Administration (TSA). The Texas legislature even considered enacting contradictory legislature that prevented these searches at the airport under the argument that it violated the Fourth Amendment, Administrative Procedure Act, Privacy Act, and Religious Freedom Restoration Act. However, because of the Supremacy Clause of the US Constitution, they were unable to control airport security. In addition to these statutes, President Bush also supported the USA Patriot Act (Uniting and Strengthening America by Providing Appropriate Tools Required to Intercept and Obstruct Terrorism Act of 2001), which infringed upon personal privacy law by allowing the government an expanded right to engage in electronic surveillance, disturbing commonly held surveillance rights. Some argued that the USA Patriot Act infringes upon the First and Fourth Amendment right, by monitoring private telephone conversations, "overhearing" private conversation, and discouraging political dissent.

=== William J. Clinton ===
President Bill Clinton, improved existing privacy rights by supporting alterations to the Freedom of Information Act (FOIA) by including amendments to the Electronic Freedom of Information Act (EFOIA). Intended to balance an individual's right to be "informed", and the "right to be let alone", the FOIA, initially signed into law by Lyndon B. Johnson, was modified by Bill Clinton to include electronic records and the timing of FOIA Requests to citizens. These modifications made private information more accessible to the public.

=== Concerns and Controversies ===
Although not directly performed during prescribed time in the presidential office, the use of personal private information for targeted politics on social media platforms has caused concerns regarding consumer privacy. In 2018, Facebook was accused of interfering in the 2016 election, potentially leading to events that altered the outcome.

== See also ==
- Privacy Act of 1974
- Children's Online Privacy Protection Act
- Gramm–Leach–Bliley Act
- Health Insurance Portability and Accountability Act
- Health Information Technology for Economic and Clinical Health Act
- Fair Credit Reporting Act
- Electronic Communications Privacy Act
- Information privacy law#HIPAA
- Fair and Accurate Credit Transactions Act
- Information privacy law
- Foreign Intelligence Surveillance Act of 1978 Amendments Act of 2008
