= Frozen 2: Dangerous Secrets =

2020 novel by Mari Mancusi

- First edition
- Author: Mari Mancusi
- Audio read by: Evan Rachel Wood and Alfred Molina
- Illustrator: Grace Lee
- Language: English
- Genre: Young adult, fantasy
- Publisher: Disney Press
- Publication date: November 3, 2020
- Publication place: United States
- Pages: 352
- ISBN: 978-1-368-06361-6

Frozen 2: Dangerous Secrets: The Story of Iduna and Agnarr is a young adult fantasy novel written by Mari Mancusi with illustrations by Grace Lee. Part of the Frozen franchise, the novel was published by Disney Press on November 3, 2020, and tells the story of Elsa and Anna's parents Queen Iduna and King Agnarr.

== Synopsis ==
The novel tells the backstory of Elsa and Anna's parents Queen Iduna and King Agnarr. It recounts Iduna's childhood friendship with Agnarr, the crown prince of Arendelle. Their friendship eventually grows into romance, all the while Iduna hides the fact that she is a Northuldra, the enemy of Arendelle.

== Background ==
Frozen 2: Dangerous Secrets was written by author Mari Mancusi, a self-professed fan of the Frozen franchise. Mancusi's early research for the novel included re-watching the Walt Disney Animation Studios film Frozen (2013), as well as reading through the script of its sequel Frozen 2 (2019), which had not been released at the time. After Frozen 2 was released, Mancusi read through the reviews for the film, picking out the questions reviewers had about Iduna and Agnarr's backstory, which she then worked with filmmakers Jennifer Lee and Chris Buck to answer in the novel. Mancusi said she included "easter eggs" in the novel so as to give fans of the films "[a] sense that all of this was connected in seamless world."

The book is written in the first-person and alternates between Iduna and Agnarr's points of view, which the author felt allowed readers to better understand the characters.

== Release ==
In the months leading up to its publication, excerpts from the novel were released. Following the novel's publication, Mancusi released a tie-in short story titled "A Perfect Night".

Frozen 2: Dangerous Secrets was released by Disney Press on November 3, 2020. The novel was also released in audiobook format with narration by Evan Rachel Wood and Alfred Molina, who had voiced the characters of Iduna and Agnarr respectively in Frozen 2.

== Critical reception ==
Both Kirkus Reviews and the School Library Journal's India Winslow agreed that Frozen 2: Dangerous Secrets would appeal to fans of romance novels and the Frozen franchise. Kirkus Reviews concluded: "Descriptive writing, two interesting and independent leads, and a warm cast of background characters enhance the story." A reviewer for Nerds and Beyond gave the novel a positive review, writing that Mancusi "expertly" fleshes out the characters and world of the franchise.

The novel was nominated for the Young Adult Library Services Association's 2021 Teens' Top Ten.
