= Volume-control model =

Analytical framework

The volume-control model or volume and control model is an analytical framework to describe the conditions that allow the transition of information into power. It requires controlling and regulating the connections between a large volume of information and people. This could be achieved by maintaining a balance between popular and personal information.

While popular information is relevant to a large audience, personal information is relevant to specific people. Ultimately, this is often practiced by network customization, which is tailoring information to specific groups based on common traits.

== Basic principles ==
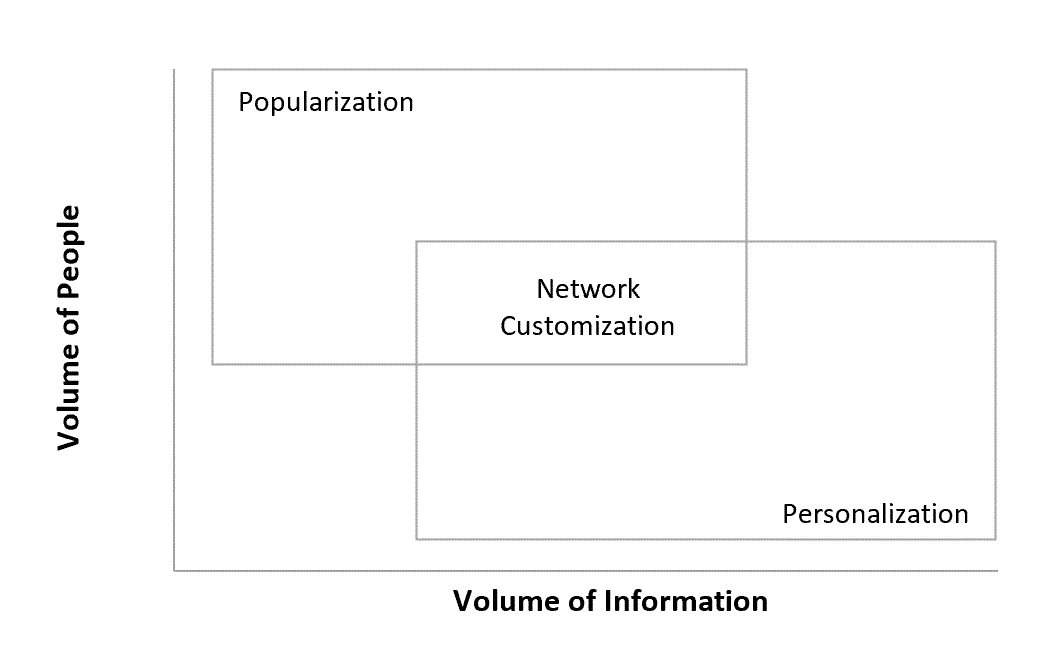
Volume-Control Model

The volume-control model is a part of the broader idea of the power-knowledge nexus. Lash referred to the volume of information as an additive power, which is not only related to the amount of information people are exposed to, but also the number of links they get from others.

Volume is therefore associated with both the amount of information and the number of people who produce and receive it.

In this model control refers to the ability to effectively connect between the volume of information and the volume of people. Following the Popular–Personal Theory the first mechanism of control, popularization, is about focusing on the most popular information and offering it to a large number of people.

Popularization is a common strategy of global corporations such as Google (with its PageRank that prioritizes websites with many incoming links) and Netflix (with its algorithm to show the most viewed series and films), which enable them to exert greater control over their users.

The second mechanism of control is information personalization. This is often achieved by tailoring information to the specific needs of each unique user, or groups of users, based on their demographic profile and tastes, their search history and website visits, and the information they produce, including web activity and mouse movement.

== Applications ==
According to Scott Galloway, the Big Four tech companies (Google, Meta, Amazon and Apple) have translated information to economic power by securing their exclusive access to a great volume of information and people. Their strategy was offering both popular and customized information to a growing number of users.

This model is being used to explain the bias of Google Images search, in which the vast majority of results to the query "beauty" present mainly white young females. While the unique search query "beauty" enables personalization of images, all of them are ultimately homogeneous and similar to each other.

Taken from beauty industry company websites and fashion magazines, they represent the mainstream perception of beauty as a product. The trade-off between popularization and personalization techniques in the practice of large corporations such Netflix or Meta (with its Instagram platform) can similarly explain the seemingly different but largely homogeneous content they produce.

Another study that applied the Volume-Control Model examined user engagement on Twitter. It measured the personalization strategies using singular pronouns such as "I", "you", "he" and "she", compared to popularization strategies using plural pronouns such as "we" and "they". It was found that retweets are more likely to use popularization strategies as users address larger audiences with the plural pronoun "we". Replies, on the other hand, are more likely to use personalization strategies as users address individuals using singular pronouns.
