= Popular–personal theory =

The popular–personal theory of power was developed to explain how people use information to gain power. In the book Information and Power, Segev argues that people gain power as they use information to craft popular and personal stories. Popular stories such as capitalism, socialism, democracy, nationalism, or religion facilitate cooperation among people, and are often shaped to accommodate the needs of the few people and groups in power. Personal stories, on the other hand, accommodate individual needs and define the unique role of each person within those popular stories. Powerful and stable societies are able to maintain popular and personal stories in a certain balance. Once this balance is disturbed, there is a growing unrest among individuals and groups, which could lead to social transformations and modifications of the stories to support new social structures.

Popular and personal stories are mechanisms to control the flow of information that constantly compete but also complete each other. For example, in the popular story of capitalism, money and wealth are the main motivation for people to cooperate. People develop common stories and establish companies and organizations to gain economic power. Within those companies, people further develop personal stories to cooperate and compete, and to define their unique role in the popular story of capitalism. They can become managers, product developers, marketers, or customers. Through the products that people consume they further define their personal stories.

While capitalism has become one of the most popular stories today and a major means to gain power, it has also led to growing economic inequalities, monopolies of tech companies, global exploitation of resources in poorer countries, commercialization of media and politics, decline of social capital, growing information surveillance and the loss of privacy. More people around the world feel unease with the unprecedented dominance of global corporations. They become powerless and are unable to relate and express their personal stories and needs. The popular-personal theory helps to understand the crisis of capitalism today and explore new alternative stories to bring back the balance and accommodate the needs of more people.
