= Stone v. Powell =

Stone v. Powell; Wolff v. Rice
- Supreme Court of the United States

Argued February 24, 1976 Decided July 6, 1976
- Full case name: Stone, Warden, v. Powell; Wolff, Warden, v. Rice
- Docket no.: 74-1055
- Citations: 428 U.S. 465 (more) 96 S.Ct. 3037, 49 L.Ed.2d 1067
- Argument: Oral argument

Case history
- Prior: For Stone v. Powell: convicted (Superior Court of San Bernardino County); affirmed (California Court of Appeal, 1969); habeas corpus petition denied (California Supreme Court); habeas corpus petition denied (Northern District of California); reversed, 507 F.2d 93 (9th Cir. 1974), certiorari granted, 422 U. S. 1055 (1975) For Wolff v. Rice: convicted, (District Court of Douglas County); affirmed, 199 N.W.2d 480 (Neb. 1972); habeas corpus petition granted, 388 F.Supp. 185 (D. Neb. 1974); affirmed, 513 F.2d 1280 (8th Cir. 1975); certiorari granted, 422 U. S. 1055 (1975)

Holding
- If a state prisoner's claim as to a violation of the Fourth Amendment exclusionary rule has already been given a full and fair hearing by state courts, it may not be heard by federal courts in a habeas corpus petition.

Court membership
- Chief Justice Warren E. Burger Associate Justices William J. Brennan Jr. · Potter Stewart; Byron White · Thurgood Marshall; Harry Blackmun · Lewis F. Powell Jr. William Rehnquist · John P. Stevens

Case opinions
- Majority: Powell, joined by Stewart, Blackmun, Rehnquist, and Stevens
- Concurrence: Burger
- Dissent: Brennan, joined by Marshall
- Dissent: White

Laws applied
- U.S. Const. amend. IV, habeas corpus

Stone v. Powell, 428 U.S. 465 (1976), was a decision of the Supreme Court of the United States that limited which claims of Fourth Amendment violations could be made by state prisoners in habeas corpus petitions in federal courts. Specifically, a claim that the exclusionary rule had been broken would be barred if state courts had already given it a full and fair hearing. The decision combined two cases that were argued before the Supreme Court on the same day with similar issues, one filed by Lloyd Powell (convicted of murder in California) and the other, titled Wolff v. Rice, filed by David Rice (convicted of murder in Nebraska).

== Procedural history of Stone v. Powell ==
=== Background ===
On the night of February 16, 1968, Lloyd Powell and three friends were at a liquor store in San Bernardino, California, when the store manager spotted Powell stealing a bottle of wine, and a gunfight broke out. During the fight, Powell shot and killed the manager's wife (Mary Parsons). Around 10 AM the following morning, Powell was arrested in Henderson, Nevada for violating the local vagrancy ordinance. The arresting officer found a revolver in his jacket that turned out to be the murder weapon, and he was extradited back to California.

=== Trial, appeal, and habeas corpus petition ===
Powell was tried for second-degree murder. He tried to prevent the revolver from being used as evidence, on the grounds that the vagrancy ordinance was unconstitutionally vague, and therefore his arrest and the officer's search were also unconstitutional, but the trial court found no problem with the ordinance. Evidence against Powell also included testimony from his friends and the store manager, and Powell was convicted.

He appealed to the California Court of Appeal over the use of the revolver as evidence, but his conviction was affirmed. The Court of Appeal did not make a ruling on the constitutionality of the vagrancy ordinance; instead, it held that, even if it were an error for the trial court to allow the revolver as evidence, the strength of the other evidence made it a "harmless error" under the standards of Chapman v. California. Powell then filed a habeas corpus petition with the California Supreme Court, which was denied.

Next, Powell filed a habeas corpus petition in the federal Northern District of California, raising the same issue, but the district court agreed with the California Court of Appeal. On appeal in 1974, however, the Ninth Circuit Court of Appeals reversed, ruling that the error was not harmless, and that the vagrancy ordinance was unconstitutionally vague, like the one invalidated in the 1972 Supreme Court case Papachristou v. City of Jacksonville. The prison warden, W.T. Stone, appealed to the Supreme Court on behalf of the state of California, and certiorari was granted.

== Procedural history of Wolff v. Rice ==
=== Background ===
In the early hours of August 17, 1970, police in Omaha, Nebraska received a report of a woman screaming for help. A suitcase was seen lying in the doorway at the reported location, and when an officer (Larry Minard, Sr.) approached, it exploded, killing him instantly and injuring other offices nearby. The following investigation centered on Duane Peak, a 15-year-old member of the National Committee to Combat Fascism (NCCF). 27-year-old David Rice was one of the known members of NCCF that police investigated as part of their search for Peak. The police went to Rice's home the night of August 22 to look for Peak. When no one answered the door, some officers stayed to watch the premises, while other obtained a search warrant. Once they had the warrant, the police entered and found a variety of explosive equipment. Peak and Rice would be arrested within the following few days. Peak admitted being the one to plant the bomb, and would testify that the masterminds had been Rice and another NCCF member, Edward Poindexter.

=== Trial, appeal, and habeas corpus petition ===
Rice and Poindexter were jointly tried for first-degree murder in the Douglas County district court. Among its evidence, the prosecution introduced evidence of the explosives it had found at Rice's house, as well as chemical traces of explosives found on the clothing Rice was wearing when he was arrested. Rice tried to exclude this evidence, arguing the warrant had been invalid, but the judge disagreed. Rice and Poindexter were convicted and sentenced to life imprisonment.

Rice and Poindexter appealed to the Nebraska Supreme Court, arguing that the trial court had made a variety of errors, including its decision not to exclude evidence from the search of Rice's house. The Court rejected all of their arguments. In particular, the Court found that the search warrant had been based on an adequate affidavit. It noted that "[t]he confused and confusing state of the law of search and seizure is widely recognized", and that officers had been working 18-hour days following the bombing, and ultimately judged that the hearsay evidence used (e.g. that Rice was known to be a NCCF member, that he was known to have explosives in his house) was enough support to satisfy the Fourth Amendment.

Rice then filed a habeas corpus petition in the federal District Court of Nebraska, focusing on the argument that the search warrant for his house had been invalid, and evidence stemming from it should have been excluded by the trial court. The judge (Warren Urbom) disagreed with the Nebraska Supreme Court's ruling on the warrant, observing that "[i]n part the Supreme Court of Nebraska rested its finding of validity in the search warrant upon information which the police officers had but which was not revealed to the magistrate. In my opinion, such consideration is not acceptable under federal constitutional standards." Judge Urbom then held an evidentiary hearing to assess other grounds for the search and seizure, and ultimately ruled that there were no other justifications that satisfied the Fourth Amendment. As a result, the habeas corpus petition was granted, and was affirmed on appeal to the Eighth Circuit Court of Appeals. The decision was then appealed to the U.S. Supreme Court.

== Decision of the Supreme Court ==
=== Majority opinion ===
In a 6–3 decision, the U.S. Supreme Court reversed the rulings of the Eighth and Ninth Circuits. Justice Lewis Powell (not to be confused with Lloyd Powell, one of the plaintiffs), writing for the majority, started by reviewing the history of habeas corpus in U.S. federal courts, particularly observing that its scope had varied considerably over the years. For example, even after authority was granted in 1867 for federal courts to hear petitions from state prisoners, it was not until 1915 (in Frank v. Mangum) that issues other than the jurisdiction of the sentencing court could be considered. The range of substantive issues allowing in habeas corpus proceedings expanded over the years through various Supreme Court decisions, including Kaufman v. United States in 1969, which allowed claims under the Fourth Amendment exclusionary rule.

In an influential article Henry Friendly had noted that "the one thing almost never suggested on collateral attack is that the prisoner was innocent of the crime". The Court applied Friendly's reasoning to deny federal habeas review to exclusionary rule claims because the claim of constitutional error was not related to the factual guilt or innocence of the defendant.

The majority reviewed the history of the exclusionary rule established in early 20th-century cases such as Weeks v. United States (1914) and Gouled v. United States, (1921) and applied to state courts in Mapp v. Ohio (1961). The exclusionary rule is not a right provided by the Constitution itself, it is a judicially-created prophylactic rule to deter violations of the Fourth Amendment right "to be secure...against unreasonable searches and seizures". In general, the majority said, the benefits of the exclusionary rule had to weighed against its tendency to exclude "highly probative evidence."

The costs of applying the exclusionary rule even at trial and on direct review are well known: the focus of the trial, and the attention of the participants therein, are diverted from the ultimate question of guilt or innocence that should be the central concern in a criminal proceeding. Moreover, the physical evidence sought to be excluded is typically reliable and often the most probative information bearing on the guilt or innocence of the defendant. As Mr. Justice Black emphasized in his dissent in Kaufman:

"A claim of illegal search and seizure under the Fourth Amendment is crucially different from many other constitutional rights; ordinarily the evidence seized can in no way have been rendered untrustworthy by the means of its seizure and indeed often this evidence alone establishes beyond virtually any shadow of a doubt that the defendant is guilty."

Application of the rule thus deflects the truthfinding process and often frees the guilty. The disparity in particular cases between the error committed by the police officer and the windfall afforded a guilty defendant by application of the rule is contrary to the idea of proportionality that is essential to the concept of justice. Thus, although the rule is thought to deter unlawful police activity in part through the nurturing of respect for Fourth Amendment values, if applied indiscriminately it may well have the opposite effect of generating disrespect for the law and administration of justice.

— Stone v. Powell, 428 U.S. at 490 (Justice Powell, writing for the majority)

Accordingly, the Court ruled that federal courts could not review state court decisions to not exclude evidence obtained in violation of the Fourth Amendment via habeas corpus petitions.

=== Burger's concurrence ===
Justice Burger concurred with the majority, but wanted the ruling to go much further. He argued in favor of abolishing the exclusionary rule entirely, calling it a "Draconian, discredited device", and asserting that "no empirical study has been able to demonstrate that the rule does in fact have any deterrent effect" against unconstitutional police work.

=== Brennan's dissent ===
Justice Brennan, joined by Justice Marshall, wrote a dissenting opinion—as long as the majority's (35 pages)—that accused the majority of really basing their decision on antagonism toward the exclusionary rule, rather than the legal issues actually involved in the case. Rather, he wrote, the case at hand depended on whether federal rights could be vindicated in federal courts pursuant to a statute written by the U.S. Congress (28 U.S.C. § 2254, governing habeas corpus petitions). Brennan said it made no sense to separate the exclusionary rule from other aspects of the Fourth Amendment, and he also criticized the majority for characterizing habeas corpus laws only as judge-made laws, ignoring the fact that they had been given statutory form by Congress:

Under Mapp, as a matter of federal constitutional law, a state court must exclude evidence from the trial of an individual whose Fourth and Fourteenth Amendment rights were violated by a search or seizure that directly or indirectly resulted in the acquisition of that evidence. As United States v. Calandra reaffirmed, "evidence obtained in violation of the Fourth Amendment cannot be used in a criminal proceeding against the victim of the illegal search and seizure." When a state court admits such evidence, it has committed a constitutional error...

— Stone v. Powell, 428 U.S. at 509, (Justice Brennan, dissenting)

As long as the exclusionary rule remained part of the Supreme Court's interpretation of the Fourth Amendment, he argued, the Court had no authority to exclude it from consideration in habeas corpus proceedings.

=== White' dissent ===
Justice White dissented for much the same reasons as Brennan and Marshall. White particularly complained that cases would be treated differently if they were heard on direct appeal rather than on habeas corpus petitions. However, he also expressed sympathy with the view of the majority (and Burger's concurrence) that the exclusionary rule was too often leading to guilty criminals going free, and there was too much second-guessing of police officers who were conducting searches and seizures in good faith.
