= Kaufman v. United States =

- Supreme Court of the United States

Argued November 19, 1968 Decided March 24, 1969
- Full case name: Harold Kaufman, Petitioner, v. United States
- Citations: 394 U.S. 217 (more) 89 S. Ct. 1068, 22 L.Ed.2d 227
- Argument: Oral argument

Case history
- Prior: 350 F.2d 408 (CA8 1965)

Holding
- A claim of unconstitutional search and seizure is cognizable in a proceeding under 28 U.S.C. § 2255.

Court membership
- Chief Justice Earl Warren Associate Justices Hugo Black · William O. Douglas; John M. Harlan II · William J. Brennan Jr. Potter Stewart · Byron White; Abe Fortas · Thurgood Marshall

Case opinions
- Majority: Brennan, joined by Warren, Douglas, White, Fortas
- Dissent: Black
- Dissent: Harlan, joined by Stewart
- Marshall took no part in the consideration or decision of the case.

Kaufman v. United States, 394 U.S. 217 (1969), was a United States Supreme Court case decided in 1969. In a majority opinion authored by Justice William J. Brennan, Jr., the Court held that criminal defendants could bring claims that evidence against them was obtained in violation of the Fourth Amendment to the United States Constitution in a collateral attack under the federal habeas corpus statute. In doing so, the Court overruled the contrary decision by the United States Court of Appeals for the Eighth Circuit, which had held that Kaufman could not raise his Fourth Amendment claim in a collateral attack. The Supreme Court's decision in Kaufman also ran counter to most other previous decisions by federal appeals courts, most of which had held that claims of unreasonable searches and seizures could only be raised on direct appeal, rather than in collateral proceedings.

The decision in Kaufman also applied the "deliberate bypass" standard the Supreme Court had outlined in its 1963 decision in Fay v. Noia, in which the Court had held that state prisoners were permitted to raise claims in federal habeas proceedings so long as they did not "deliberately bypass" the procedures for raising such claims in state court. Kaufman extended this logic to federal prisoners, holding that federal courts could only deny habeas relief to such prisoners if they had deliberately forfeited their claim in previous proceedings before raising it in federal habeas court. Kaufman has since been described as "the last important case of the 1960s to defend a liberal interpretation of habeas corpus on the grounds of Fay". In part on the basis of Justice Hugo Black's dissent in Kaufman, the Supreme Court went on to significantly limit the availability of habeas corpus relief in the 1976 case Stone v. Powell.
