= Mari Mancusi =

American writer

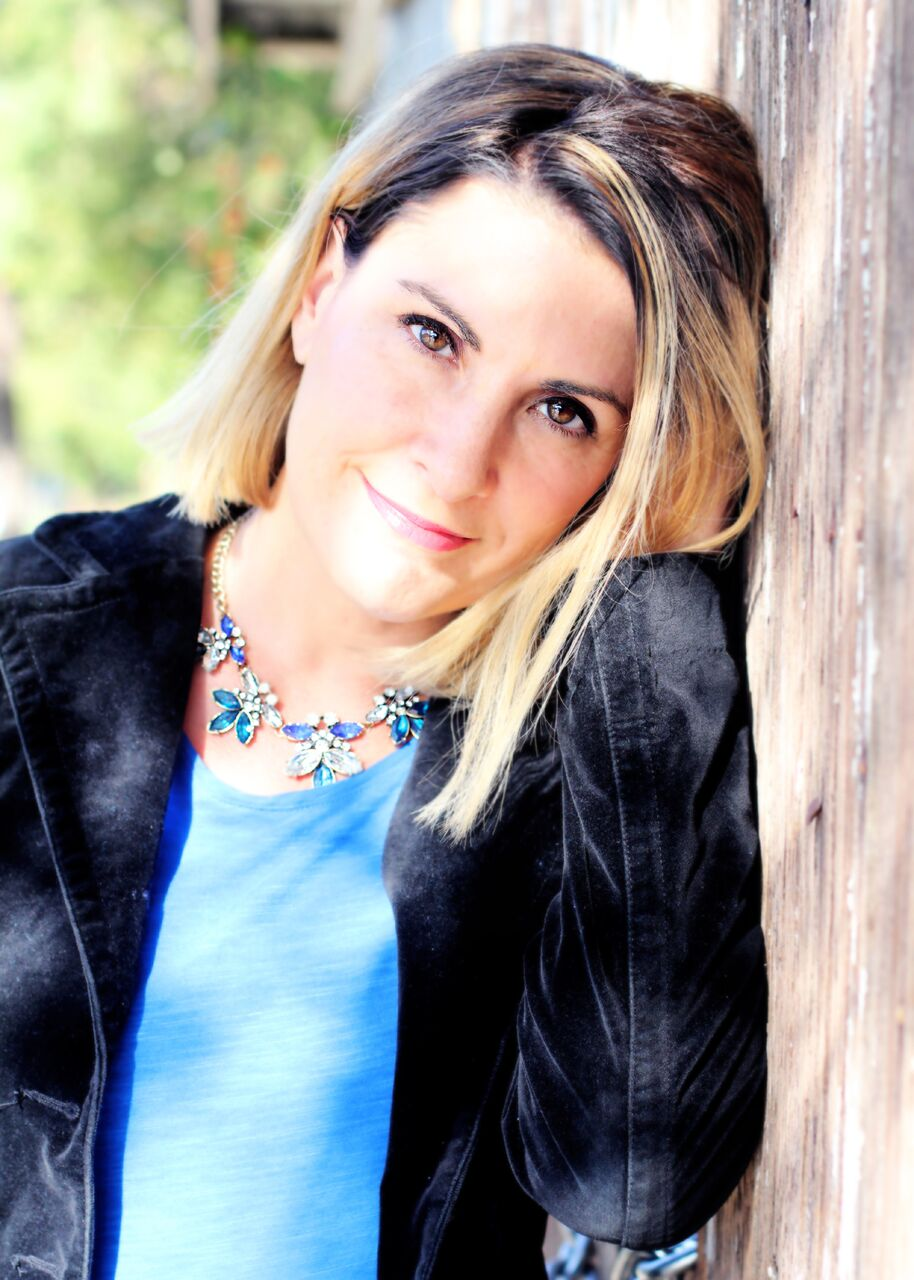
- Writing career
- Genres: Young Adult, Young Adult, Romance

Mari Mancusi, sometimes credited as Marianne Mancusi, is an American author of middle grade young adult and new adult novels and former Emmy Award winning television news producer.

== Bibliography ==
=== Blood Coven Vampires Series ===
1. Boys That Bite (2006)
2. Stake That (2006)
3. Girls That Growl (2007)
4. Bad Blood (2009)
5. Night School (2010)
6. Blood Ties (2011)
7. Soul Bound (2012)
8. Blood Forever (2012)
9. Blood Coven Vampires Volume One (2011)
10. ‘’Once Upon a Vampire’’ (2017)

=== Scorched series ===
1. Scorched (2013)
2. Shattered (2014)
3. Smoked (2015)

=== Frozen series ===
- Frozen 2: Dangerous Secrets (2020)
- Frozen: Polar Nights (2022)

=== Middle Grade novels ===
1. "Golden Girl" (2015)
2. "Princesses, Inc" (2017)
3. "The Camelot Code: The Once and Future Geek” (2018)
4. "The Camelot Code: Geeks and the Holy Grail" (2019)
5. ”Dragon Ops” (2020)
6. "Dragon Ops 2" (2021)

=== Standalone novels ===
- A Connecticut Fashionista in King Arthur's Court (2005)
- Sk8er Boy (2005)
- What, No Roses? (2006)
- A Hoboken Hipster in Sherwood Forest (2007)
- Moongazer (2007) (Reissued in 2012 as Alternity)
- Razor Girl (2008) (Reissued in 2012 as Tomorrow Land)
- News Blues (2008) (Reissued in 2012 as Love at 11)
- Gamer Girl (2008)
- These Boots Were Made for Stomping (Anthology, 2008) (Reissued story "Karma Kitty Goes to Comic Con" in 2011)
- My Zombie Valentine (Anthology, 2010) (Reissued story "Zombiewood Confidential" in 2011)

== Awards ==
- 2006 Most Innovative Historical Romance Award for What, No Roses?, RT Book Reviews
- 2009 Quick Picks for Reluctant Young Adult Readers for Gamer Girl, YALSA
- 2012 Popular Paperbacks for Young Adults for Gamer Girl, YALSA
