= Rakas v. Illinois =

- Supreme Court of the United States

Argued October 3, 1978 Decided December 5, 1978
- Full case name: People v. Rakas, 46 Ill. App. 3d 569, 4 Ill. Dec. 877, 360 N.E.2d 1252 (App. 3d Dist. 1977), Court Opinion Rakas et al. v. Illinois
- Citations: 439 U.S. 128 (more) 99 S. Ct. 421; 58 L. Ed. 2d 387

Case history
- Prior: People v. Rakas, 46 Ill. App. 3d 569, 4 Ill. Dec. 877, 360 N.E.2d 1252 (App. 3d Dist. 1977)

Holding
- Expectation of privacy in an area subject to search or seizure is required to challenge the legality of the 4th amendment invasion.

Court membership
- Chief Justice Warren E. Burger Associate Justices William J. Brennan Jr. · Potter Stewart; Byron White · Thurgood Marshall; Harry Blackmun · Lewis F. Powell Jr. William Rehnquist · John P. Stevens

Case opinions
- Majority: Rehnquist, joined by Burger, Stewart, Blackmun, Powell
- Concurrence: Powell, joined by Burger
- Dissent: White, joined by Brennan, Marshall, Stevens

Rakas v. Illinois, 439 U.S. 128, was a United States Supreme Court case decided in 1978. The case addressed the theoretical boundaries of personal standing within the context of search and seizure under the Fourth Amendment to the United States Constitution. In a 5–4 decision, the Court held that to claim the protection of the Fourth Amendment, a defendant must demonstrate that they have a reasonable expectation of privacy in the place or belonging that is subjected to a search.

== Factual background ==
On February 4, 1975, law enforcement officials in Kankakee County, Illinois, were alerted via radio to a robbery that had taken place several hours earlier that day. The report provided detailed descriptions of the two male assailants, along with the license plate number, year, make, model, and color of their vehicle. A police officer on duty observed a vehicle occupied by Rakas and his companions and pursued it, initially suspecting it to be the getaway car described in the report. The officer quickly discerned that the vehicle was of a different color and bore a different license plate number; nevertheless, he maintained his pursuit. Upon the vehicle's arrival at a lounge, where its occupants proceeded indoors, the officer dispatched a description of the suspects. Another officer on dispatch informed the trailing officer that one of the descriptions corresponded with that of one of the male assailants in the robbery. The suspects were subsequently back in their vehicle and traveling on the highway when the officer and his requested backup stopped them.

The officers, despite recognizing that the vehicle was evidently not the one they were seeking, instructed the occupants of the car (petitioners Rakas and King, plus two young women) to exit the vehicle at gunpoint. The police conducted a comprehensive search of the car while holding the occupants outside. While searching the vehicle, the officers found a locked glove compartment containing a box of rifle shells, as well as a sawed-off rifle located beneath the front passenger seat. Upon finding the rifle and the ammunition, the officers transported the petitioners to the station and placed them under arrest.

== Procedural history ==
=== Trial court decision ===
Before trial, the petitioners filed a motion to suppress the rifle and the shells, claiming that the vehicle was stopped and searched illegally and without probable cause. They acknowledged that they were not the vehicle's owners and were merely passengers—the owner had been driving it at the time of the search. Because of this, the Circuit Court of Kankakee County rejected the motion to suppress the evidence. The court, in light of this holding, did not determine whether there was probable cause for the search and seizure.

=== Appellate Court ruling ===
The Appellate Court of Illinois, 3rd Judicial District, on appeal following the petitioners' conviction, upheld the trial court's rejection of the suppression motion. The court determined that a mere passenger in a vehicle, lacking any proprietary or similar interest in the automobile, does not possess the standing necessary to contest the legality of the vehicle's search. In other words, the court held that the petitioners could not legally bring a lawsuit to challenge the alleged unlawful search, as they themselves were not injured by what had occurred. In the intermediate appellate court, the opinion stated:

We believe that defendants failed to establish any prejudice to their own constitutional rights because they were not persons aggrieved by the unlawful search and seizure ... They wrongly seek to establish prejudice only through the use of evidence gathered as a consequence of a search and seizure directed at someone else and fail to prove an invasion of their own privacy.

Following the denial of leave to appeal by the Illinois Supreme Court, Rakas and King submitted a petition for writ of certiorari, which was subsequently granted by the United States Supreme Court.

== Opinion of the Court ==
=== Arguments ===
Rakas placed extensive emphasis on prior Court precedent, especially Jones v. United States, 362 U.S. 257 (1960). In Jones, the Court conducted a comprehensive analysis of the standing doctrine for the first time. Cecil Jones possessed a key to his friend's apartment, where he stored some clothing, although he resided in a different location. He was authorized to use the apartment, but he had spent the night there only on one occasion. The police carried out a search warrant at the location and discovered drugs, which were presented as evidence during the trial, leading to Jones's conviction. He claimed to have no involvement with the drugs. In Jones, the Court held that the defendant had standing to challenge a search because he was "legitimately on the premises" when the search occurred. Initially, the Court determined that Jones was not required to claim possession of the drugs to establish standing, as the government could not contend that he had insufficient possession for standing while simultaneously asserting his guilt regarding the offense. Furthermore, the Court recognized Jones as a "person aggrieved" by the search due to his vested interest in the property.

Rakas initially argued that the Court ought to expand the Jones ruling to allow any criminal defendant against whom a search was "directed" to have standing to challenge the search's legality. This is essentially the "target" theory of standing, where standing would be legitimized when an investigation is carried out on one individual to gather evidence on another individual.

The government contended that the defendants, as mere passengers who neither owned the vehicle nor the rifle and ammunition discovered within it, lacked a reasonable expectation of privacy concerning those parts of the car. They maintained that being a passenger alone did not grant them the authority to challenge the search.

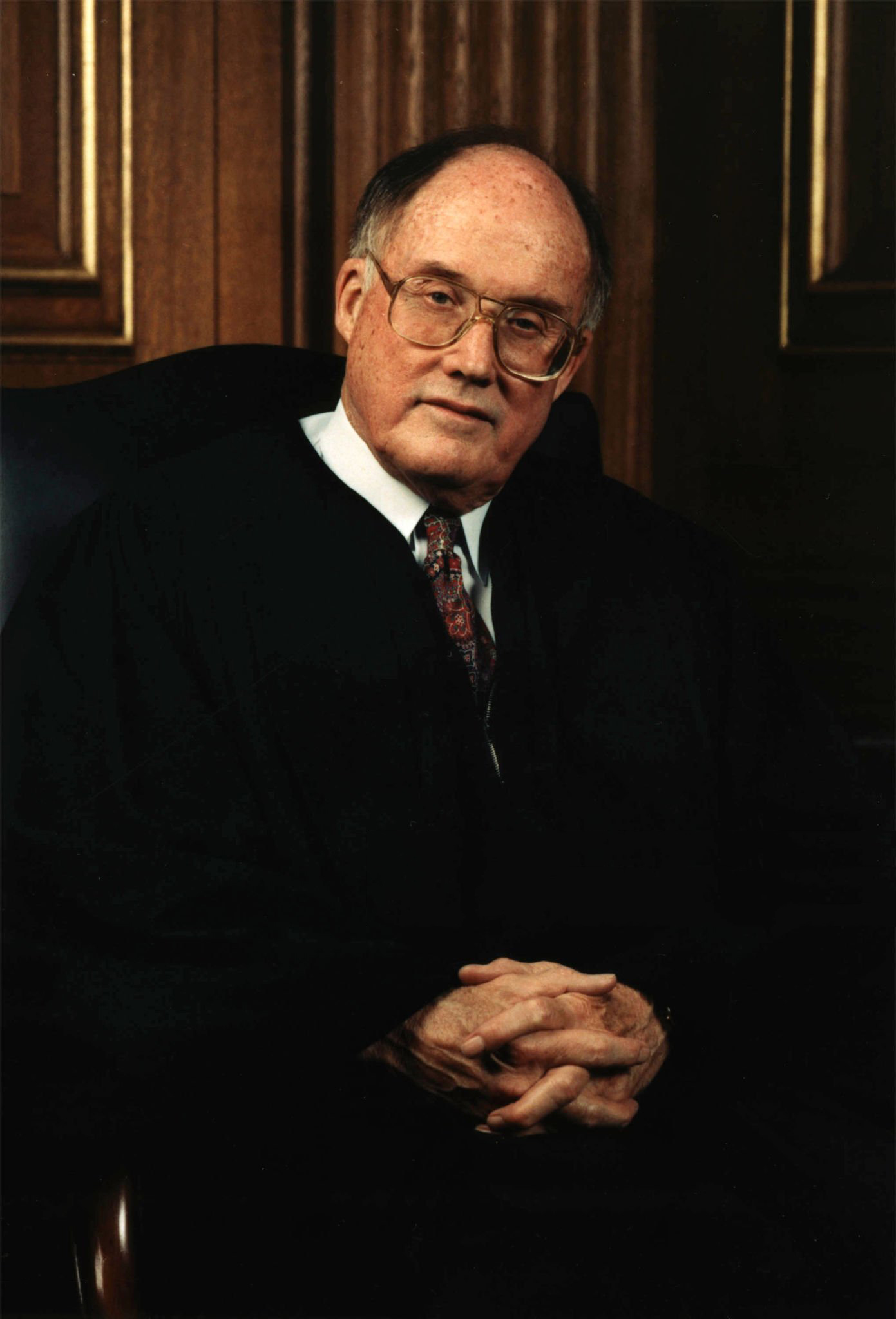
Justice William Rehnquist, author of the majority opinion.

=== Court's rejection of target theory of standing ===
In arriving at its decision on standing, the Rakas court distinguished its reasoning from the standing analysis employed in Jones. Writing for the majority opinion, Justice William Rehnquist reiterated that "Fourth Amendment rights are personal rights which, similar to certain other constitutional rights, cannot be asserted vicariously." A challenge to a search and seizure can be made only by an individual who has been harmed by it, and such harm is determined solely by a breach of that individual's reasonable expectation of privacy, rather than simply by the presentation of evidence that may be used against them. The assertion in dictum from Jones, which appeared to grant target standing to "one against whom the search was directed", was categorically dismissed. The Court noted that implementing the target standing rule would present significant administrative challenges, particularly in assessing the degree to which the individual in question qualified as a target. Furthermore, the Court concluded that enduring these challenges would result in only a minimal enhancement of protections under the Fourth Amendment.

The Court determined that it was more appropriate to evaluate standing within the context of the substantive law of the Fourth Amendment, rather than treating it as an independent issue. This decision was influenced by the personal nature of the rights safeguarded by the Fourth Amendment and the overarching constitutional requirement of demonstrating "injury in fact". By "injury in fact", the plaintiff needs to have suffered an injury of a legally protectable interest which is (a) concrete and particularized, and (b) actual and imminent.

In addressing the reasonable expectation of privacy doctrine, the Court rejected Jones's "legitimately on the premises" test, deeming it to be "too broad a gauge for assessment of Fourth Amendment rights" when considered alongside the standards of reasonable expectation of privacy. An individual who is "legitimately present on the premises" but did not have an expectation of privacy would possess standing under the Jones precedent. Additionally, the statement regarding Jones being "legitimately on the premises" was not aligned with expectation analysis; based on expectation analysis, the outcome for Jones would not have varied, as he indeed possessed a reasonable expectation of privacy in the location that was searched.

The Court determined, by applying expectation analysis to the relevant facts, that Rakas and King lacked standing, as they did not claim either a proprietary or a possessory interest in the seized property. The simple presence of individuals in the vehicle during the search did not serve as a conclusive factor. They did not claim or attempt to demonstrate that they had a reasonable expectation of privacy within the vehicle.

== Dissent ==
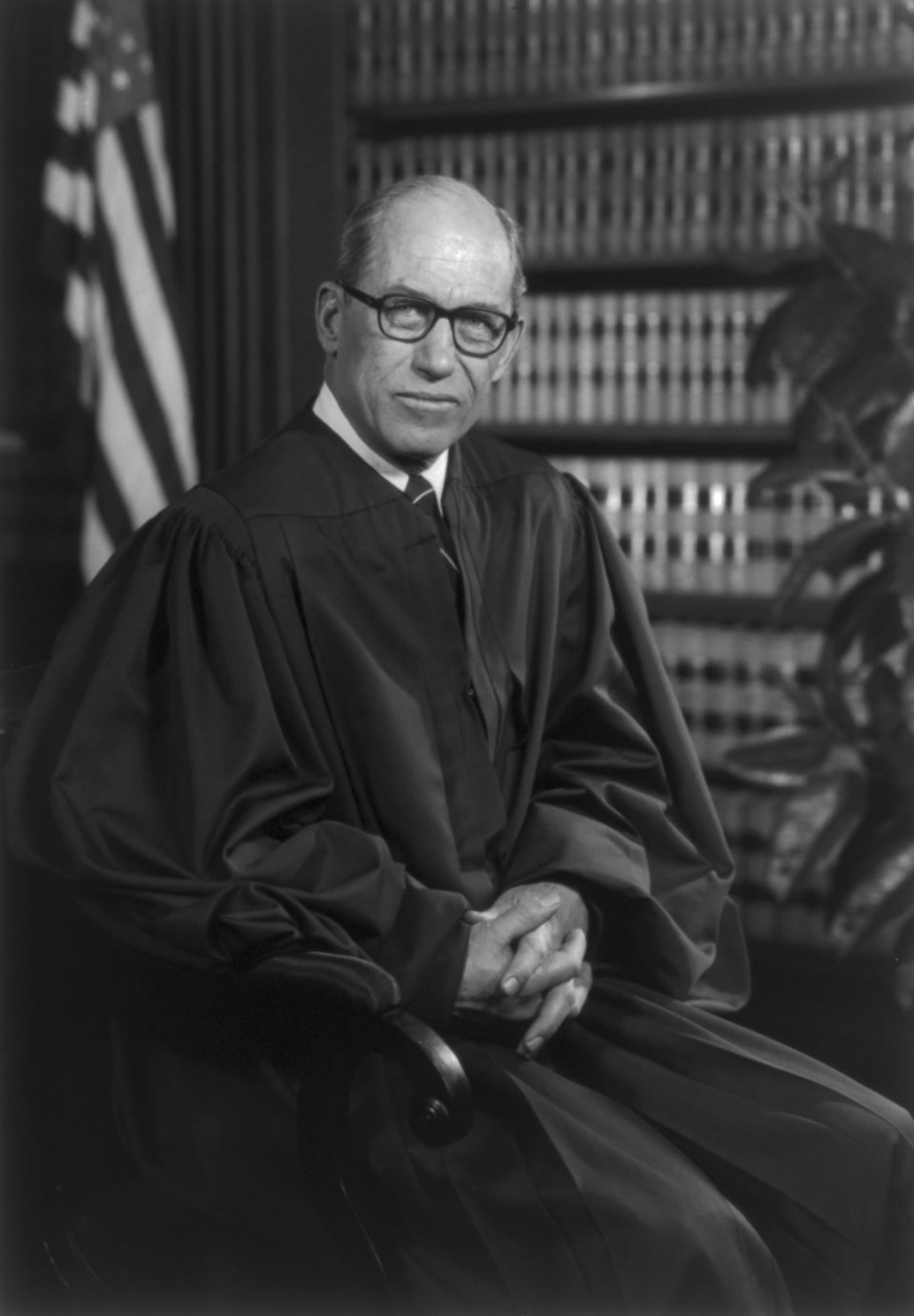
Justice Byron White, author of the dissenting opinion.

While agreeing with the majority that the reasonable expectation of privacy analysis should govern standing cases under the Fourth Amendment, the dissent disagreed with the majority's determination that the petitioners had no reasonable expectation of privacy within the vehicle. Specifically, Justice Byron White, writing for the minority, worried about the implications of the majority's holding, writing: "Insofar as passengers are concerned, the Court's opinion today declares an 'open season' on automobiles." Justice White found that the Court's holding stood in direct contrast to prior precedent and that it would remain untenable in various real-world situations that ordinary people encounter daily. Additionally, Justice White opined that the majority's holding would severely undercut the rationale for the exclusionary rule, which is the deterrence of bad faith actions by government actors. The ruling would encourage law enforcement to conduct evidently unjustifiable searches whenever a vehicle had multiple passengers. If any evidence were discovered, only the vehicle owner or the item's owner would have the right to request its suppression, and the evidence was likely to be used against the other passengers.

== Responses and analysis ==
As the most recent seminal case on Fourth Amendment standing doctrine, Rakas has drawn mixed criticism from the legal academy. Some commentators have argued that merging the concept of "standing" with the more substantive inquiry into whether one has a personal expectation of privacy in the thing or area searched is a more expeditious way to resolve pressing Fourth Amendment issues. Instead of placing standing as a separate inquiry, having courts apply the reasonable expectation of privacy doctrine to the concept streamlines the issue and precludes the courts from a pointless separate inquiry. Other commentators have worried about the logical extension of Rakas, especially as it relates to car searches. For example, John Wesley Hall argues that Rakas is fundamentally mistaken in asserting that the petitioners in the case lacked a reasonable expectation of privacy. According to Hall, the undisputed facts suggest that the petitioners could provide evidence that would warrant a reasonable expectation of privacy, as it was clear that they were present in the car with the driver's consent and were utilizing it for transportation alongside the driver. Other commentators, such as Ira Mickenberg, argue that the Jones "legitimately on the premises" test for conferring standing was a radical departure from traditional notions of standing and that Rakas represents the decades-long culmination of a judicial effort to reassert the significance of property rights in deciding Fourth Amendment cases.

== Subsequent history ==
In Rawlings v. Kentucky (1980), the Court ruled that the test enunciated in Rakas—whether the petitioner had a reasonable expectation of privacy in the area searched—is the exclusive test for determining whether a defendant has standing to challenge a search.
