= Personalization =

Using technology to accommodate the differences between individuals

Personalization (broadly known as customization) consists of tailoring a service or product to accommodate specific individuals. It is sometimes tied to groups or segments of individuals. Personalization involves collecting data on individuals, including web browsing history, web cookies, and location. Various organizations use personalization (along with the opposite mechanism of popularization) to improve customer satisfaction, digital sales conversion, marketing results, branding, and improved website metrics as well as for advertising. Personalization acts as a key element in social media and recommender systems. Personalization influences every sector of society—be it work, leisure, or citizenship.

== History ==
The idea of personalization is rooted in ancient rhetoric as part of the practice of an agent or communicator being responsive to the needs of the audience. When industrialization influenced the rise of mass communication, the practice of message personalization diminished for a time.

In the recent times, there has been a significant increase in the number of mass media outlets that use advertising as a primary revenue stream. These companies gain knowledge about the specific demographic and psychographic characteristics of readers and viewers. After that, this information is used to personalize an audience's experience and therefore draw customers in through the use of entertainment and information that interests them.

=== Digital media and the Internet ===
Another aspect of personalization is the increasing relevance of open data on the Internet. Many organizations make their data available on the Internet via APIs, web services, and open data standards. One such example is Ordnance Survey Open Data. Data made available in this way is structured to allow it to be inter-connected and used again by third parties.

Data available from a user's social graph may be accessed by third-party application software so that it fits the personalized web page or information appliance.

Current open data standards on the Internet are:

1. Attention Profiling Mark-up Language (APML)
2. DataPortability
3. OpenID
4. OpenSocial

=== Websites ===
Web pages can be personalized based on their users' characteristics (interests, social category, context, etc.), actions (click on a button, open a link, etc.), intents (make a purchase, check the status of an entity), or any other parameter that is prevalent and associated with an individual. Personalization can also be based on a user's location data. This provides a tailored user experience. Note that the experience is not just the accommodation of the user but a relationship between the user and the desires of the site designers in driving specific actions to attain objectives (e.g. Increase sales conversion on a page). The term customization is often used when the site only uses explicit data which include product ratings or user preferences.

Technically, web personalization can be accomplished by associating a visitor segment with a predefined action. Customizing the user experience based on behavioral, contextual, and technical data is proven to have a positive impact on conversion rate optimization efforts. Associated actions can be anything from changing the content of a webpage, presenting a modal display, presenting interstitials, triggering a personalized email, or even automating a phone call to the user.

According to a study conducted in 2014 at the research firm Econsultancy, less than 30% of e-commerce websites have invested in the field of web personalization. However, many companies now offer services for web personalization as well as web and email recommendation systems that are based on personalization or anonymously collected user behaviors.

There are many categories of web personalization which includes:

1. Behavioral
2. Contextual
3. Technical
4. Historic data
5. Collaboratively filtered

There are several camps in defining and executing web personalization. A few broad methods for web personalization include:

1. Implicit
2. Explicit
3. Hybrid

With implicit personalization, personalization is performed based on data learned from indirect observations of the user. This data can be, for example, items purchased on other sites or pages viewed. With explicit personalization, the web page (or information system) is changed by the user using the features provided by the system. Hybrid personalization combines the above two approaches to leverage both explicit user actions on the system and implicit data.

Web personalization can be linked to the notion of adaptive hypermedia (AH). The main difference is that the former would usually work on what is considered "open corpus hypermedia", while the latter would traditionally work on "closed corpus hypermedia." However, recent research directions in the AH domain take both closed and open corpus into account, making the two fields very inter-related.

Personalization is also being considered for use in less open commercial applications to improve the user experience in the online world. Internet activist Eli Pariser has documented personalized search, where Google and Yahoo! News give different results to different people (even when logged out). He also points out social media site Facebook changes user's friend feeds based on what it thinks they want to see. This creates a clear filter bubble.

Websites use a visitor's location data to adjust content, design, and the entire functionality. On an intranet or B2E Enterprise Web portals, personalization is often based on user attributes such as department, functional area, or the specified role. The term "customization" in this context refers to the ability of users to modify the page layout or specify what content should be displayed.

=== Map personalization ===
Digital web maps are also being personalized. Google Maps change the content of the map based on previous searches and profile information. Technology writer Evgeny Morozov criticized map personalization as a threat to public space. With the wider use of "AI" models into the 2020s, the personalization of map applications has become mainstream.

=== Mobile phones ===
Over time mobile phones have seen an increased attention placed on user personalization. Far from the black and white screens and monophonic ringtones of the past, smart phones now offer interactive wallpapers and MP3 truetones. In the UK and Asia, WeeMees have become popular. WeeMees are 3D characters that are used as wallpaper and respond to the tendencies of the user. Video Graphics Array (VGA) picture quality allows people to change their background without any hassle and without sacrificing quality. All of these services are downloaded by the provider with the goal to make the user feel connected and enhance the experience while using the phone.

=== Print media and merchandise ===
In print media, ranging from magazines to promotional publications, personalization uses databases of individual recipients' information. Not only does the written document address itself by name to the reader, but the advertising is targeted to the recipient's demographics or interests using fields within the database or list, such as "first name", "last name", "company", etc.

The term "personalization" should not be confused with variable data, which is a much more detailed method of marketing that leverages both images and text with the medium, not just fields within a database. Personalized children's books are created by companies who are using and leveraging all the strengths of variable data printing (VDP). This allows for full image and text variability within a printed book. With the rise of online 3D printing services including Shapeways and Ponoko, personalization is becoming present in the world of product design.

==== Promotional merchandise ====
Promotional items (mugs, T-shirts, keychains, balls and more) are personalized on a huge level. Personalized children's storybooks—wherein the child becomes the protagonist, with the name and image of the child personalized—are extremely popular. Personalized CDs for children are also in the market. With the advent of digital printing, personalized calendars that start in any month, birthday cards, cards, e-cards, posters and photo books can also be easily obtained.

==== 3D printing ====
3D printing is a production method that allows to create unique and personalized items on a global scale. Personalized apparel and accessories, such as jewellery, are increasing in popularity. This kind of customization is also relevant in other areas like consumer electronics and retail. By combining 3D printing with complex software a product can easily be customized by an end-user.

== Role of customers ==
=== Mass personalization ===
Mass personalization is the delivery of individualized products or services at scale, combining the efficiency of mass production with adaptive design, data, and process control. In contrast to mass customization—where users often select from predefined variants—mass personalization emphasizes fine-grained tailoring driven by data-enabled models of user needs and contexts, sometimes at the level of "batch size one."

Research distinguishes enabling layers that support mass personalization across digital and physical domains. On the digital side, platforms aggregate and process user, product, and context data to deliver real-time decisions and content. This commonly uses cloud service models such as platform-as-a-service (PaaS)—a managed environment for developing and deploying applications—together with "personalization-as-a-service" architectures that expose personalization functions through APIs.

Within manufacturing, mass personalization is linked to Industry 4.0 concepts, including digital twins, additive manufacturing, industrial IoT, and advanced planning/scheduling. Digital-twin frameworks are studied as a means to synchronize product, process, and usage data in support of individualized designs and operations. Operational studies address order promising, task splitting, and scheduling for flexible systems that must simultaneously meet individualized requirements and capacity constraints.

Service-based production models have been proposed to make personalization economically viable at scale. In mass personalization as a service (MPaaS), personalization capabilities are delivered via modular, service-oriented architectures across the value chain. In parallel, manufacturing-as-a-service (MaaS) and production-as-a-service conceptualize manufacturing resources (machines, skills, and processes) as cloud-like services discoverable and orchestrated through digital platforms, enabling on-demand, highly individualized production (including "batch size one").

Related business-model research links mass personalization to servitization and product-service systems (PSS), including product-as-a-service offerings that provide access to a product's function rather than ownership; these models are studied for their implications on circularity, lifecycle management, and revenue mechanisms.

=== Predictive personalization ===
Predictive personalization is defined as the ability to predict customer behavior, needs or wants—and tailor offers and communications very precisely. Social data is one source of providing this predictive analysis, particularly social data that is structured. Predictive personalization is a much more recent means of personalization and can be used to augment current personalization offerings. Predictive personalization has grown to play an especially important role in online grocers, where users, especially recurring clients, have come to expect "smart shopping lists" – mechanisms that predict what products they need based on customers similar to them and their past shopping behaviors.

== Personalization and power ==
The Volume-Control Model offers an analytical framework to understand how personalization helps to gain power. It links between information personalization and the opposite mechanism, information popularization. This model explains how both personalization and popularization are employed together (by tech companies, organizations, governments or even individuals) as complementing mechanisms to gain economic, political, and social power. Among the social implications of information personalization is the emergence of filter bubbles.

== See also ==
- Adaptation (computer science)
- Adaptive hypermedia
- Behavioral targeting
- Bespoke
- Collaborative filtering
- Configurator
- Mass customization
- Personalized learning
- Popular-personal theory
- Preorder economy
- Real-time marketing
- Recommendation system
- User modeling
- User profile
