= Folger Park =

Park in Washington, D.C., U.S.

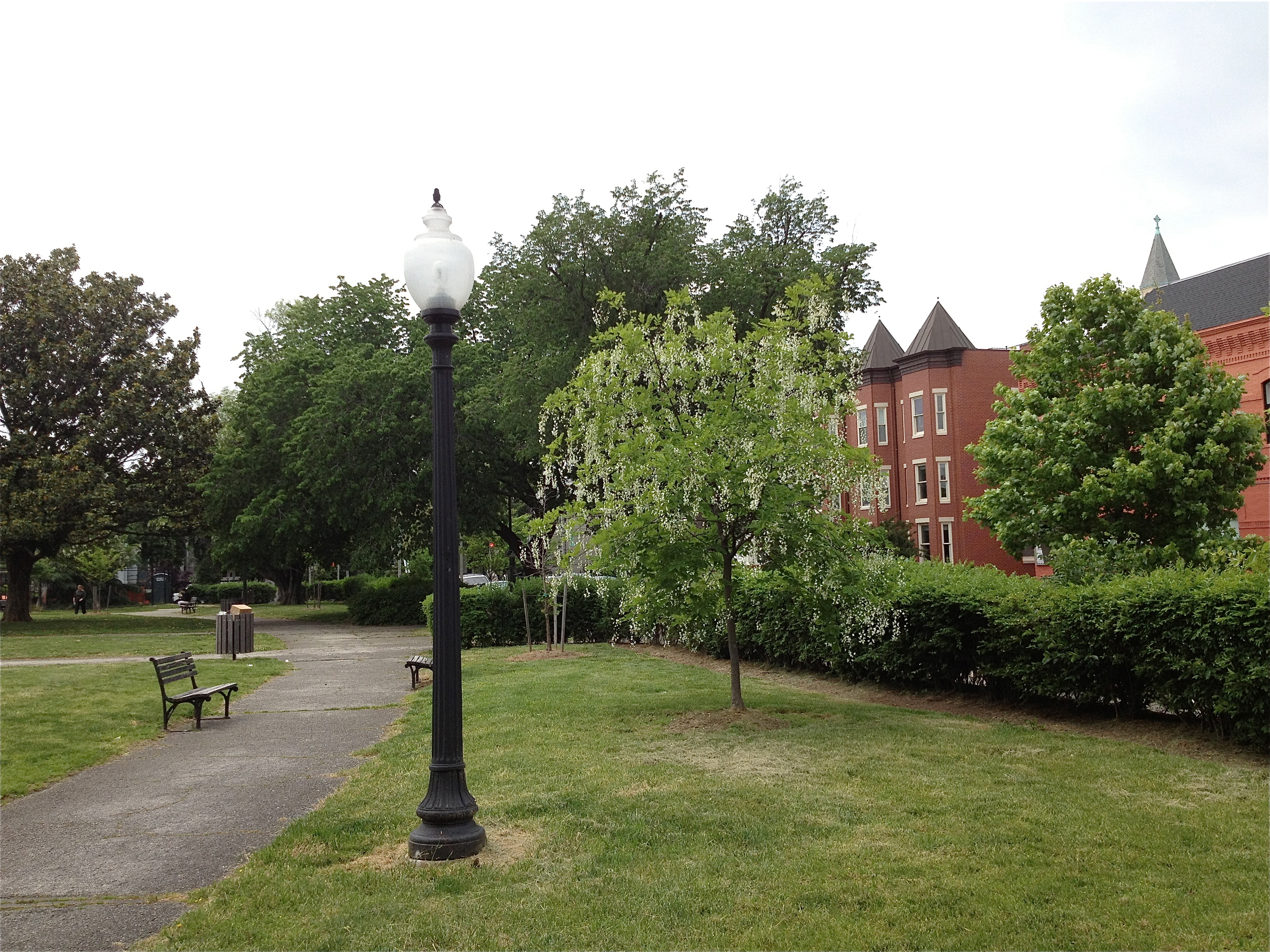
- Folger Park, Capitol Hill

- Location within Washington, D.C.
- Location: Washington, D.C.
- Coordinates: 38°53′05″N 77°00′10″W
- Website: home.nps.gov/cahi/learn/historyculture/cahi_folger.htm

Folger Park is a public park named after former Secretary of the Treasury Charles J. Folger. It is located at 2nd Street and D Street, Southeast, Washington, D.C., in the Capitol Hill neighborhood.

Andrew Ellicott modified Pierre L'Enfant's plan making what was street right of way into open space. Today the park is notable for two large pebble-faced concrete "fountain benches" (no longer containing drinking fountains) that sit on opposite sides of the park, facing each other. The park also contains a variety of trees, including ornamentals. Tree species include the copper beech, southern magnolia, yellowwood, hackberry, eastern redbud, deodar cedar, and American holly.

== Providence Hospital ==
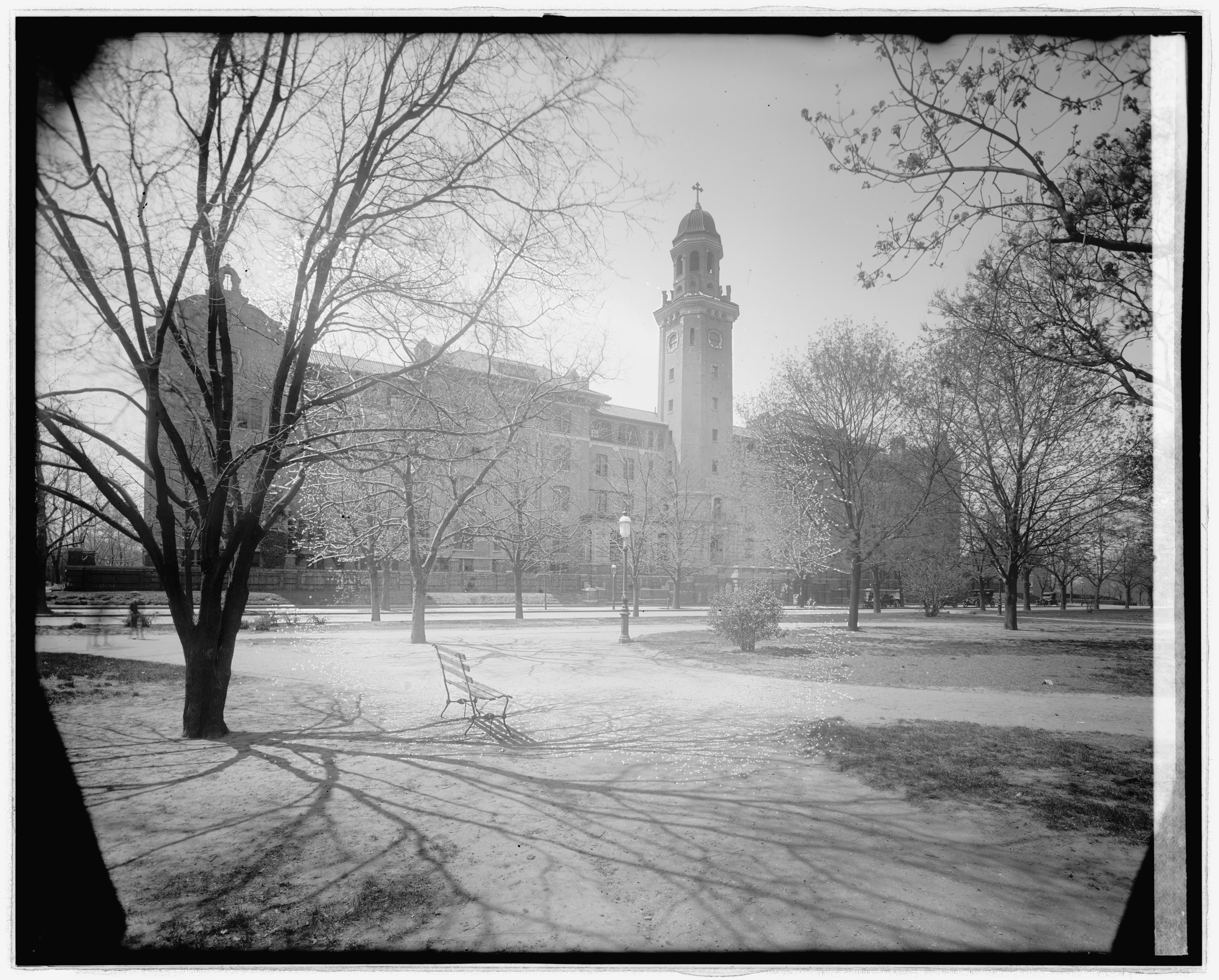
Providence Hospital after Waddy B. Wood's 1904 remodel, viewed looking south across Folger Park, circa 1910 and 1926, Library of Congress Prints and Photographs Division

While Folger Park proper is only the north block, the block to the south, between D and E Streets Southeast is also green space. The block to the south of Folger Park was the original site of Providence Hospital. The hospital was founded in 1861 by the Daughters of Charity. They originally rented a house at the corner of Second and D Streets, but soon acquired the entire block. In 1864 President Abraham Lincoln signed an Act of Congress authorizing funds for the construction of a five-story brick Second Empire-style building with Italianate features. In 1904 the building was expanded to four times its original capacity and remodeled into a Mission style, including the 175-foot bell tower, according to the design of architect Waddy Butler Wood. With the hospital dominating the area, Folger Park was originally known as Providence Hospital Square or the Square North of Providence Hospital.

The hospital had deteriorated by 1947 and rather than shut down for a two-year remodel, in March 1956 the trustees relocated the hospital to its current 36-acre site at 1150 Varnum St. NE, near Catholic University. The hospital building was demolished in 1964.

The block was designated in 1978 as Providence Park.
