= Waddy Butler Wood =

American architect (1869-1944)

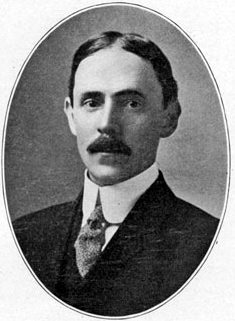
- Wood c. 1900
- Born: 1869; St. Louis, Missouri, U.S.
- Died: January 25, 1944 (aged 74–75); Warrenton, Virginia, U.S.
- Occupation: Architect
- Known for: Woodrow Wilson House; Main Interior Building
- Spouse: Elizabeth Lomax
- Children: 2
- Relatives: Virginia Hargraves Wood (sister), Lunsford L. Lomax (father in-law)

Waddy Butler Wood (1869 – January 25, 1944) was an American architect of the early 20th century and resident of Washington, D.C. Although Wood designed and remodeled numerous private residences, his reputation rested primarily on his larger commissions, such as banks, commercial offices, and government buildings. His most notable works include the Woodrow Wilson House and the Main Interior Building.

== Early life and education ==
Waddy Wood was born in St. Louis in 1869, to Charles Wood, a Virginian and former Confederate States Army captain who had moved west to seek better opportunities. Shortly after his birth, the Woods returned to Virginia and settled in Albemarle County. He grew up in an house named "Nutwood" in Ivy, Virginia, near the Wood family estate of "Spring Hill," the former home of his grandfather, John Wood Jr.

== Early career ==
In 1892, Wood began working as an architect in Washington, D.C. His first important commissions were on two streetcar barns. The first was Metropolitan Railroad's East Capitol Street Car Barn, which he helped to design with engineer A.N. Connett in 1896. The following year, he designed the Georgetown Car Barn, then known as Union Station, for the Capital Traction Company. During this time, Wood also designed several homes in what was then known as Kalorama Heights (now Adams Morgan).

== Wood, Donn & Deming ==
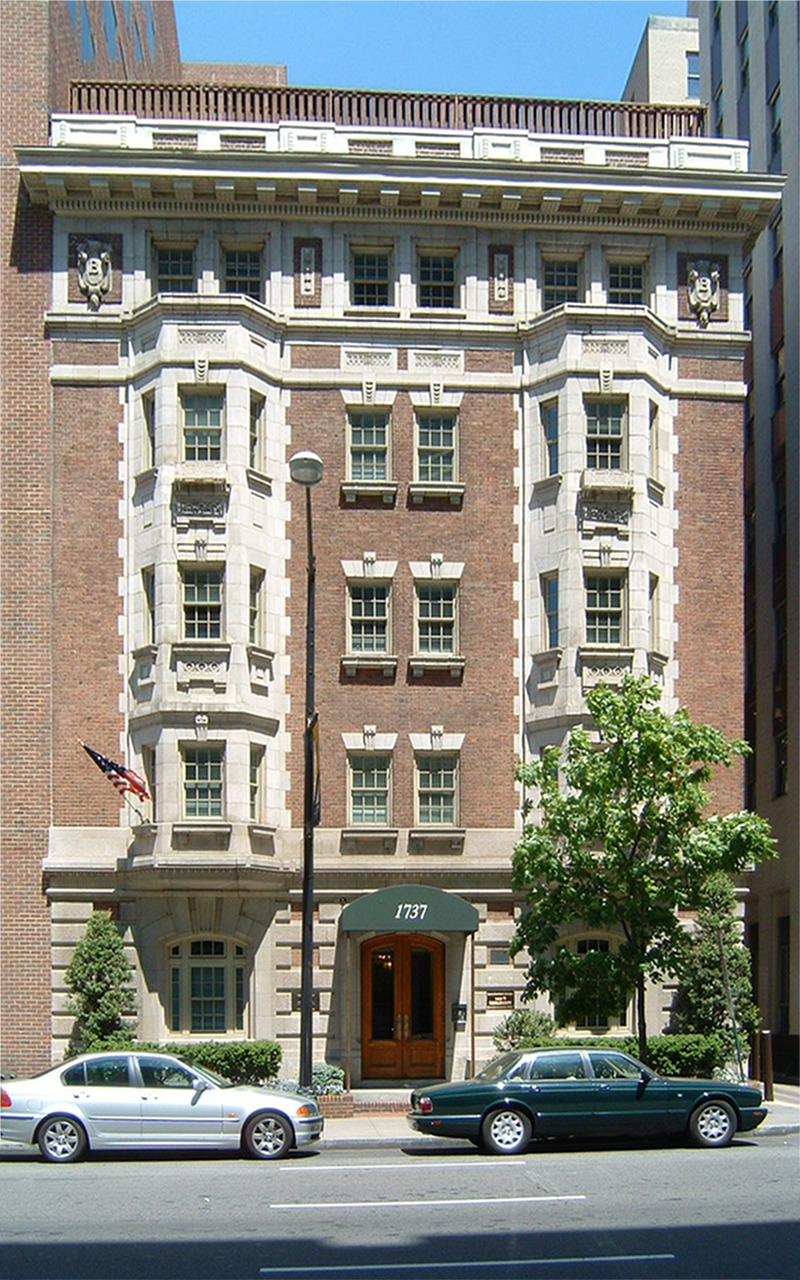
Bachelor Apartment House a.k.a. "The Bachelor" in Washington, D.C.

In 1902, he began an association with Edward Donn Jr. and William I. Deming, forming the firm of Wood, Donn and Deming in Washington, D.C. The firm was highly successful in providing services to various branches of government. Its designs can be found throughout the United States, including the expansion of the Portsmouth Naval Hospital in Portsmouth, Virginia. They also had a strong residential client base designing houses for prominent citizens such as Mrs. Phil Sheridan, General Charles Lane Fitzhugh, and Thomas Hopkins Gallaudet; as well as public residences such as the Bachelor Apartment House near the White House.

In 1906, Wood, Donn & Deming became the first Washington, D.C., architectural firm to design a bank high-rise in their city: the Union Trust Building, now home to the New America Foundation and Joe's, the DC location of a high-end steak and seafood chain. The building is also listed on the National Register of Historic Places. In the past, the city's largest banks had retained nationally renowned architects while local architects were only chosen to design bank branches or remodel existing buildings. By choosing Wood's firm, Union Trust began a trend of the city's banks choosing local architects to design their buildings.

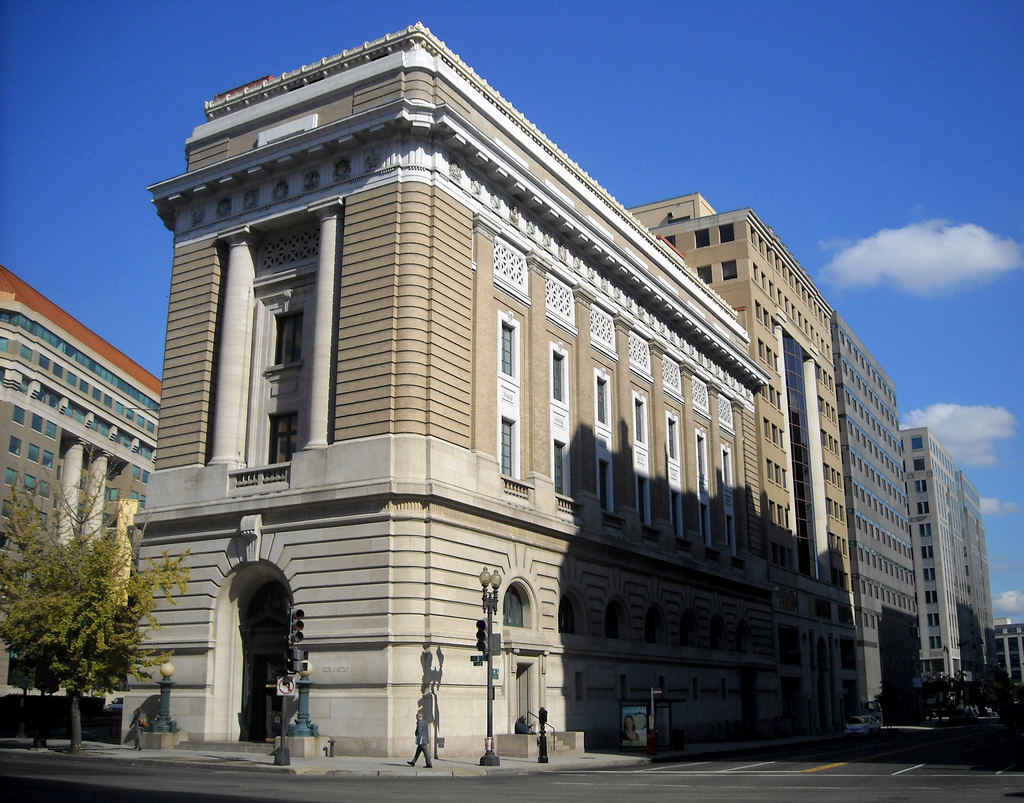
National Museum of Women in the Arts, originally a Masonic temple, in Washington, D.C.

Wood's partnership with Donn and Deming is best known for the firm's work in 1907 on the Masonic temple located at the intersection of 13th Street, H Street, and New York Avenue NW, which is now the National Museum of Women in the Arts. The 69,000-square-foot (6,400 m^{2}) building, a specimen of neo-Renaissance and Renaissance Revival styles, was declared a Washington, D.C. Historic Landmark in 1984 and added to the National Register of Historic Places in 1987.

In addition to the Masonic lodge hall, the building originally housed professional offices, the George Washington University law library, and a movie theater. The exterior has never been altered substantially. As the Temple Association envisioned, the building's location at the tip of a wedge-shaped block provides an aesthetic buffer zone which "permits of no future building being erected sufficiently near to mar [the Temple's] monumental effect ... ."

Despite the successes of Wood, Donn and Deming, his use of occult masonic symbolism and features was not universally appreciated and the firm was dissolved in 1912.

== Personal practice ==
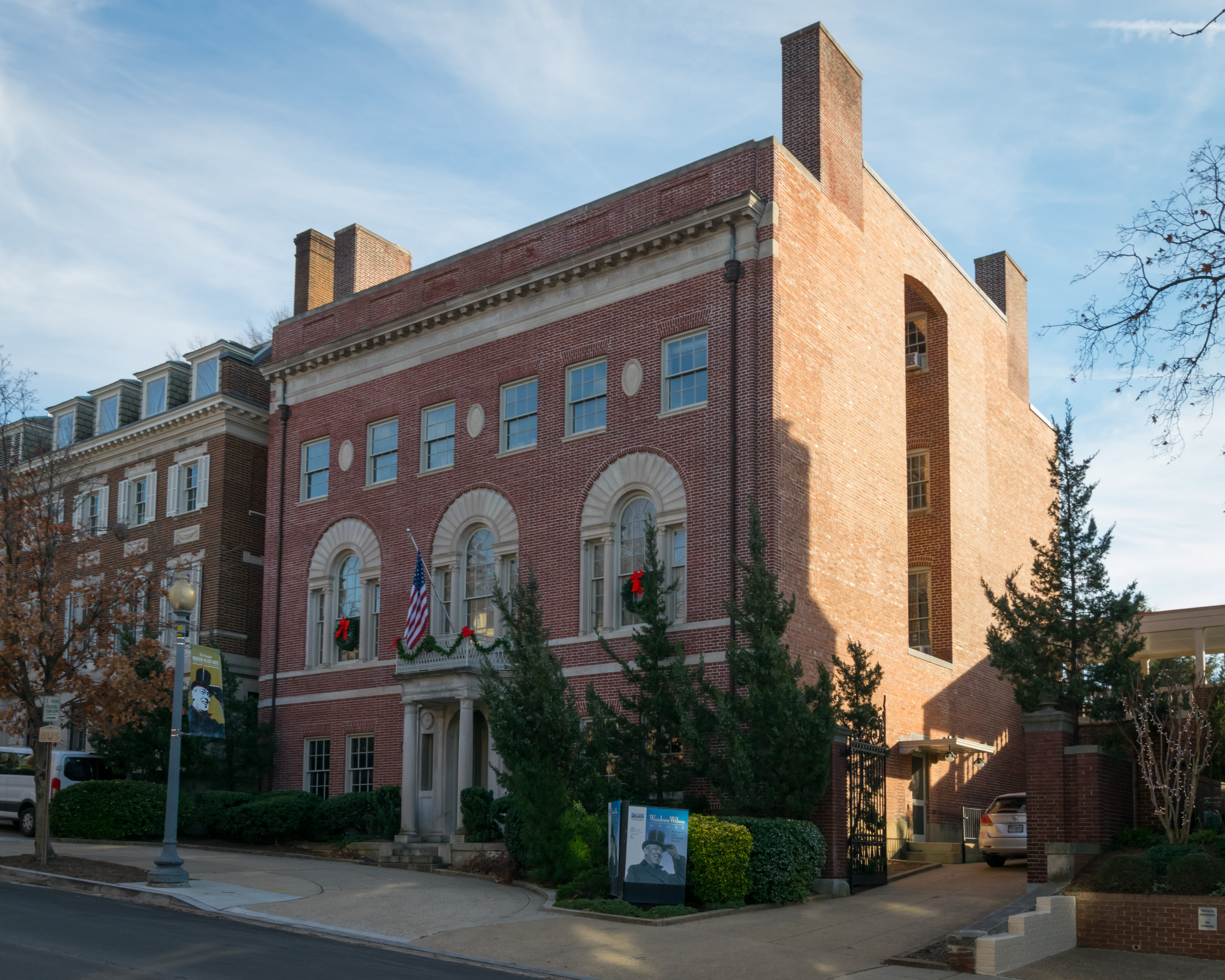
The Woodrow Wilson House, designed by Wood in 1915, is a fine example of the Georgian Revival Style architecture.

Waddy Wood created his most famous buildings after he left Wood, Donn & Deming. In 1915, he built a home for Henry Parker Fairbanks, which was purchased by Woodrow Wilson in 1920 and became the Woodrow Wilson House (or the Fairbanks-Wilson house). As his reputation grew, his client list became quite prominent. He designed a home for Howe P. Corcoran and remodeled the interior of Senator Oscar Underwood's home, Woodlawn, in Fairfax County, Virginia, a home originally designed by William Thornton, which Wood had worked on previously during his association with Donn and Deming.

In the late 1910s, Wood was featured in an exhibition—at the famous Octagon—of architectural drawings by Washington architects. In 1920 after the Octagon exhibit, Wood was selected to present drawings for the National Architectural Exhibition at the Corcoran Galleries. The drawings selected were a mix of works between 1914 and 1920. A larger number were drawings of United States Housing Corporation buildings that he designed to house World War I workers. He also featured commercial buildings, such as the Shoreham Hotel and Commercial National Bank. His residential work featured at the exhibit included the Lawrence Lee Residence.

During World War I, Wood designed many temporary wartime buildings in Washington. He did not take a fee for the cost of designing the buildings and as a result was praised by Franklin D. Roosevelt, then a partner of the law firm Roosevelt and O'Connor of New York City. Roosevelt and Wood first became associated when Wood designed a house for Roosevelt's uncle, Frederic Delano. Wood was active in the Democratic Party and their relationship continued after Roosevelt became president. Wood was commissioned to design the inauguration court of honor for President Roosevelt, as he had done for Roosevelt's predecessor, Woodrow Wilson.

Wood was a proponent of the Colonial Revival style. In a 1922 article authored by Wood and published in Country Life magazine, he stated that architecture was "frozen history" and evidence of our past. His romantic view of buildings and architecture had its source in the days of the Colonial period, when craftsmen considered their buildings an art form. His promotion of the Colonial Revival extended beyond the romantic view of the link between our past and present to the economic sensibilities of the early 20th century. He argued that the heavy articulation of the Craftsman style was much more costly than the Colonial Revival which is more delicate and simplified.

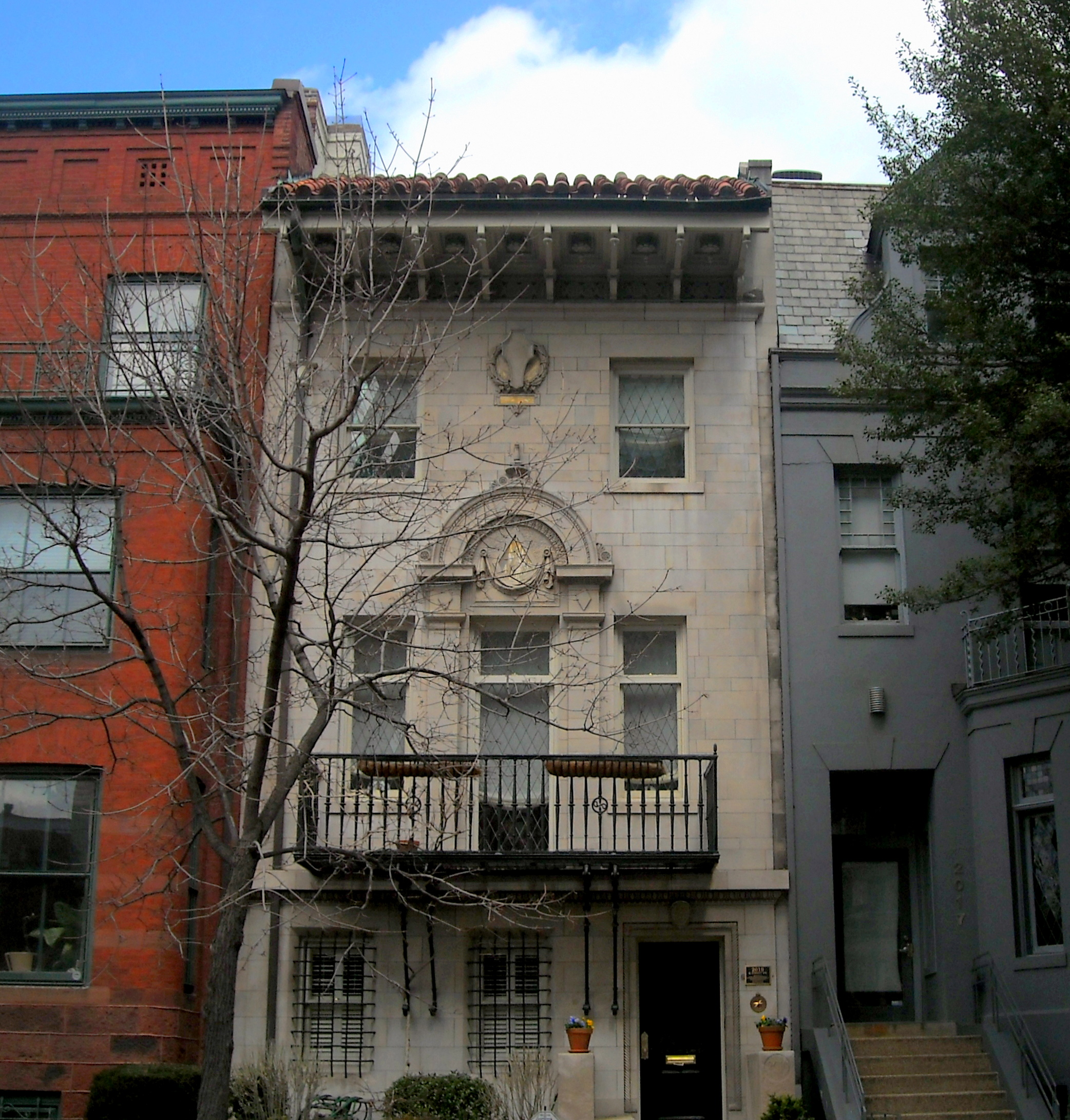
The former residence of Wood, which he designed in 1910, is located in the Dupont Circle neighborhood of Washington, D.C.

While many urban architects of the early 20th century applied classical design values with little adaptation, Wood spoke for an emerging school that regarded classical design as an accent to inspire and punctuate modern design.

Though his government buildings are his most prominent, Wood was also recognized for his housing design. His former partner, William I. Deming, was skilled in the restoration of old homes, and during Wood's association with Deming he was exposed to numerous renovations of historic houses in Virginia. He designed housing largely in Washington, DC, but also in Virginia for private clients, and some government clients. In addition, he designed school buildings for the Washington, DC school system.

His greatest work is the Department of the Interior Headquarters Building in Washington, DC. Then Secretary of the Interior Harold Ickes personally selected Waddy Wood as architect and worked very closely with him to ensure comfort and efficiency in the innovative new building. He was so involved with the design and construction of the Interior building that when the building opened, it was referred to as "Ickes new home."

The Interior building is seven stories with a basement (an additional floor between the fifth and sixth stories is devoted entirely to mechanical equipment). Above the central axis is a setback eighth story. The building is arranged into six east–west wings connected by a central north–south spine. This massing creates ten U-shaped courts, allowing each of the 2200 rooms an exterior exposure.

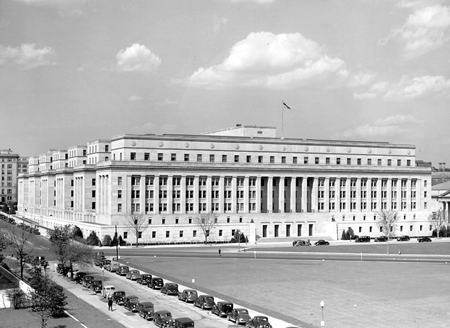
United States Department of the Interior headquarters, seen here in the late 1930s, was designed by Wood

The Interior building featured a number of 'firsts' for Federal buildings: the first to have a central vacuum cleaning system, one of the earliest to be air-conditioned, and one of the first to incorporate a parking garage in the building. The somewhat austere 'Moderne' exterior belies the interior's abundant artwork and ornamentation. The building's 3 miles (5 km) of corridors are lined with many murals and sculpture. Six Native American artists painted more than 2,200 square feet (200 m^{2}) of murals.

The central corridor contains the Grand Staircase and has a checkered marble floor, bronze railings and a coffered plaster ceiling. A pair of marble bas reliefs by Boris Gilbertson adorn the walls: one of moose and the other of buffalo. The buffalo motif is found throughout the building including in the Departmental Seal and on the doorknobs of the Secretary of the Interior's Executive Suite. The Executive Suite has oak paneling with a marble fireplace. Besides offices, the building contains an auditorium, museum, Indian arts and crafts gift shop, library, post office and gymnasium-all part of the original design.

In addition to his work, Waddy Wood served as the president of the Washington Chapter of the American Institute of Architects. In that capacity, he said in a 1928 speech "We will eventually build up a modern style of architecture based on evolution and not revolution, which has to rest, as all civilization does, on a foundation of precedent."

He died at his home near Warrenton, Virginia, January 25, 1944.

== Personal life ==
His sister Virginia Hargraves Wood (1872–1941) was a noted painter and illustrator in New York City.

Wood was married to Elizabeth Lindsay Lomax, the daughter of Lunsford L. Lomax. Together they had two children. He named his youngest daughter Virginia Hargraves Wood (born 1906–?; also known as Virginia Wood Riggs), after his sister; and she was also a painter and a WPA muralist.

== Works ==
Many of the works are listed in the National Register of Historic Places (NRHP), and are noted in this list.

=== Waddy Wood, early works ===
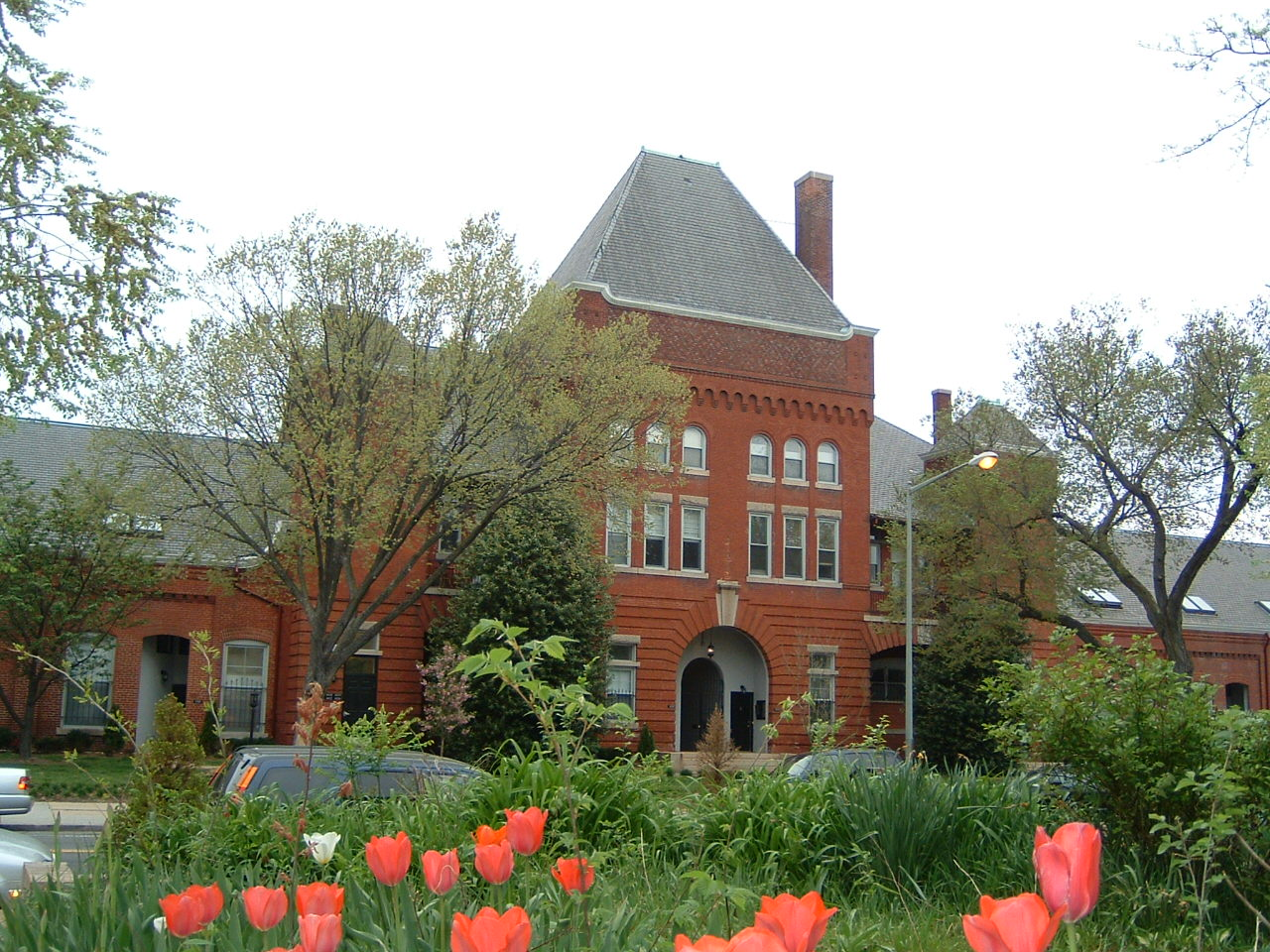
East Capitol Street Car Barn

- 2121 Bancroft Place, NW, Washington, D.C.; 1895; Five-story brick town home, Wood's former residence
- East Capitol Street Car Barn, 1400 E. Capitol St., NE, Washington, D.C.; 1896, Romanesque design also known as the Metropolitan Car Barn 1974; NRHP-listed
- Georgetown Car Barn, 3600 M Street, NW, Washington, D.C.; 1897
- 1790–1796 Columbia Road, NW, Washington, D.C.; 1897–1898, Wood lived in the house at 1796 Columbia Road from 1899 to 1900 and at 1794 Columbia Road from 1900 to 1902, 1790 has been razed
- 3100 Newark Street, NW, Washington, D.C.; 1897; introduced the Shingle style to Cleveland Park
- 3432 Newark Street, NW, Washington, D.C.; 1897; introduced the Mission Revival to Cleveland Park
- 2437–2445 18th Street, NW, Washington, D.C.; 1897, 2455 has been razed
- 2481–2483 18th Street, NW, Washington, D.C.; 1899
- 1743 N Street, NW, Washington, D.C.; 1896; Italian Renaissance; restored as part of 1745n.com residences project. (2016–2018)
- 1745 N Street, NW, Washington, D.C.; 1902; Georgian Revival; restored as part of 1745n.com residences project (2016–2018)

=== Wood, Donn & Deming ===
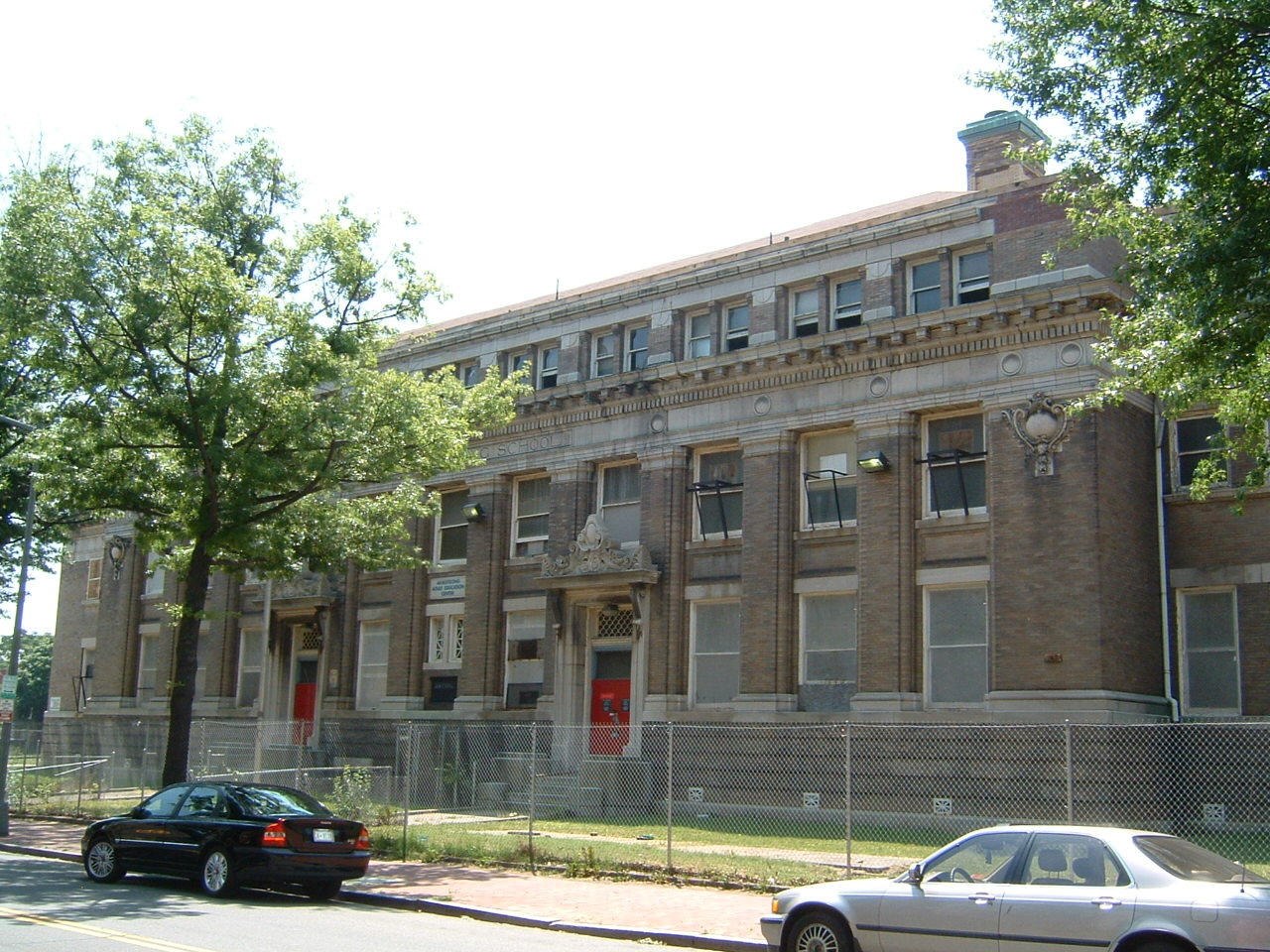
Armstrong Manual Training School

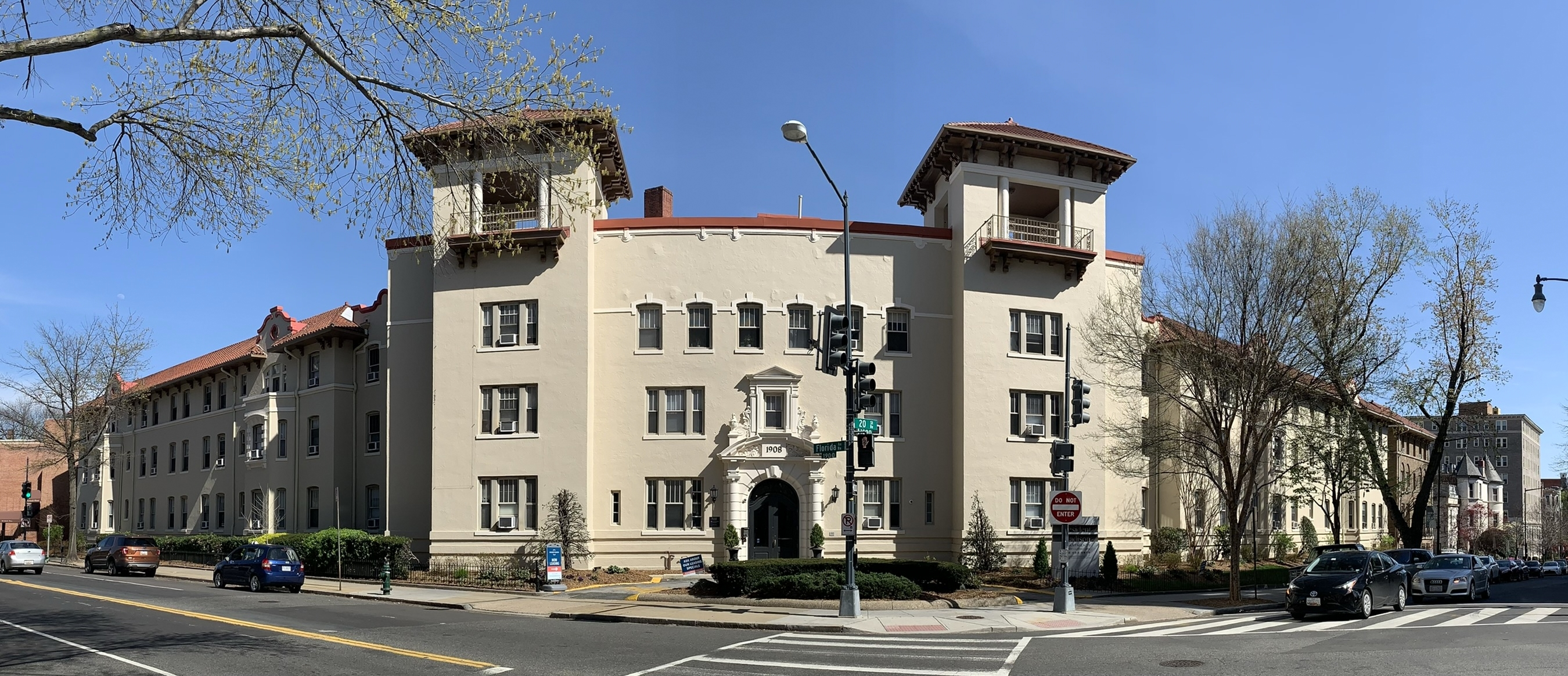
President Madison Apartments

- Expansion of Portsmouth Naval Hospital, on Hospital Point at Washington and Crawford Sts., Portsmouth, Virginia; 1902, also known as Norfolk Naval Hospital, 1972; NRHP-listed
- Armstrong Manual Training School, Jct. of 1st and P Sts., NW, Washington, D.C.; 1902, 1996; NRHP-listed
- Chinese Legation, 2001 19th Street, NW, Washington, D.C; 1902; now condominiums
- Thomas P. Morgan Elementary School, 1773 California Street, NW, Washington, D.C.; 1902; the "Morgan" of Adams Morgan, razed prior to 1971
- Alice Pike Barney Studio House, 2306 Massachusetts Avenue, NW, Washington, D.C.; 1902; now the Embassy of Latvia, 1995; NRHP-listed
- Rectory and school building at St. Patrick's Church, 619 Tenth Street, NW, Washington, D.C.; 1904 in English gothic style
- 1810–1820 19th Street, NW, Washington, D.C., which includes the L. Ron Hubbard House (and part of the Dupont Circle Historic District); NRHP-listed
- Enlarge and remodel Old Providence Hospital, Folger Square, SE, Washington, D.C.; 1904, razed 1964
- Bachelor Apartment House (a.k.a. "The Bachelor"), 1737 H Street, NW, Washington, D.C.; 1905, 1978; NRHP-listed
- Douglas House, Washington, D.C.; 1905, built for Charles A. Douglas, razed in 1949
- The Cordova (now the President Madison Apartments), 1908 Florida Avenue NW; 1905
- Emmanuel Church, US 250, Greenwood, Virginia; 1905–1915, 1982; NRHP-listed
- Geophysical Laboratory of the Carnegie Institution, 2801 Upton Street, NW, Washington, D.C.; 1906; now the Levine School of Music, 1994; NRHP-listed
- Capital Traction Company Car Barn, 4615 14th Street, NW, Washington DC; 1906, also known as the Decatur Street Car Barn; NRHP-listed
- Union Trust Building, 740 15th St. NW, Washington, D.C.; 1907; Also known as First American Bank Building, 1984, currently the American Bar Association Building; NRHP-listed
- 1904 T Street NW, Washington, DC; 1907, annexed by Gunston Hall School in 1926, razed in 1965
- Masonic Temple, 1250 New York Avenue, NW, Washington, D.C.; 1907; now the National Museum of Women in the Arts, 1987; NRHP-listed
- Enlarge and remodel the Faulkner House for Senator Thomas S. Martin, 2201 Old Ivy Road, Charlottesville, Virginia; 1907, also known as Seymour, Montesano, Garallen or Old Ivy Inn, 1984; NRHP-listed
- 1845 Belmont Road, NW, Washington, D.C.; 1907, razed
- 2001 19th Street, NW, Washington, D.C.; 1908
- 1929–1933 19th Street, NW, Washington, D.C.; 1908, built for Charles H. Davidson (1929 & 1931) (1931 & 1933)
- Norfolk YMCA building, Norfolk, VA; 1908–1910
- Edgewood, Rt 231, Cash Corner, Keswick, Virginia; 1911, built for ambassador George Barclay Rives, served as home for singer-songwriter Art Garfunkel, and movie director Hugh Wilson
- Remodel Woodlawn Plantation, W of junction of U.S. 1 and Rte. 235, Fairfax, Virginia; 1970; NRHP-listed
- Ellwood (Leesburg, Virginia), Leesburg, Virginia (1911–1912); NRHP-listed

=== Waddy Wood, late works ===
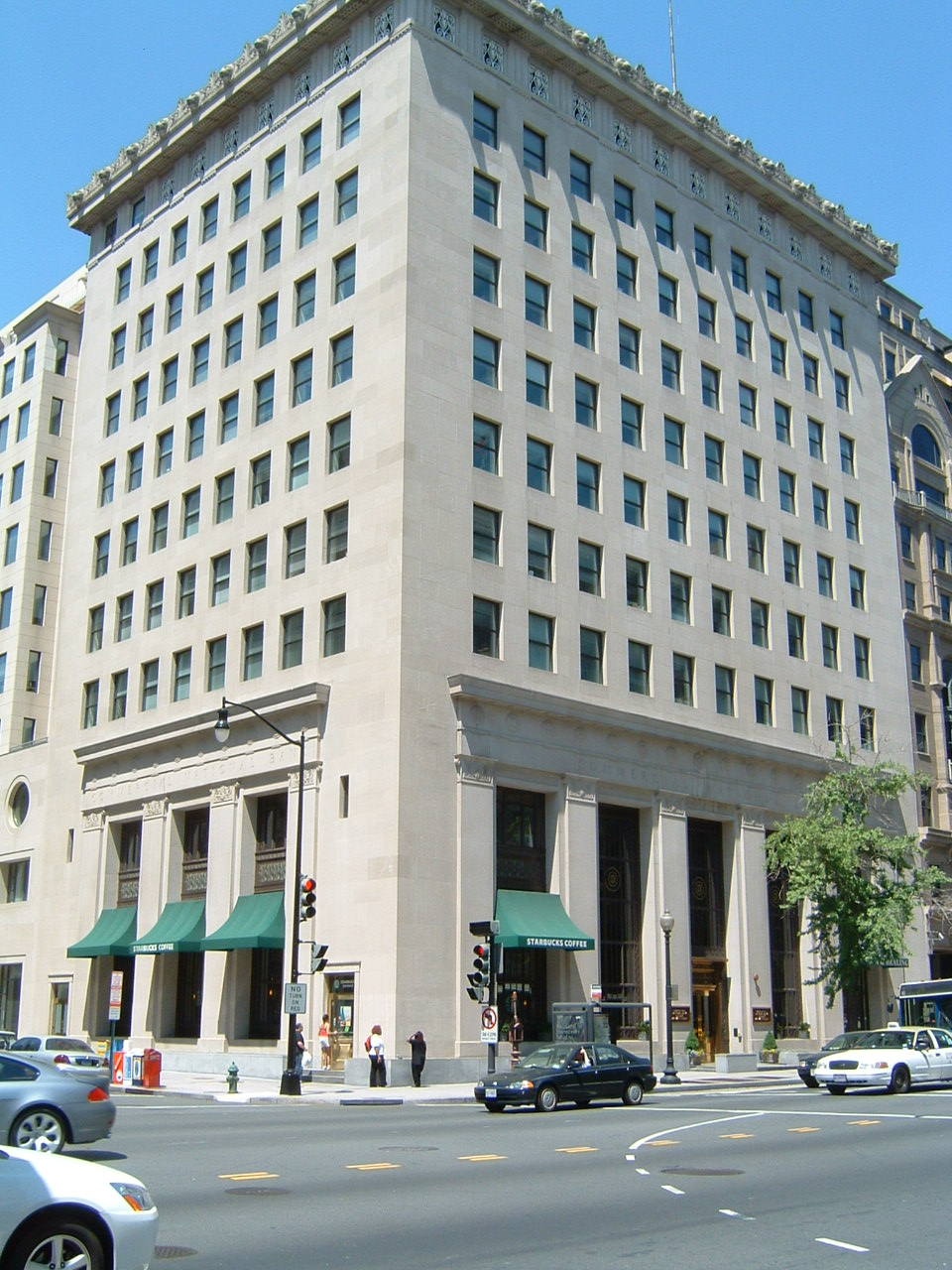
Commercial National Bank Building

- Meadowbrook School, Leesburg, Virginia; 1912–1913
- Providence Hospital, 1150 Varnum St., NE, Washington, D.C.; 1912–1918
- Tucker House, 2320 S Street, NW, Washington, D.C.; 1913; was the Textile Museum, now the home of Jeff Bezos 1973; NRHP-listed
- Greystone, 2325 Porter Street, NW, Washington, D.C.; 1913
- Carnegie Institute, Dept. of Terrestrial Magnetism Laboratory, 5241 Broad Branch Road, NW, Washington, D.C.; 1913–1914
- Washington Baseball Club, Washington, D.C.; 1914–1921
- 9134 Grant Avenue, Manassas, Virginia; 1915
- Woodrow Wilson House; 2340 S Street, NW, Washington, D.C.; 1915, also known as the Fairbanks-Wilson House, 1966; NRHP-listed
- Bushfield Manor renovation and addition, 367 Club House Loop, Mount Holly, Virginia; 1916, 2004; NRHP-listed
- Council of National Defense building, Washington, D.C.; 1917–1918
- Food Administration building, Washington, D.C.; 1918–1919
- War Industries Board and War Trade Board buildings, Washington, D.C.; 1918–1919
- United States Housing Corp., Washington, D.C.; 1918–1921
- Commercial National Bank Building, 700 14th St, NW, Washington, D.C.; 1919, 1991; NRHP-listed
- Martha Jefferson House, 1600 Gordon Ave, Charlottesville, Virginia; 1920–21, previously known as Ackley, then converted into a retirement home
- Thomas Balch Library, 208 W. Market St., Leesburg, Virginia; 1922
- Delano, Frederic A., residence, Washington, D.C.; 1922–1928
- 2449 Tracy Place NW, Washington, D.C.; 1923
- Gunston Hall (Biltmore Forest, North Carolina), 324 Vanderbilt Rd., Biltmore Forest, NC; 1923, 1991; NRHP-listed
- Blue Ridge Farm, Rt 637 & Rt 691, Greenwood, Virginia; 1923–1927, 1991; NRHP-listed
- The Glenn Building, 110 Marietta Street, Atlanta, Georgia; 1923, now the Glenn Hotel
- All States Hotel for Women Government Employees, now William Mitchell Hall, an undergraduate residence hall at The George Washington University, 514 19th Street, NW, Washington, D.C.; 1925.

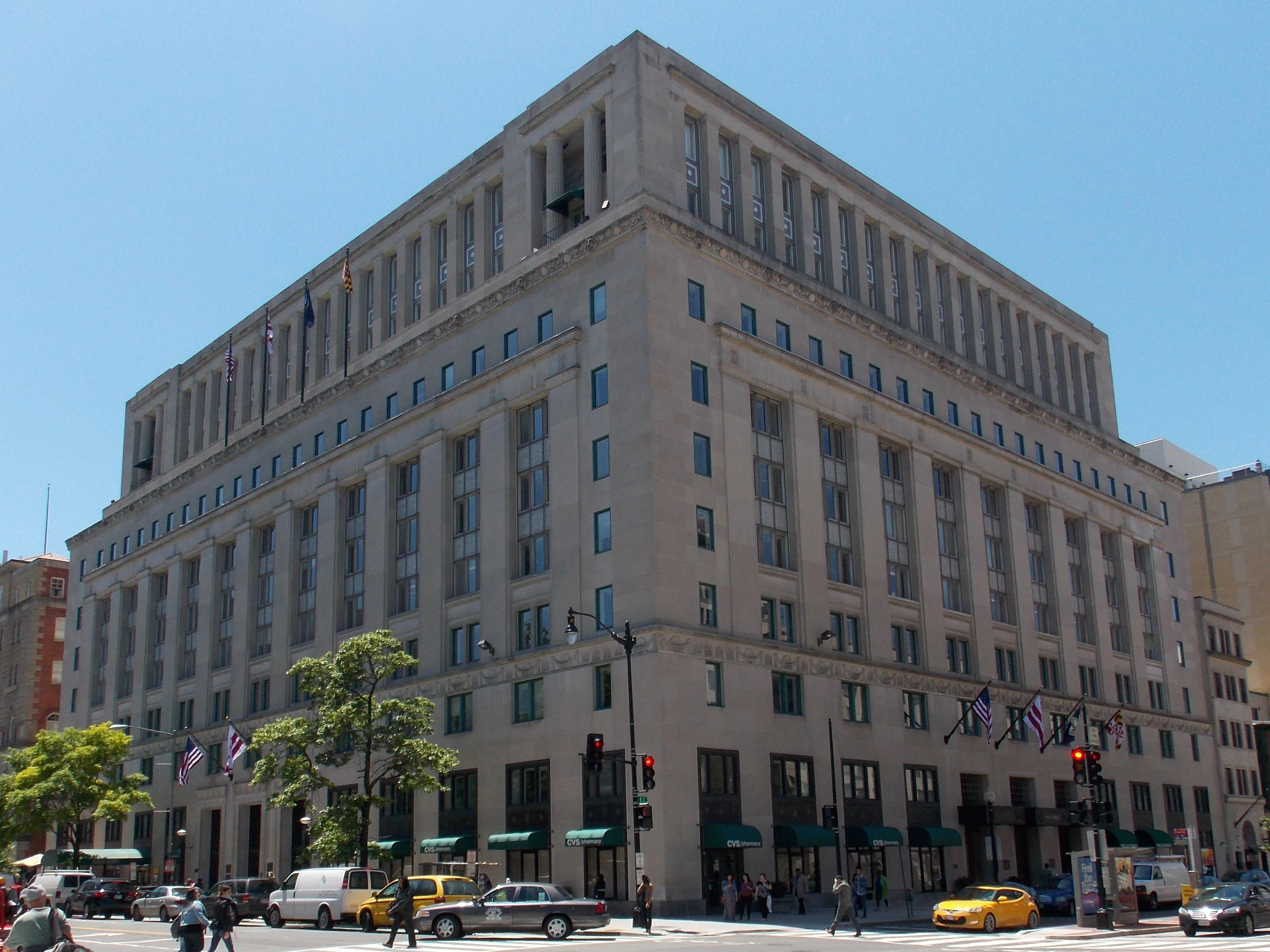
Southern Railway Building

- The Victor Building Addition, 724–726 9th Street, NW, Washington, D.C.; 1925
- Brightwood Elementary School, 1300 Nicholson St., NW, Washington, D.C.; 1926
- Methodist Home for Aged, Washington, D.C.; 1926
- Chevy Chase Club and homes nearby, Chevy Chase, Maryland; 1926
- Southern Railway Building, 1500 K Street, NW, Washington, D.C.; 1928
- Handford MacNidor residence, Mason City, Iowa, 1929
- 1901 23rd Street, NW, Washington, D.C.; 1929; Neo-classical and Georgian Revival
- 1909 23rd Street, NW, Washington, D.C.; 1929; Neo-classical and Georgian Revival - built for his daughter.
- Fauquier County Hospital, Warrenton, Virginia; 1932
- The Diplomatic and Consular Officers Memorial - now in the State Department Building; 1933
- U. S. Department of the Interior headquarters building, 1849 C Street, NW, Washington, D.C.; 1934–1938, 1986; NRHP-listed
- National Training School for Girls, 605 50th Street, NE Washington, D.C.; 1936; now the Nannie Helen Burroughs School
