= Woodrow Wilson House (Washington, D.C.) =

Historic house in Washington, D.C., United States

- U.S. National Register of Historic Places
- U.S. National Historic Landmark
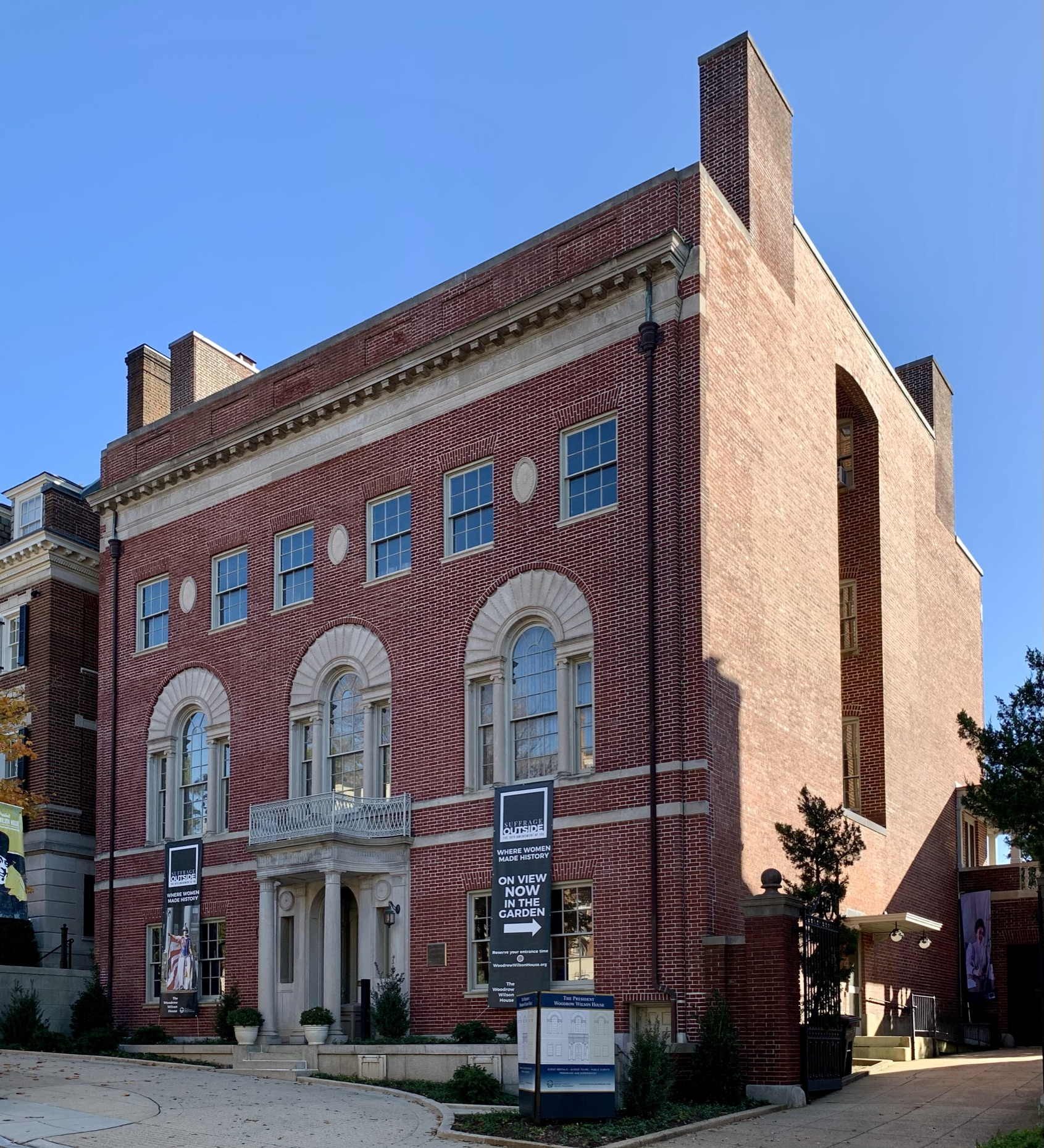
- The Woodrow Wilson House in November 2020

- Location within Washington, D.C.
- Location: 2340 S St., NW; Washington, D.C., U.S.
- Coordinates: 38°54′50″N 77°3′6″W
- Area: less than 1-acre (4,000 m^{2})
- Built: 1915
- Architect: Waddy Butler Wood
- Architectural style: Georgian Revival
- NRHP reference No.: 66000873

Significant dates
- Added to NRHP: October 15, 1966
- Designated NHL: July 19, 1964

The Woodrow Wilson House was the residence of the 28th president of the United States, Woodrow Wilson after he left office. It is at 2340 S Street NW just off Washington, D.C.'s Embassy Row, and it's located in the Sheridan-Kalorama Historic District. On February 3, 1924, Wilson died in an upstairs bedroom. It was designated a National Historic Landmark in 1964. The National Trust for Historic Preservation owns the house and operates it as a museum.

== History ==
The house was built by Henry Fairbanks in 1915 on a design by prominent masonic Washington architect Waddy Wood. President Woodrow Wilson bought it in the last months of his second term as President of the United States as a gift to his wife, Edith Bolling Wilson. He presented her the deed in December 1920, although he had never seen the house. The former president and his wife moved into the home on Inauguration Day, which in 1921 was March 4 (not the current date of January 20). Wilson made several modifications to the house, including a billiard room, stacks for his library of over 8,000 books, and a one-story brick garage.

It was from the balcony of the house that Wilson addressed a crowd on November 11, 1923, as his last public appearance. While the Wilsons had few guests, former British Prime Minister David Lloyd George and former French Prime Minister Georges Clemenceau visited the ailing former president at the house. Woodrow typically met guests at exactly 3:30 pm in his library, which was outfitted with a fireplace and tufted furniture.

After Wilson's death in 1924, many of the books inside the house were donated to the Library of Congress. Edith Wilson lived in the residence until her death on December 28, 1961. She hosted First Lady Jacqueline Kennedy for a brunch in the formal dining room. Edith bequeathed the property and all of its original furnishings to the National Trust for Historic Preservation upon her death.

== Beyond the Wikipedia Page: A Deeper Look at the Woodrow Wilson House ==
The Woodrow Wilson House is usually described as the final residence of President Woodrow Wilson, but the official site adds more detail about how the house actually functioned as a home and a symbol of his post-presidency life. While Wikipedia focuses on basic facts like its construction in 1915 and its designation as a historic landmark, the Wilson House article explains that the home was originally built for a private owner and designed with modern features like a telephone intercom system and updated kitchen technology. (President Wilson House) It also emphasizes that when Wilson and his wife Edith moved in after leaving the White House in 1921, the house became a center of social and political life, where they hosted important international figures even during his declining health. (President Wilson House) This gives a more personal and lived-in view of the house compared to the more structural description on Wikipedia.

Another major difference is how the Wilson House website highlights the people who lived and worked there, not just the president himself. Wikipedia mainly mentions Wilson and Edith, but the secondary source goes deeper into the lives of residents on S Street, especially staff members like Isaac and Mary Scott. These individuals were not just employees—they played a long-term role in managing the household and caring for Wilson during his illness. (President Wilson House) The article also mentions extended family members, like Edith Wilson’s brother, who lived in the house and worked as Wilson’s secretary. (President Wilson House) This broader perspective shows that the house was more than a presidential residence; it was a shared space shaped by multiple people whose contributions were valued heavily.

Finally, the Wilson House article brings attention to Edith Wilson and unique historical moments tied to the home that are barely emphasized elsewhere. While Wikipedia notes that Edith lived there until 1961, the secondary source makes it clearer that she preserved the house intentionally as a legacy site and later donated it to the National Trust. (President Wilson House) It also highlights a major historical event: in 1923, Wilson gave what is described as the first nationwide remote radio broadcast from the house to mark Armistice Day. (President Wilson House) This detail is especially important because it shows how the house was connected to broader technological and national developments, not just personal history.

== See also ==
- List of residences of presidents of the United States
- Presidential memorials in the United States
