= Woodstock Hall Tavern =

Historic commercial building in Virginia, United States

- U.S. National Register of Historic Places
- Virginia Landmarks Register
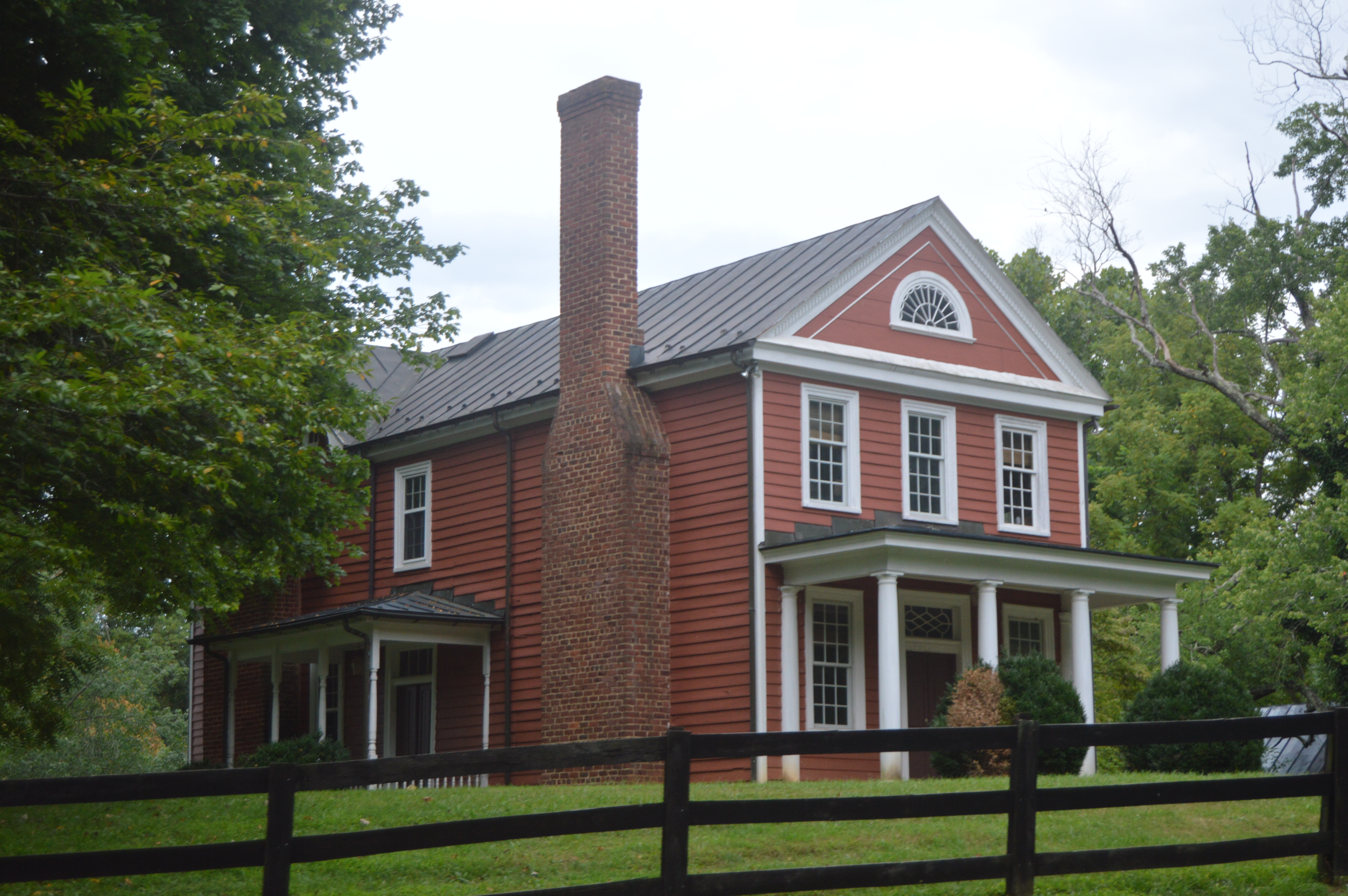
- Front and eastern side

- Location within Virginia Location within the United States
- Location: VA 637, Ivy, Virginia
- Coordinates: 38°1′37″N 78°37′53″W
- Area: 5.9 acres (2.4 ha)
- Built: 1757, 1808
- Architectural style: Federal
- NRHP reference No.: 86003735
- VLR No.: 002-0417

Significant dates
- Added to NRHP: January 29, 1987
- Designated VLR: February 18, 1986

Woodstock Hall Tavern, also known as the Woods-Tavern, Woodstock Hall, and Hilandale, is a historic tavern located at Ivy, Albemarle County, Virginia. It was built in 1757, and enlarged by the addition of a front wing in 1808. It consists of the original two-story, frame hall-parlor dwelling, with the addition of the temple-front, Federal-style wing. It is one of Albemarle County's oldest extant structures.

It was added to the National Register of Historic Places in 1987.
