= East Capitol Car Barn =

Historic building in Washington, D.C.

- U.S. National Register of Historic Places
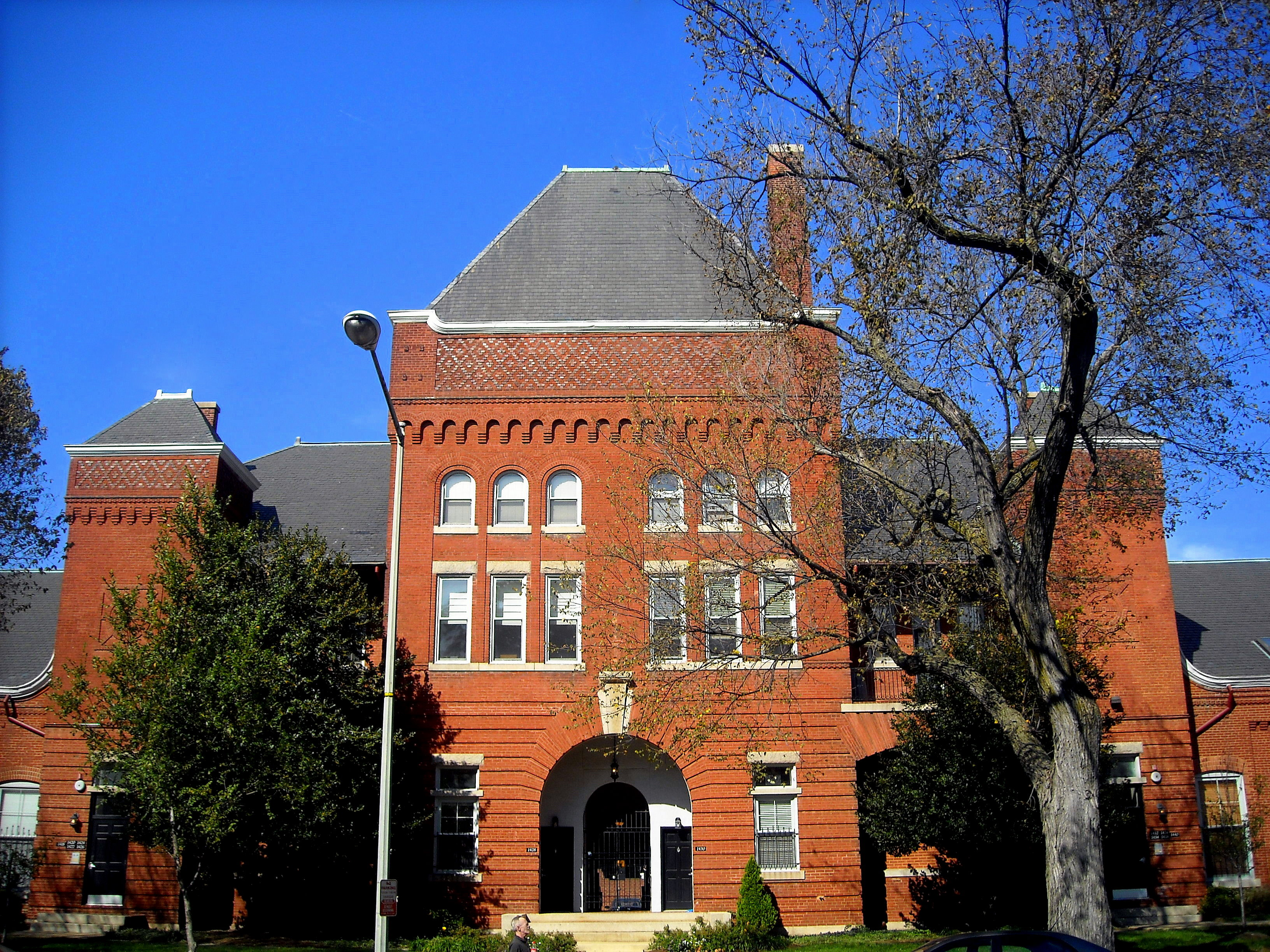

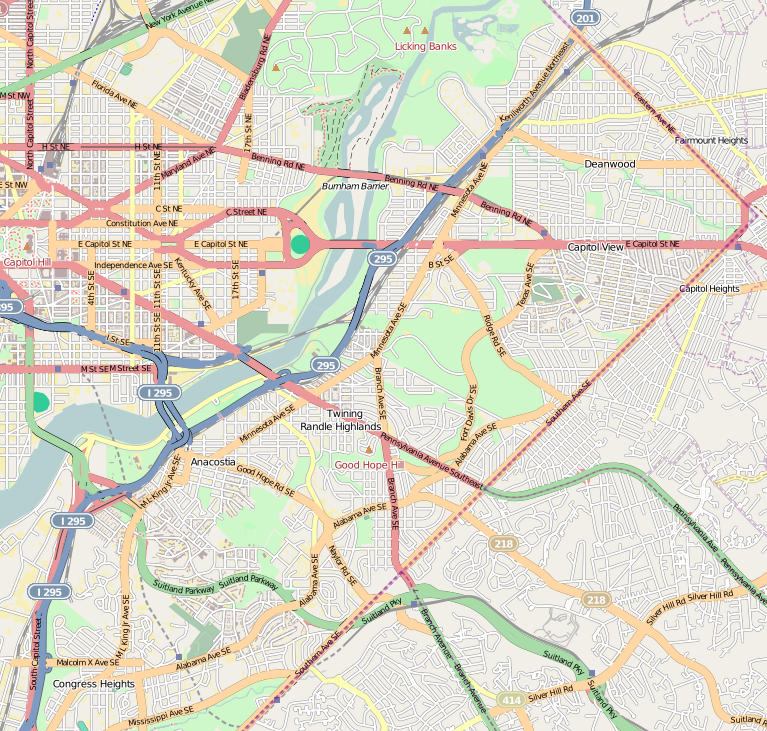
- Location within Washington, D.C. Location within the District of Columbia Location within the United States
- Location: 1400 East Capitol Street NE; Washington, D.C.
- Coordinates: 38°53′24.47″N 76°59′4.76″W
- Built: 1896
- Architectural style: Romanesque Revival
- NRHP reference No.: 74002158
- Added to NRHP: February 5, 1974

The East Capitol Car Barn, also known as The Car Barn Condominiums, is an historic building located on East Capitol Street in the Capitol Hill neighborhood of Washington, D.C.

== History ==
The Romanesque Revival building was designed by Waddy Butler Wood in 1896. It was built as a part of the conversion of Streetcars in Washington, D.C. to electric traction. In 1962, it was used to store buses. In 1973, the DC Transit Company was acquired by Washington Metropolitan Area Transit Authority, and the building was vacant. A private developer purchased the property and developed it into condominiums.

The building was added to the National Register of Historic Places on February 5, 1974.
