= Bachelor Apartment House =

- U.S. National Register of Historic Places
- D.C. Inventory of Historic Sites
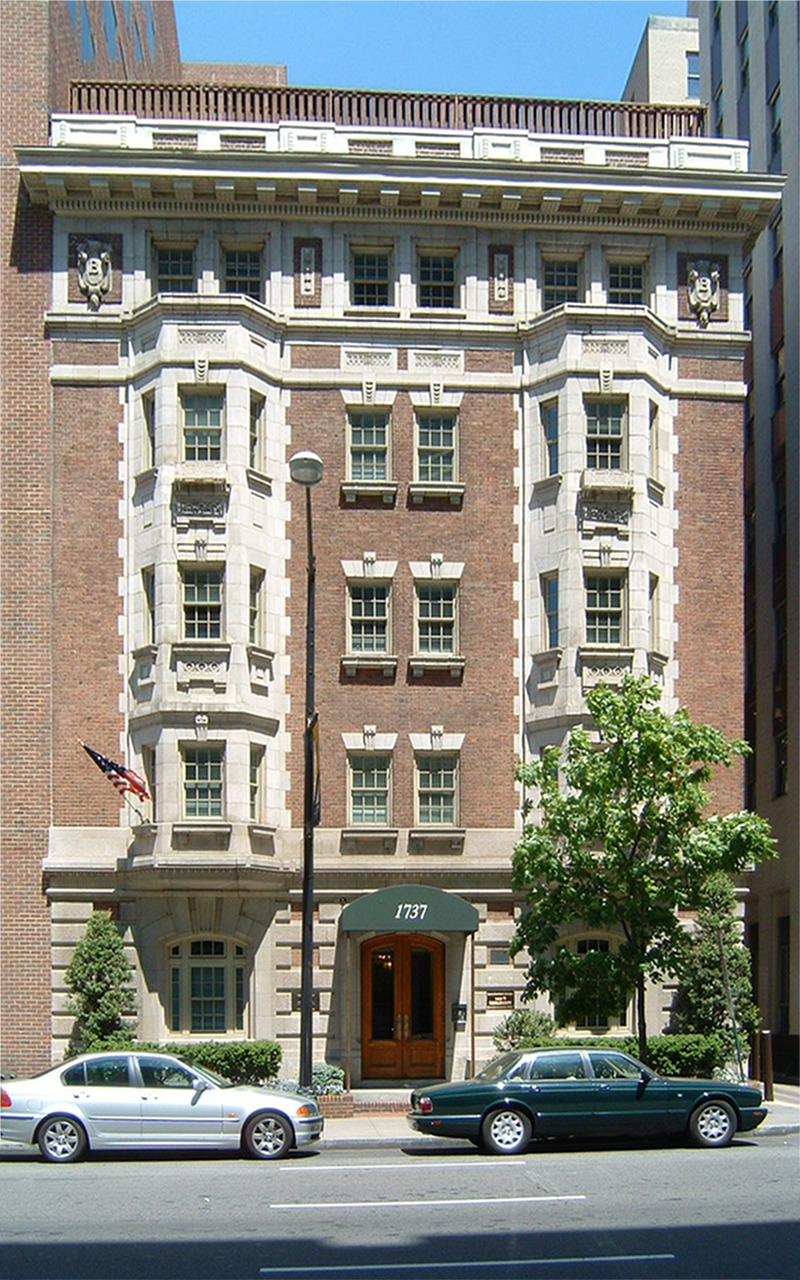

- Location within Washington, D.C.
- Location: 1737 H St., NW; Washington, D.C.
- Coordinates: 38°54′1.5″N 77°2′28.8″W
- Built: 1905
- Architect: Wood, Donn & Deming
- Architectural style: Tudor Revival
- MPS: Apartment Buildings in Washington, DC, MPS
- NRHP reference No.: 78003052

Significant dates
- Added to NRHP: December 8, 1978
- Designated DCIHS: November 2, 1977

The Bachelor Apartment House is an historic structure located in the Northwest Quadrant of Washington, D.C. The architectural firm of Wood, Donn & Deming designed the building.

It is believed to be the only example of a luxury apartment building built for single men still standing in the city. It is also one of the first apartment buildings in Washington with a Tudor Revival façade. The building, which now contains offices, was listed on the National Register of Historic Places in 1978.

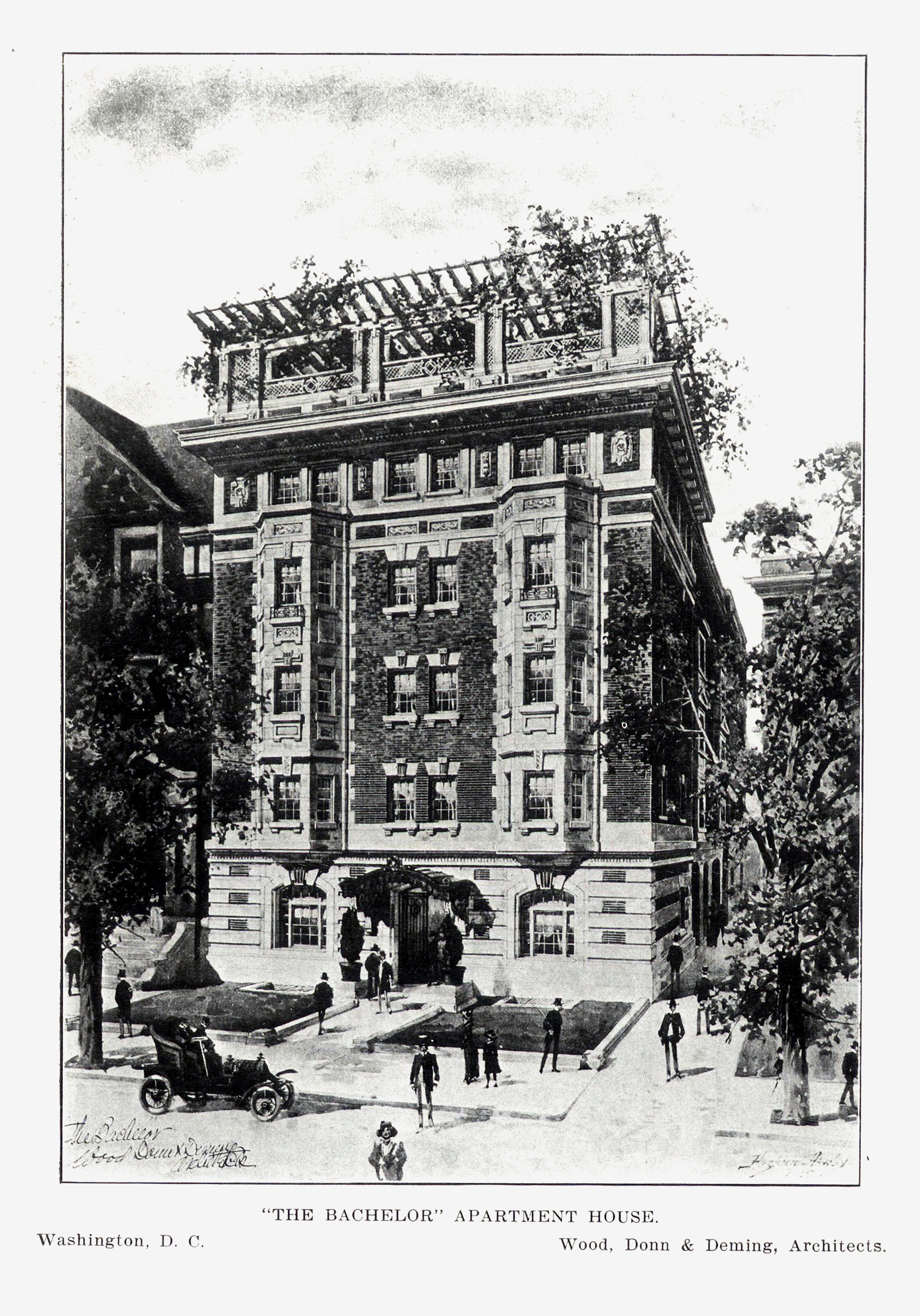
Drawing of the building

== Residents ==
- Hubbard Bowyer McDonald (1850–1907).
