= Kyle Long =

American football player (born 1988)

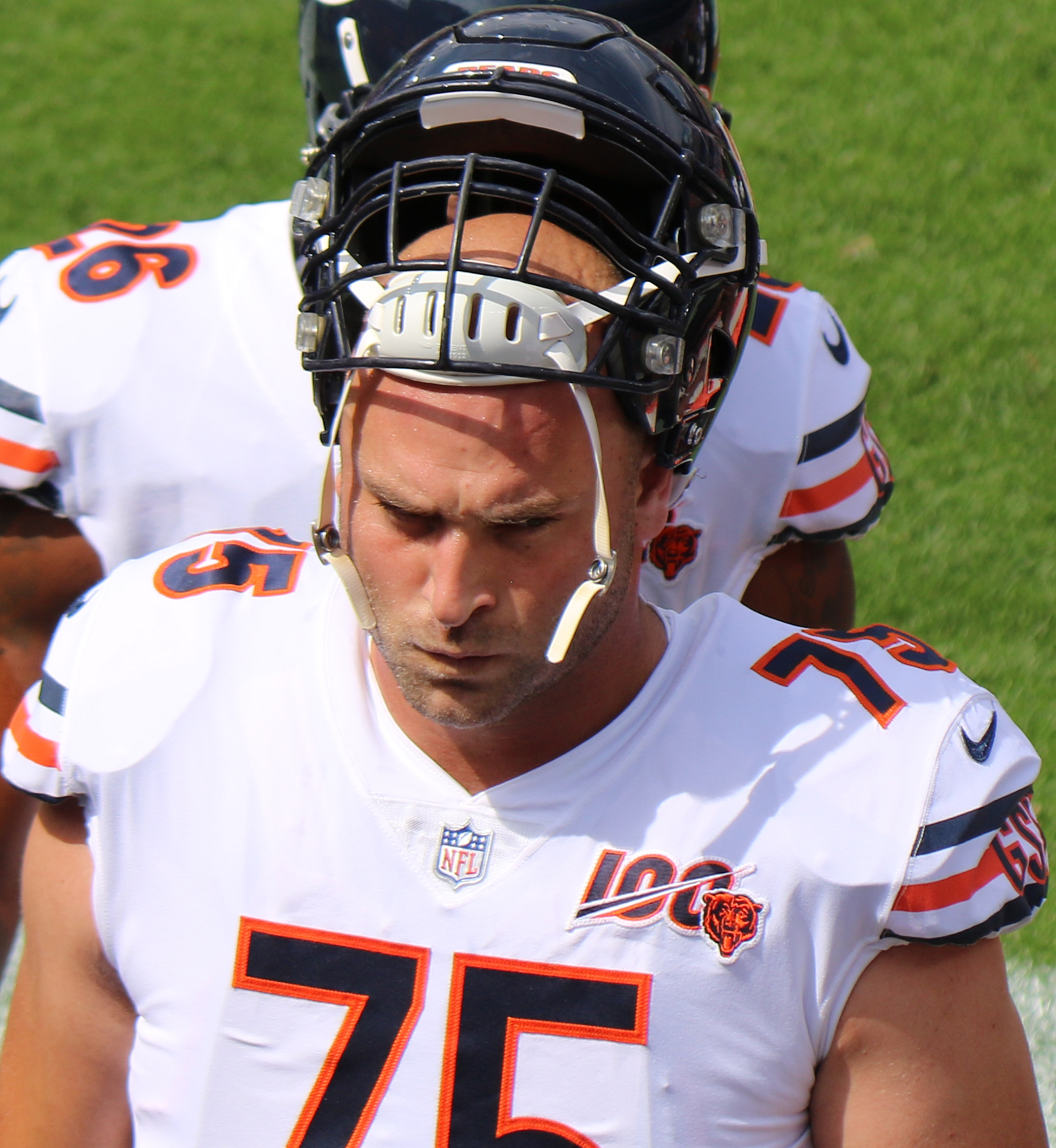
- Long with the Chicago Bears in 2019

No. 75
- Position: Guard

Personal information
- Born: December 5, 1988 (age 37); Ivy, Virginia, U.S.
- Listed height: 6 ft 6 in (1.98 m)
- Listed weight: 313 lb (142 kg)

Career information
- High school: St. Anne's-Belfield (Charlottesville, Virginia)
- College: Florida State (2008); Saddleback (2010–2011); Oregon (2012)
- NFL draft: 2013: 1st round, 20th overall pick

Career history
- Chicago Bears (2013–2019); Kansas City Chiefs (2021)

Awards and highlights
- Second-team All-Pro (2014); 3× Pro Bowl (2013–2015); PFWA All-Rookie Team (2013); 100 greatest Bears of All-Time

Career NFL statistics
- Games played: 77
- Games started: 76
- Stats at Pro Football Reference

Kyle Howard Long (born December 5, 1988) is an American former professional football guard who played in the National Football League (NFL) for seven seasons with the Chicago Bears. The son of Pro Football Hall of Fame defensive end Howie Long and the younger brother of former defensive end Chris Long, he played college football for the Oregon Ducks following a stint with the Florida State Seminoles. He was selected by the Bears in the first round of the 2013 NFL draft.

During his Bears tenure, Long was named to three consecutive Pro Bowls and one second-team All-Pro. After retiring in 2019, he returned with the Kansas City Chiefs for the 2021 season, but did not play with them due to injuries. Long was named among the 100 greatest Bears of All-Time in 2019.

Long currently works as a in-studio analyst for the NFL on CBS coverage.

== Early life ==
Long was born in Ivy, Virginia. He attended St. Anne's-Belfield School in Charlottesville, Virginia. He played both baseball and football. He was selected to the 2008 U.S. Army All-American Bowl. He was selected by the Chicago White Sox in the 23rd round of the 2008 Major League Baseball draft, but did not sign and honored his commitment to Florida State University.

== College career ==
In January 2009, Long left Florida State for academic reasons following an arrest for DWI. In 2010, Long enrolled at Saddleback College, a community college in Mission Viejo, California, and returned to playing football. During his first year he played defensive end, recording 16 tackles and one quarterback sack. In 2011, he switched to the offensive line. On December 18, 2011, he committed to play for the Oregon Ducks football team, and subsequently transferred to the University of Oregon. During the 2012 season, he started six of twelve games for the Ducks on the offensive line. He appealed for an extra year of college eligibility, but his appeal was denied by the NCAA. On March 9, 2024, Long was inducted into the California Community College Football Coaches Hall of Fame.

== Professional career ==
Pre-draft measurables
Height	Weight	Arm length	Hand span	Wingspan	40-yard dash	10-yard split	20-yard split	20-yard shuttle	Three-cone drill	Vertical jump	Broad jump
6 ft 6 1/8 in (1.98 m)	313 lb (142 kg)	33 3/8 in (0.85 m)	11 in (0.28 m)	6 ft 7 5/8 in (2.02 m)	4.94 s	1.74 s	2.87 s	4.63 s	7.83 s	28 in (0.71 m)	9 ft 2 in (2.79 m)
All values from NFL Scouting Combine/Pro Day

=== Chicago Bears ===
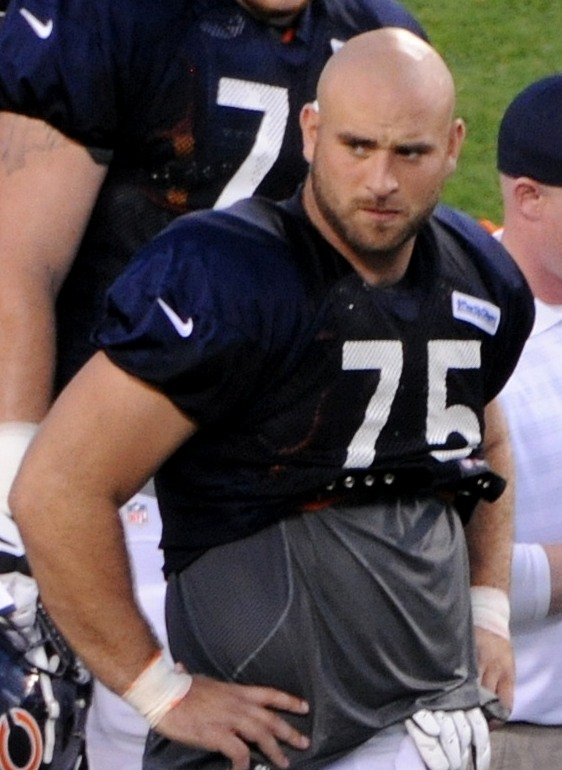
Long at Bears training camp in 2014

Long was selected by the Chicago Bears with the 20th overall pick in the 2013 NFL draft. He was the first guard to be drafted by the team in the first round since Roger Davis in 1960. Long signed on May 17, the last member of Chicago's 2013 draft class to do so.

Long attended the rookie minicamp from May 10–12, but missed much of the offseason program due to a league rule prohibiting rookies from working out until their college class graduates. He returned to team activities on June 17. Long started the 2013 season opener against the Cincinnati Bengals at right guard, becoming the first rookie in team history to start a season opener at the position in the Super Bowl era. On January 8, 2014, Long was named to Pro Football Focus' All-Rookie Team. He was subsequently named to NFL.com's All-Rookie Team on January 15. On January 20, 2014, he earned a spot in the 2014 Pro Bowl due to the injury of original Pro Bowl left guard Mike Iupati in the 2014 NFC Championship Game. Long became the first Bears rookie to make the Pro Bowl since Johnny Knox in 2009. He was named to the PFWA All-Rookie Team.

He made the Pro Bowl again following the 2014 season and was also named as a second-team All-Pro guard.

At the start of the 2015 season, Long made the switch from guard to tackle. He started all 16 regular season games in 2015 and was selected to his third consecutive Pro Bowl.

On March 10, 2016, the Bears signed right tackle Bobby Massie from the Arizona Cardinals, and Long was moved back to guard. On April 15, 2016, the Bears exercised the fifth-year option on Long's rookie deal, a move that would have kept Long under his original contract through 2017.

On September 7, 2016, Long signed a four-year $40 million contract extension with the Bears through 2021.

Long suffered multiple injuries during the 2016 season. He played the first seven games of the season with a torn labrum in his left shoulder. He missed the Bears' Week 8 contest against the Minnesota Vikings due to a strained triceps. Long then severely injured his right ankle two weeks later against the Tampa Bay Buccaneers and was carted off the field. He was placed on injured reserve on November 15.

On December 5, 2017, Long was placed on injured reserve after aggravating a shoulder injury in Week 13, while also being bothered by ankle and finger injuries throughout the season.

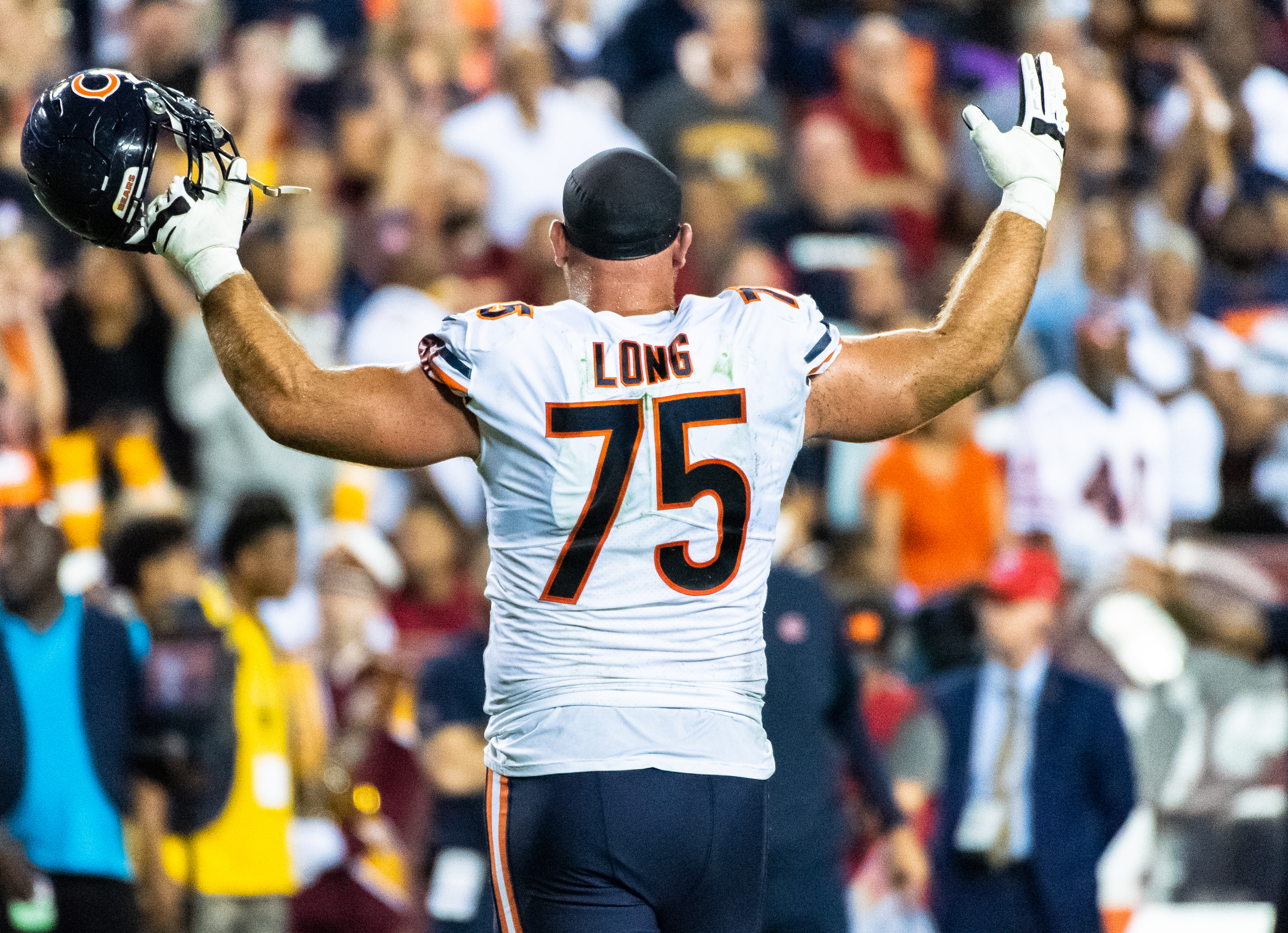
Long during his final season with the Bears

Long started the first eight games of the 2018 season, but suffered a foot injury in Week 8 against the New York Jets and was ruled out 6–8 weeks just a few days later. He was placed on injured reserve on November 3, 2018. He was activated off injured reserve on December 29, 2018.

Early in 2019, Long suffered a hip injury that forced him to miss the Week 4 game against the Minnesota Vikings. Although he returned for the following week's Oakland Raiders game, the injury persisted and he was placed on injured reserve on October 14.

Long announced his retirement from professional football on January 6, 2020. The Bears declined his contract option for 2020, making him an unrestricted free agent on March 18, 2020.

=== Kansas City Chiefs ===
On March 18, 2021, Long signed with the Kansas City Chiefs, after deciding to come out of retirement. He injured his knee during OTAs on June 10. Long was placed on the physically unable to perform list (PUP) on August 31, due to the injury. He was activated on November 30. Long was put on the Reserve/COVID-19 list on December 21. He was activated on December 27. Long did not play a single snap for the Chiefs, largely due to his knee injury and the emergence of rookie guard Trey Smith.

== Broadcasting career ==
Long joined CBS Sports in 2020 as an NFL analyst before signing with the Chiefs in 2021. After his retirement he returned to CBS and Paramount+ to host The NFL Today+.

== Personal life ==
Long is the son of Pro Football Hall of Fame defensive end Howie Long and the younger brother of retired defensive end Chris Long.

He is a part-owner of esports team Mode Motorsports in the eNASCAR Coca-Cola iRacing Series, and as of September 16, 2020, co-hosts (with Paul Swan) a weekly talk show on NASCAR.com's YouTube channel. In 2020, Long became a studio analyst for CBS Sports Network's That Other Pregame Show.
