= D. S. Tavern =

Historic commercial building in Virginia, United States

- D.S. Tavern
- U.S. National Register of Historic Places
- Virginia Landmarks Register
- Drawing of the facade

- Location within Virginia Location within the United States
- Location: US 250, Ivy, Virginia
- Coordinates: 38°3′12″N 78°34′3″W
- Area: 2 acres (0.81 ha)
- Architectural style: "I" House
- NRHP reference No.: 83003255
- VLR No.: 002-0231

Significant dates
- Added to NRHP: September 29, 1983
- Designated VLR: August 16, 1983

D. S. Tavern, also known as the 1740 House, is a historic tavern located at Ivy, Albemarle County, Virginia. The building dates to the late 18th to early 19th century. It is a two-story, single pile, log and frame I-house, covered in beaded weatherboards. It sits on a brick and rubblestone foundation and has a gable roof pierced by two brick chimneys. It has an early-19th-century, one-story kitchen connected by a hyphen. From 1785 to about 1850, the tavern served the westward movement of settlers along the turnpike running from Richmond to the Valley. The tavern was owned by Chief Justice John Marshall, who maintained the property from 1810 to 1813. In the mid- to late 19th century, it was converted to a private residence.

It was added to the National Register of Historic Places in 1983.
