= Providence Park (Washington, D.C.) =

Park in Washington, D.C., United States

- Interactive map of Providence Park
- Location: Washington, D.C.
- Coordinates: 38°53′01″N 77°00′10″W
- Area: 2.4 acres (0.97 ha)

Providence Park, known locally as X Park, is a 2.4-acre (0.97 ha) urban park in the residential Capitol Hill neighborhood in Southeast Washington, D.C. It is bound by 2nd, 3rd, D and E streets SE. It is owned and maintained by the Architect of the Capitol, the real estate office for Congress, as part of the United States Capitol Complex.

The park is named for Providence Hospital, a Catholic hospital which occupied the square from 1866 until it moved to the Brookland neighborhood in Northeast in 1956.

Providence Park features simple landscaping. It is flat and mostly covered with manicured grass, with some trees of different sizes, sidewalks and diagonal paved paths that make an "X" shape. It also has some benches and a plaque commemorating the hospital. Across D Street is Folger Park, a National Park Service site; apart from the street, they make for a contiguous park of more than 4 acres.

It was established as a park in 1978. But a variety of development projects have been proposed for the site in the decades since Providence moved, including housing, schools, a parking lot and a dormitory for congressional pages, all of which were defeated by neighborhood pressure, city officials or Congress.

== History ==
Providence Hospital was founded in 1861. It moved to what is now the park in 1866, and by 1872, occupied the whole block. It moved to Brookland in 1956. The Daughters of Charity of Saint Vincent de Paul, which owned the hospital, retained ownership of the Capitol Hill site and leased the buildings to the federal government's General Services Administration. GSA used the buildings as temporary office space for various agencies including the State Department and Commerce Department.

In 1962, the Daughters of Charity sold the site to a group of developers, including local parking industry mogul Dominic F. Antonelli Jr. and Republican businessman Kingdon Gould Jr., for $650,000. They continued to lease it to the federal government. Throughout the ensuing decade, the developers and Congress (which considered buying the block from the private owners) floated a variety of proposals for the site, including a 10-story apartment building, a parking lot, a headquarters building or training center for the Metropolitan Police Department, a public school and a nine-story commercial office building.

All ideas faced opposition from local residents and were blocked by city officials or Congress. Meanwhile, the buildings were condemned in 1965, after GSA ended its lease, and torn down. But the piles of dirt, without a fence, had become a nuisance and had attracted pests.

In 1972, Congress voted to buy the plot of land from the private owners. It paid $1.4 million, and planned to build a dormitory for congressional pages, who had until then been required to find their own housing during their time working for Congress.

Congress never appropriated the funds to build the dormitory at the Providence site, so the plans languished, and it stayed a dirt pile, despite the 1972 legislation mandating that the site be maintained as a park until the dormitory is built. In 1977, the House proposed to turn the block into a parking lot for staff and visitors at a cost of $483,000, despite strong neighborhood opposition. That plan did not pass, but the next year, Congress, under significant neighborhood pressure, appropriated $375,000 to clean up the site and landscape it as a park. The park has changed little since 1978, but Congress and city officials did not give up on development plans.

A coalition of local churches in 1980 proposed to build a 162-unit subsidized housing complex for senior citizens. The University of California system eyed the park in 1990 for a teaching and research center that would also house 240 students. Neither proposal was approved.

Neighbors mobilized again in 2007 amid rumors that the Architect of the Capitol would use part of the park to stage equipment for utility tunnel construction work, a rumor officials denied.
