= Home Tract =

Historic house in Virginia, United States

- U.S. National Register of Historic Places
- Virginia Landmarks Register
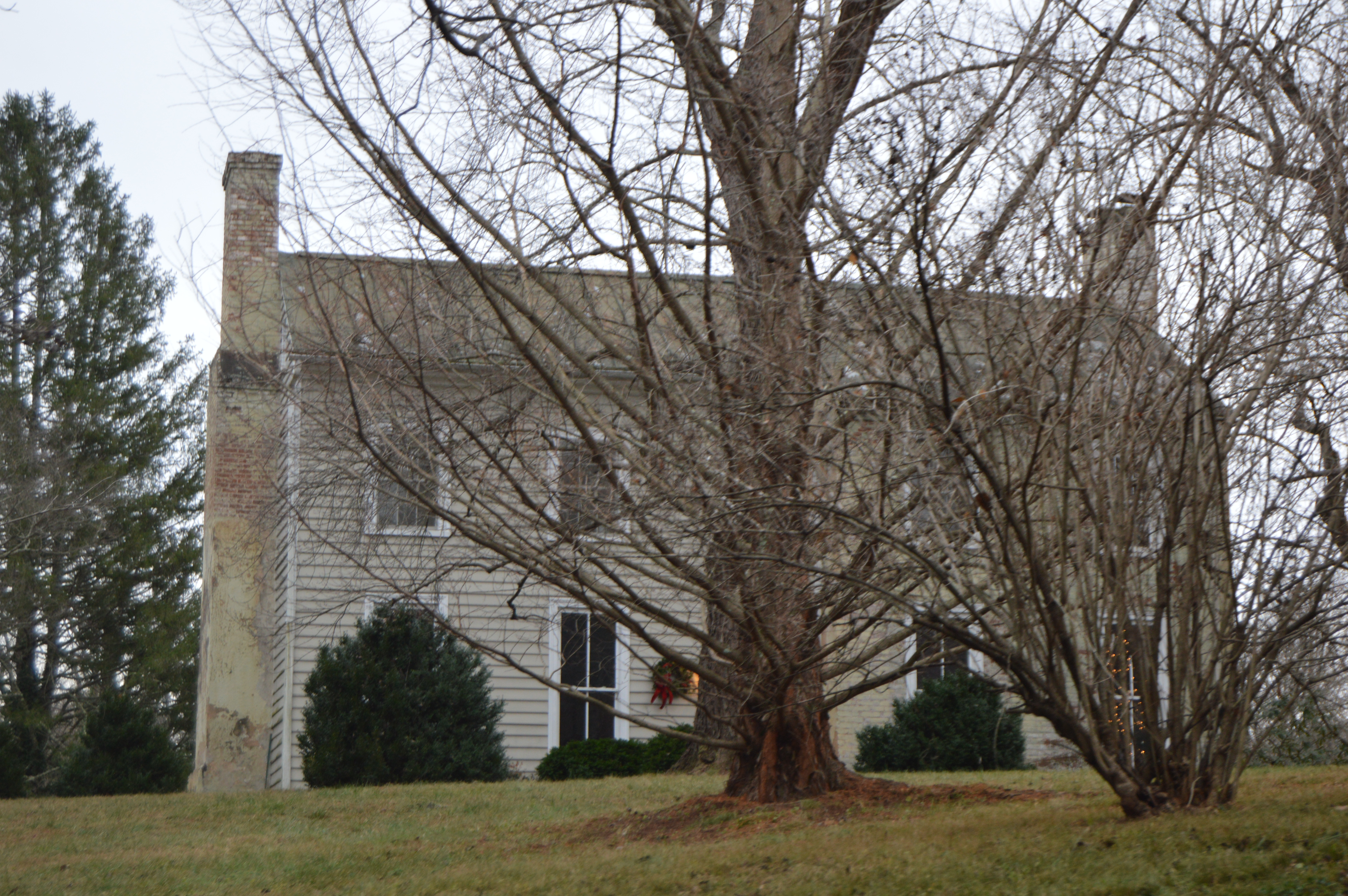
- Front of the house

- Location within Virginia Location within the United States
- Location: 699 Ivy Depot Rd., Ivy, Virginia
- Coordinates: 38°3′20″N 78°35′54″W
- Area: 3 acres (1.2 ha)
- Built: c. 1840, 1920
- Architectural style: Georgian, Greek Revival
- NRHP reference No.: 99001501
- VLR No.: 002-0283

Significant dates
- Added to NRHP: December 9, 1999
- Designated VLR: September 15, 1999

Home Tract, also known as Woodville, is a historic home located at Ivy, Albemarle County, Virginia. The main house consists of a 2½-story, hall-parlor-plan frame dwelling with a two-story brick addition. A frame rear ell was added to the brick section about 1920. The interiors feature late Georgian and Greek Revival-style detailing. Also on the property is "The Cottage," one-story frame building with a stucco exterior, a metal-sheathed gable roof, and a Victorian front porch; a meathouse, and wellhouse.

It was added to the National Register of Historic Places in 1999.
