= Ivy, Virginia =

Ivy
- Census-designated place (CDP)
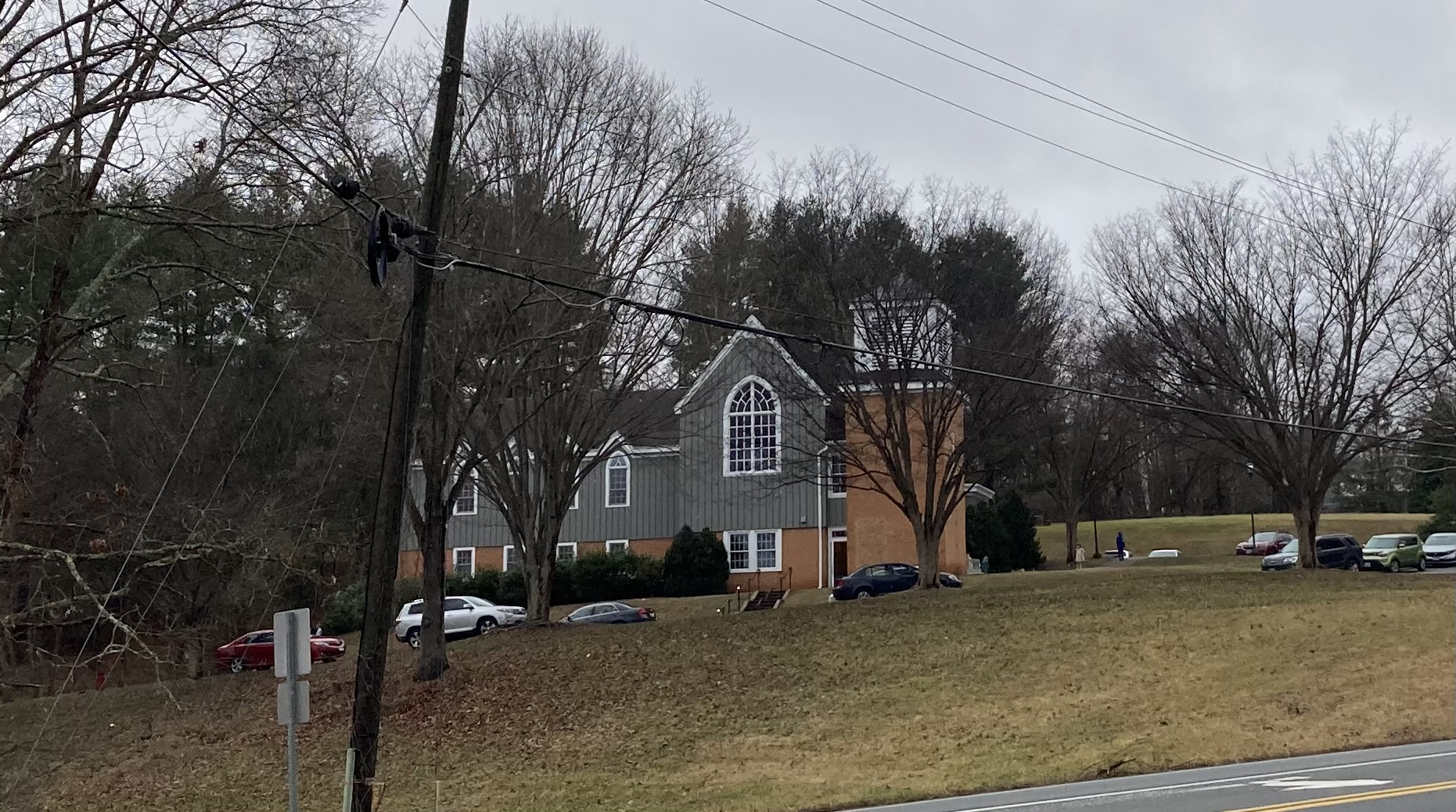

- Location of Ivy within Albemarle County

- Location within the Commonwealth of Virginia
- Coordinates: 38°03′23″N 78°35′48″W
- Country: United States
- State: Virginia
- County: Albemarle
- Elevation: 522 ft (159 m)

Population (2020)
  - Total: 917
- Time zone: UTC−5 (Eastern (EST))
  - Summer (DST): UTC−4 (EDT)
- Area code: 434
- GNIS feature ID: 1493130

Ivy is a census-designated place (CDP) in Albemarle County, Virginia, United States. As of the 2020 census, Ivy had a population of 917. It is a small unincorporated community located on U.S. Route 250, just west of Charlottesville.

D. S. Tavern, Home Tract, Spring Hill, Woodstock Hall Tavern and Blue Ridge Swim Club are listed on the National Register of Historic Places.

== History ==
Ivy Creek flows through this area of western Albemarle County. It was cited in deeds for land in the Ivy area as early as the 1750s. The village at the present location of Ivy was known as Woodville (for the locally prominent Wood family) between 1826 and 1851. After the arrival of the railroad in 1851, the rail stop at this location was known as Woodville Depot. By 1859, the name had changed to Ivy Depot, probably after Ivy Creek. The village's name was shortened to Ivy in the 1950s.

== Climate ==
The climate is characterized by relatively high temperatures and evenly distributed precipitation throughout the year. The Köppen Climate Classification subtype for this climate is "Cfa" (Humid Subtropical Climate).

== Demographics ==
Historical population
Census	Pop.	Note	%±
2020	917		—
U.S. Decennial Census; 2010 2020

Ivy was first listed as a census designated place in the 2010 U.S. census.

== Notable people ==
- Joe Hicks (1932–2023), former Major League Baseball player, born in Ivy
- Meriwether Lewis (1774–1809), politician, explorer part of Lewis & Clark
- Kyle Long (born 1988) professional football player for Chicago Bears
- Tom Perriello (born 1974), attorney, politician
- Virginia Hargraves Wood (c. 1872–1941), painter and illustrator
- Waddy Butler Wood (1869–1944), architect
