= Hubbard Bowyer McDonald =

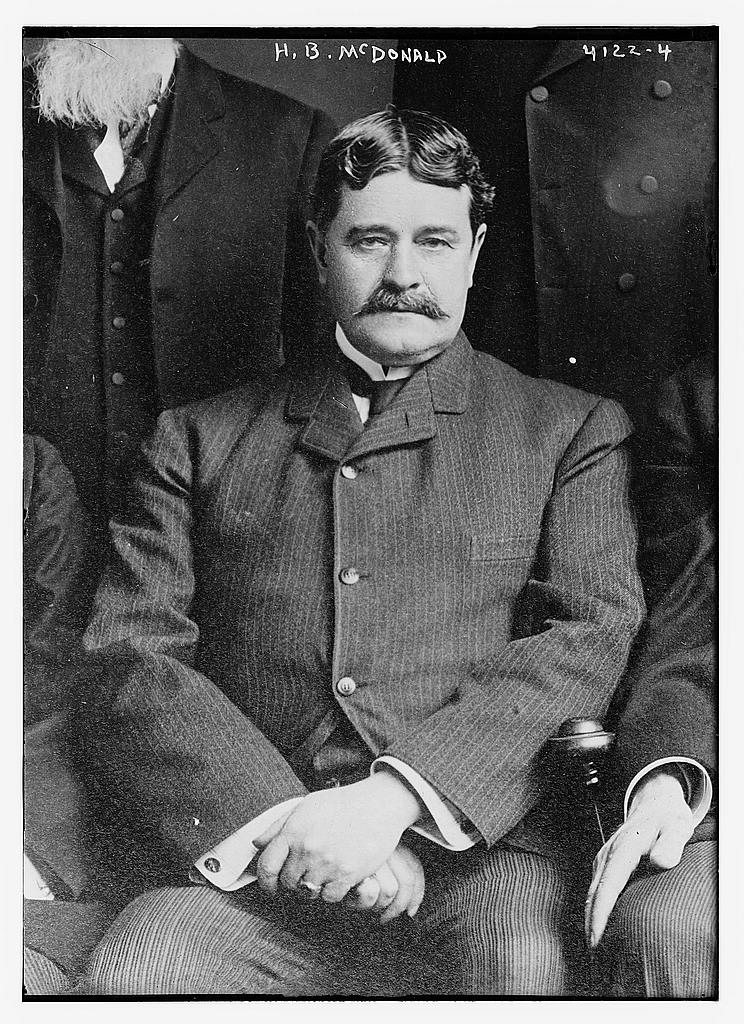
Hubbard Bowyer McDonald circa 1907

Hubbard Bowyer McDonald (March 4, 1850 - March 2, 1907) was chief clerk to the Secretary of the United States Senate and Parliamentarian of the United States Senate.

== Biography ==
He was born on March 4, 1850, in Washington, D.C., to William J. McDonald and Ann Belle Holt.

He died on March 2, 1907, of liver cancer at the Bachelor Apartment House in Washington, D.C.
