= Ellwood (Leesburg, Virginia) =

Historic house in Virginia, United States

- U.S. National Register of Historic Places
- Virginia Landmarks Register
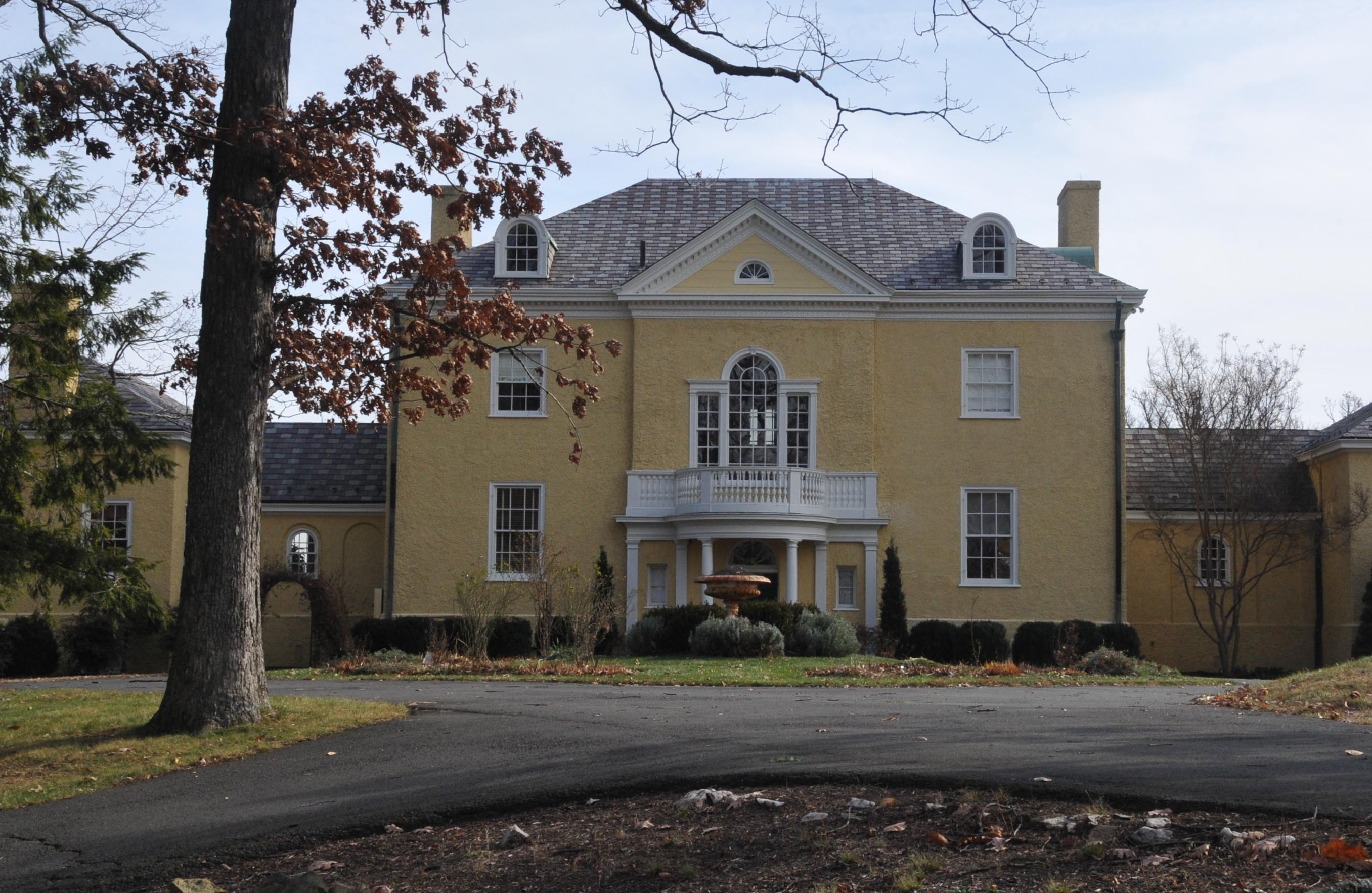

- Location within Northern Virginia Location within Virginia Location within the United States
- Location: 17360 Count Turf Place, Leesburg, Virginia
- Coordinates: 39°8′11″N 77°35′16″W
- Area: 10 acres (4.0 ha)
- Built: 1911
- Built by: Kimmel, W.M.
- Architect: Wood, Waddy Butler
- Architectural style: Colonial Revival
- NRHP reference No.: 04000054
- VLR No.: 053-0639

Significant dates
- Added to NRHP: February 11, 2004
- Designated VLR: October 3, 2003

Ellwood, also known as Leeland and the Lawrence Lee House, is a historic home located near Leesburg, Loudoun County, Virginia. It was designed by architect Waddy Butler Wood (1869–1944) and built in 1911–1912. It is a 2 1/2-story, Colonial Revival style mansion with a five-part symmetrical plan consisting of a main block with a hipped slate roof connected by hyphens to one- story wings with hipped slate roofs. The house sits on a rise just above the American Civil War fort, Fort Johnston, which at one time was part of the estate. The house was designed for Lawrence Rust Lee, who was related to the prominent Rust and Lee families of Leesburg. Also on the property are the contributing garage and wood / meat house. In the 1980s it was home to Lyndon LaRouche, who named it "Ibykus Farm" after a work by Friedrich Schiller.

It was listed on the National Register of Historic Places in 2004.
