= Spring Hill (Ivy, Virginia) =

Historic house in Virginia, United States

- U.S. National Register of Historic Places
- Virginia Landmarks Register
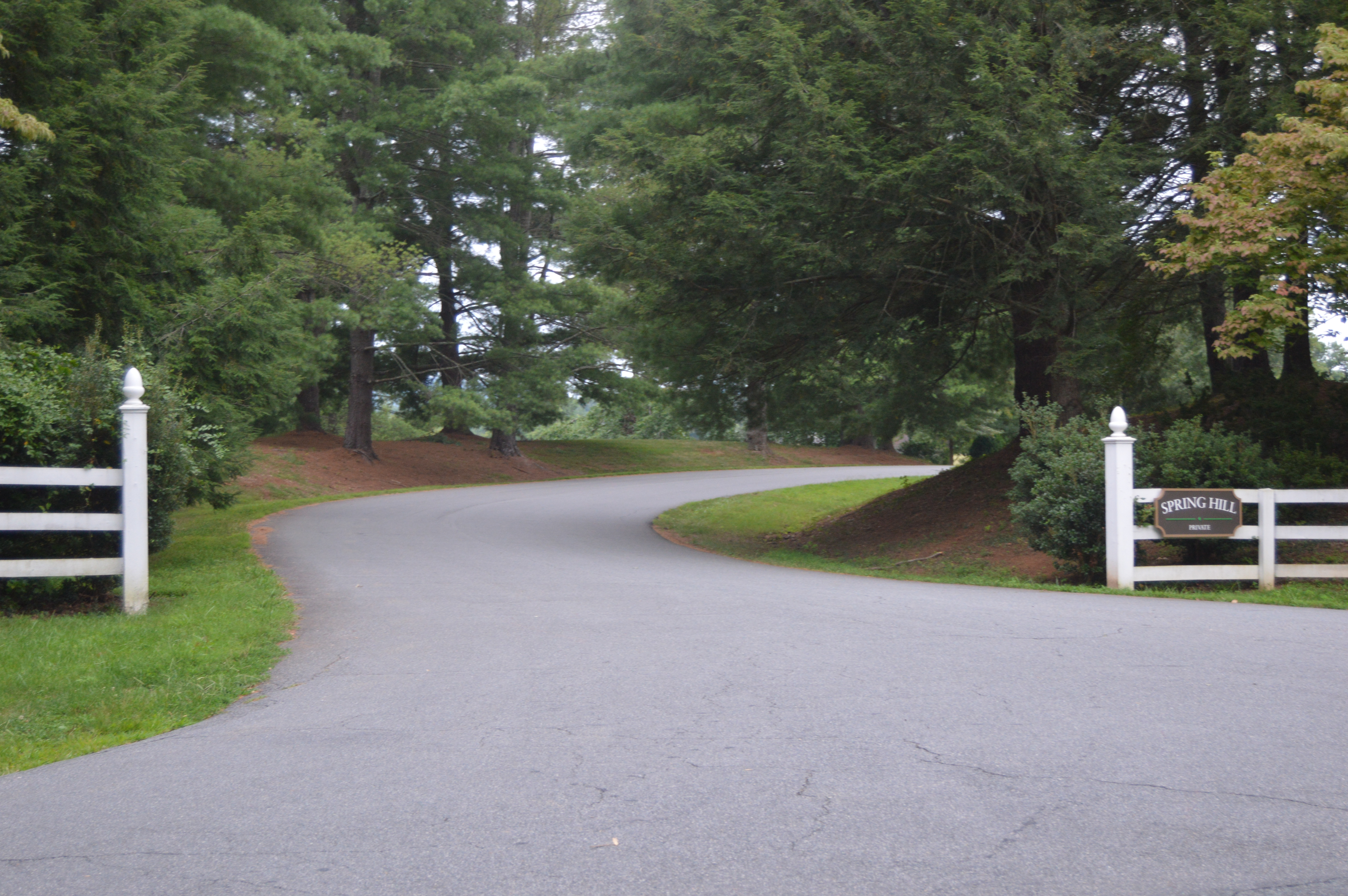
- Entrance to the property

- Location within Virginia Location within the United States
- Location: VA 637 and VA 786, Ivy, Virginia, U.S.
- Coordinates: 38°2′53″N 78°34′3″W
- Area: 10.8 acres (4.4 ha)
- Built: c. 1765, c. 1785
- NRHP reference No.: 83004232
- VLR No.: 002-0140

Significant dates
- Added to NRHP: November 21, 1983
- Designated VLR: August 16, 1983

Spring Hill is a historic home located at Ivy, Albemarle County, Virginia, U.S.. It was added to the National Register of Historic Places in 1983.

== Architecture ==
The main house dates to about 1785, and is a two-story, brick dwelling expanded in the 1870s and 1930s. The oldest building on the property is the brick field slave quarters, built about 1765, and once served as the main house. Also on the property are a brick dairy and kitchen. The house is representative of the evolution and integration of academic and vernacular architectural styles covering over two centuries of Albemarle County settlement.

== History ==
The Spring Hill property was part of a tract of land owned in 1735 by Charles Hudson, and sold two years later to Michael Woods (1737–1748). Woods lived further west at the foot of Woods' Gap (now Jarman Gap), the site may have been lived by his son-in-law Andrew Wallace, when it was sold in 1748 with 400 acres (160 ha) by Woods.

Spring Hill was also the childhood home of noted architect Waddy Butler Wood (1869–1944), and his sister, visual artist Virginia Hargraves Wood (1872–1941).
