= Virginia Hargraves Wood =

American painter (c. 1872–1941)

- Born: c. 1872 – c. 1873; Missouri, United States
- Died: February 24, 1941 (aged 68–69) near Ivy in Ablemarle County, Virginia, United States
- Burial place: Saint Paul's Cemetery, Ivy, Virginia, United States
- Other names: Virginia Hargraves Wood Goddard, Virginia Wood
- Education: Chase School of Art
- Occupation(s): Visual artist, illustrator, printmaker, teacher
- Known for: Paintings, drawings, portraits, engravings, book illustrations
- Movement: Peconic Bay Impressionism
- Spouse: Charles Franc Goddard (m. 1930–1941; death)
- Relatives: Waddy Butler Wood (brother)

Virginia Hargraves Wood (married name: Virginia Hargraves Wood Goddard; c. 1872 – February 24, 1941) was an American painter, printmaker, illustrator, and teacher. She is best known for her painted portraits of women and children, and numerous book illustrations. Wood was one of the founder members of the Virginia Fine Arts Society in Alexandria.

== Early life and family ==
Virginia Hargraves Wood was born c. 1872 in Missouri, United States, to parents Clara Forsyth Hargraves and lawyer-turned-Confederate States Army Cpt. Charles E. Wood. She had eight siblings, including noted architect Waddy Butler Wood.

In 1930, she married lawyer Charles F. Goddard (1862–1954) in New York City. After marriage she primarily used her maiden name for her art career. However her niece (and Waddy's daughter) was also named Virginia Hargraves Wood at birth (her married name was Virginia Wood Riggs; 1906–?), also worked as a painter, and worked for the Works Progress Administration (WPA) post office mural project in Pennsylvania.

== Career ==
Wood attended classes in New York City, and Paris; and studied under artists John Singer Sargent, Charles Webster Hawthorne, Frank DuMond, and William Merritt Chase at the Chase School of Art (now Parsons School of Design).

While studying in Paris, she visited a friend in London and became in-demand for her portrait work. Sitters for her portraits included Lady Anglesey, various works for the Seth Barton French family, and portraits of the four daughters of George Jay Gould. Wood also painted a noted portrait of Gertrude Stein in her older age.

She maintained an art studio in New York City. Wood also worked at Hawthorne's Cape Cod School of Art in Provincetown; and was a frequent guest at the Caroline M. Bell studio school in Mattituck in Long Island, New York. She was a member of the American Federation of Arts (AFA).

== Death and legacy ==
In her later life she moved to Mattituck. She died after an extended illness on February 24, 1941, while staying at her sister-in-laws house (and her childhood home) at Spring Hill in Ablemarle County near Ivy, Virginia.
