= Blue Ridge Swim Club =

- U.S. National Register of Historic Places
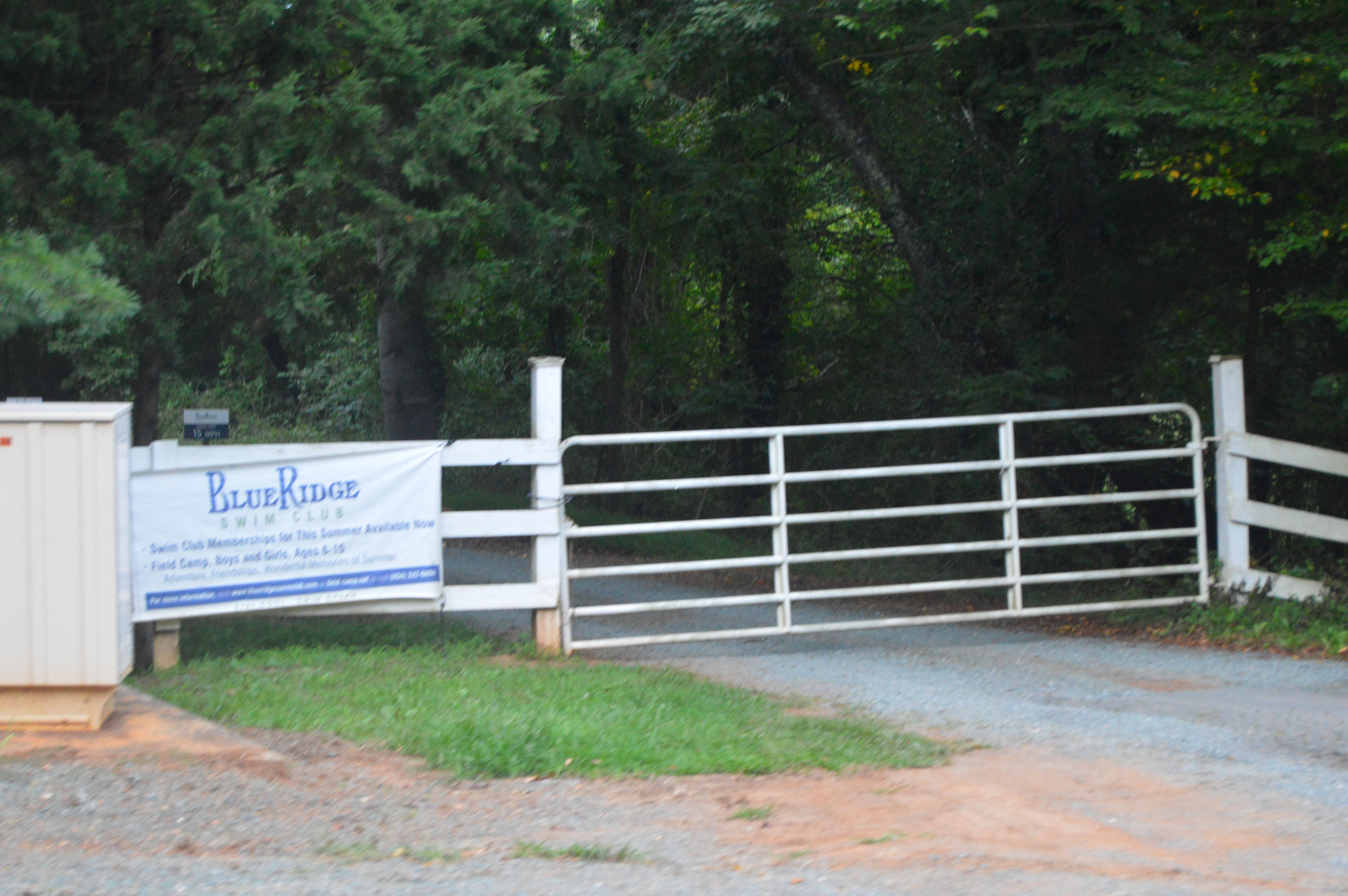
- Property entrance

- Location within Virginia Location within the United States
- Location: 1275 Owensville Rd., Ivy, Virginia
- Coordinates: 38°4′22″N 78°35′23″W
- Area: 12.1 acres (4.9 ha)
- NRHP reference No.: 15000248
- Added to NRHP: May 19, 2015

The Blue Ridge Swim Club is a historic swimming club facility at 1275 Owensville Road in Ivy, Virginia. The property includes a swimming pool that was built in 1913, when the area was developed as part of the Blue Ridge Camp for boys. The concrete pool is 100 yards (91 m) long and 10 yards (9.1 m) wide, with a sloping floor ranging in depth from 30 inches (0.76 m) to 10 feet (3.0 m). The pool's water is supplied from Ivy Brook via a gravity feed system. The pool is one of the oldest outdoor recreational facilities in the state.

The property was listed on the National Register of Historic Places in 2015, primarily for the significance of its swimming pool.

== See also ==
- National Register of Historic Places listings in Albemarle County, Virginia
