= Providence Hospital (Washington, D.C.) =

Coordinates: 38.944°N 76.991°W

- Ascension Health
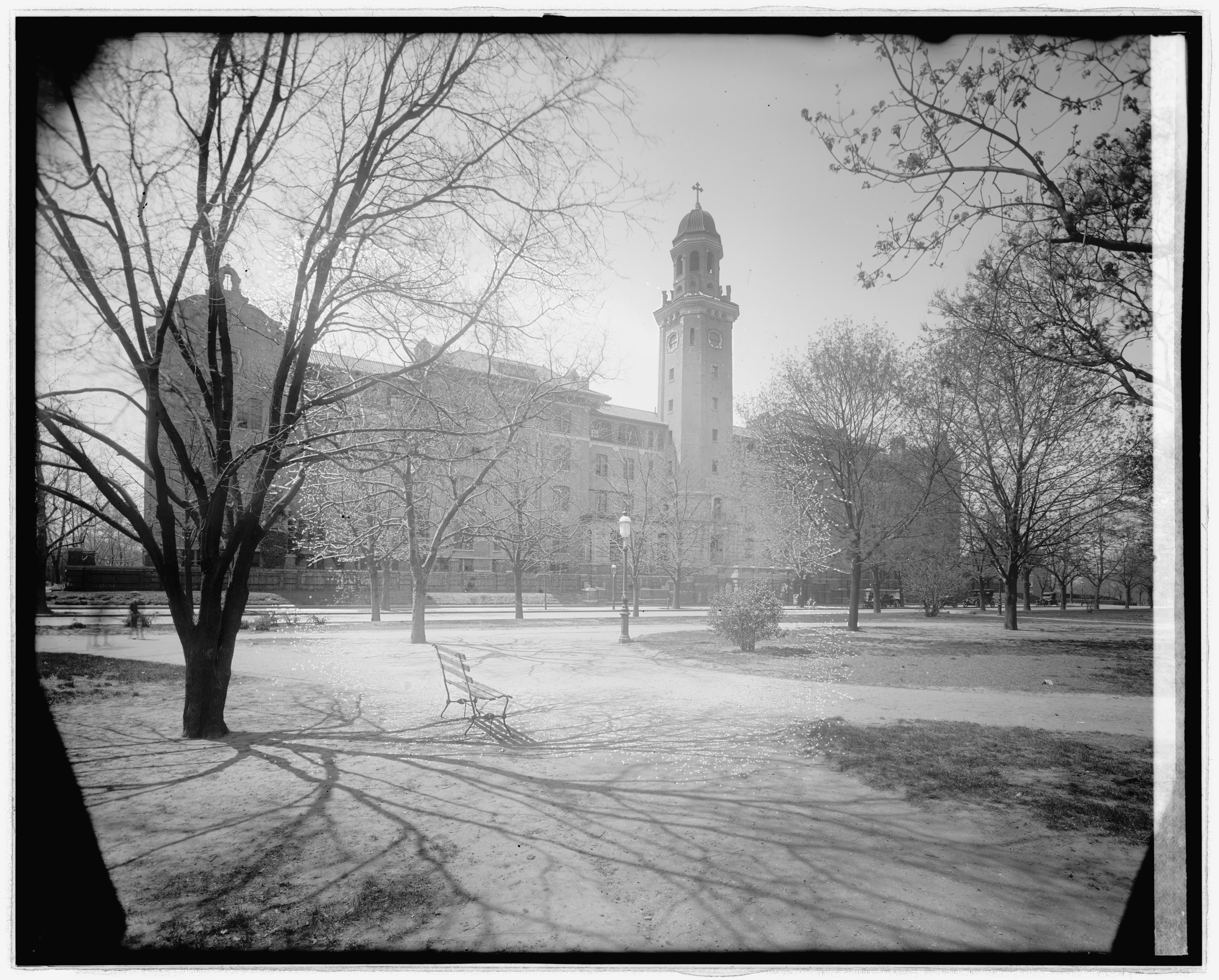
- Photo ca 1910-1926

Geography
- Location: 1150 Varnum Street, NE, Washington, D.C., United States

Organization
- Care system: Private not-for-profit
- Type: Teaching

Services
- Beds: 408

History
- Founded: 1861
- Closed: 2019

Links
- Website: "Providence Health System". Archived from the original on November 12, 2019.
- Lists: Hospitals in Washington, D.C.

Providence Hospital was a 408-bed hospital located in the District of Columbia, United States. Founded in 1861 on Capitol Hill by the Roman Catholic Daughters of Charity of Saint Vincent de Paul, it was the longest continuously operating hospital and the last public hospital in the District. It moved to Brookland in 1956. Providence Hospital was a member of Ascension Health, the largest non-profit health care organization in the United States.

The hospital's former site on Capitol Hill is now Providence Park, a public park established in 1978. It has been eyed for numerous developments over the years, including as an apartment building, congressional page dormitory and parking lot.

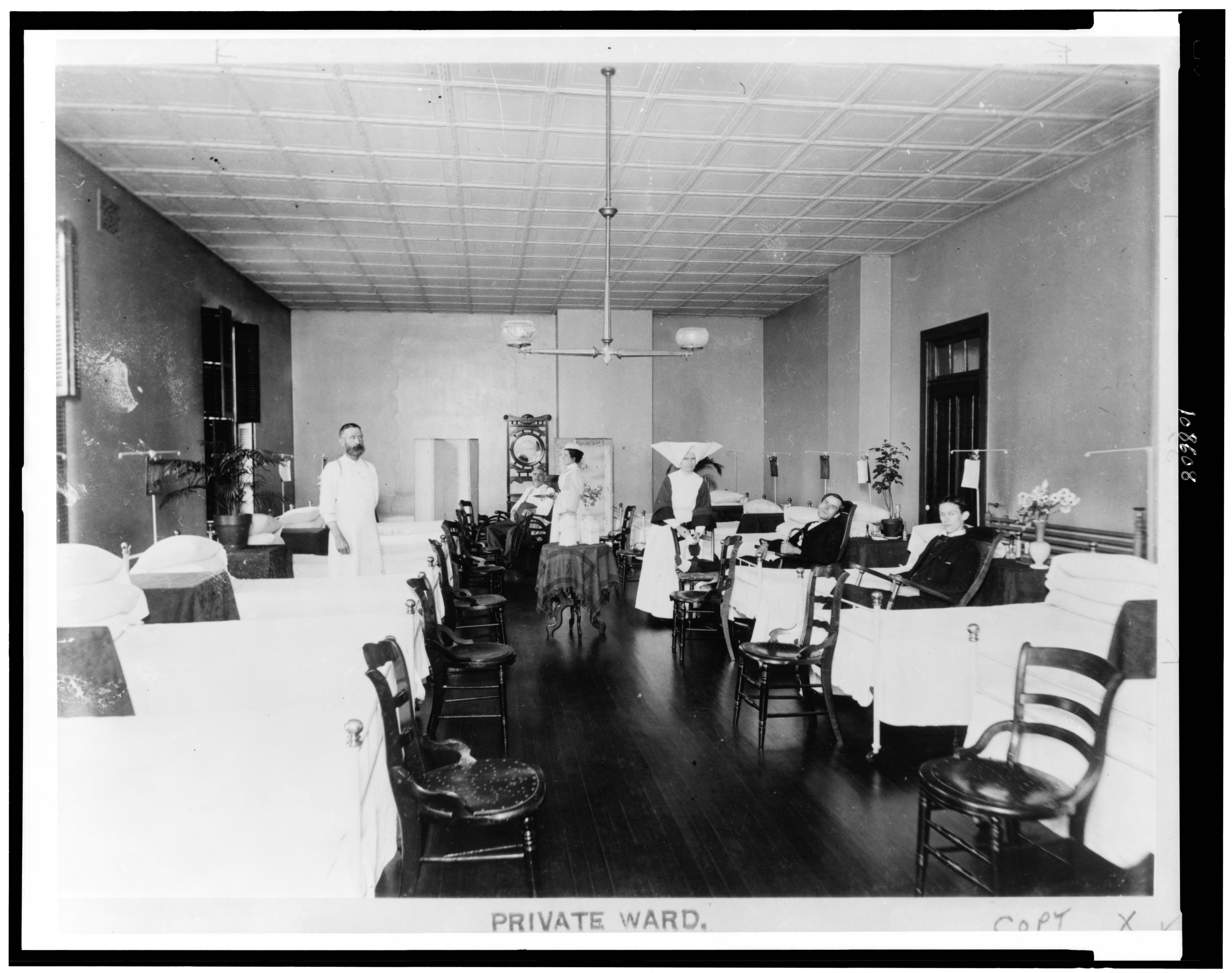
Private ward in Providence Hospital

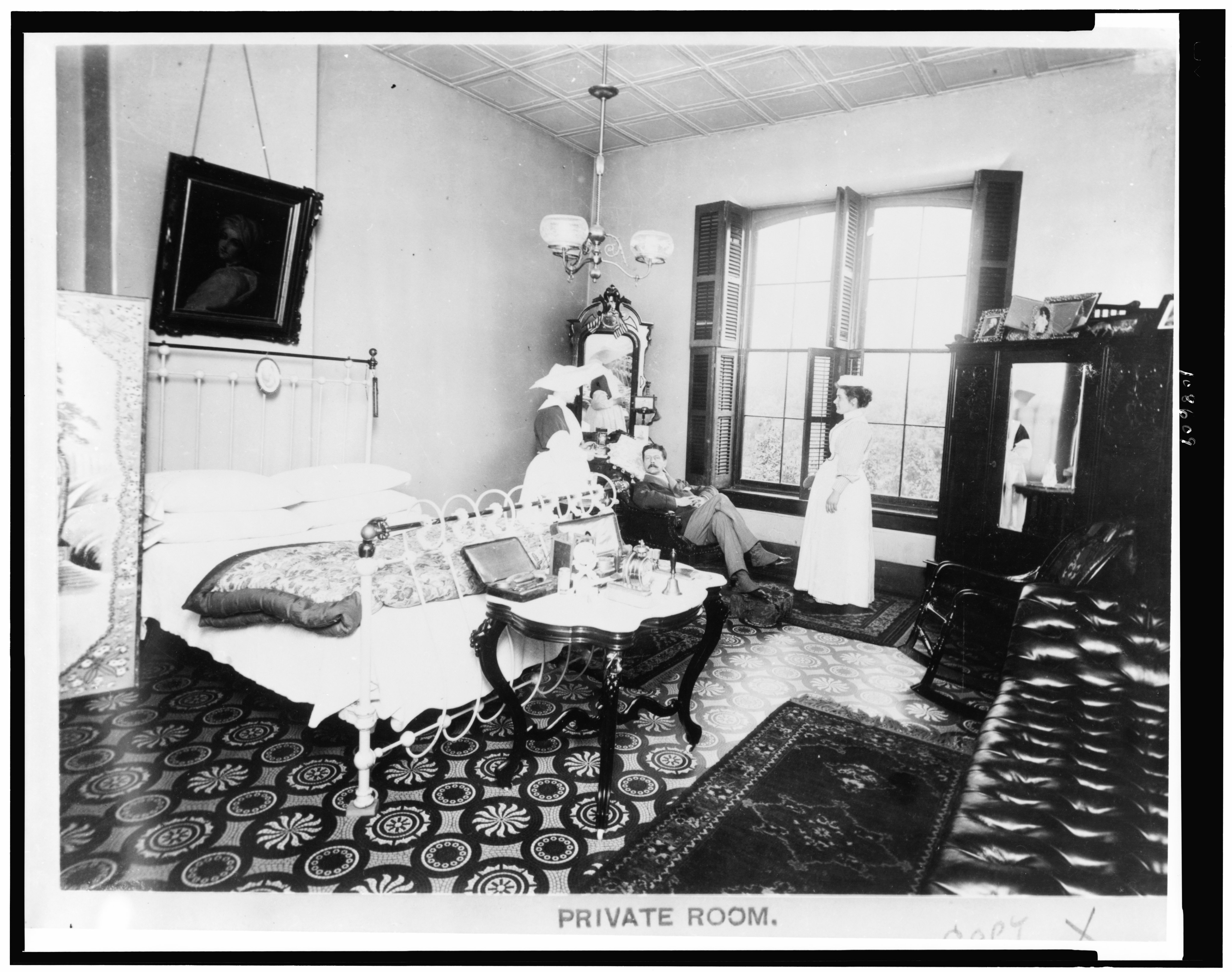
Private room in Providence Hospital

== Description ==
Providence Health System consisted of Providence Hospital (the main hospital), as well as several offsite clinics and healthcare facilities: Carroll Manor, Seton House, Perry Family Health Center, and Fort Lincoln Family Medicine Center.

Providence maintained full accreditation by The Joint Commission and was also licensed by the District of Columbia Department of Health.

On October 16, 2017, the obstetrics unit was closed as part of a cost-savings measure. Patients received notice less than two months before the unit closed. Previously, Providence delivered between 1,500 and 2,000 babies a year.

In September 2018, Ascension announced that it would close the main hospital by the end of the year but continue operating its medical office buildings and Carroll Manor. The closing plan became a source of controversy for Ascension Health. The hospital served some of the most disadvantaged residents of the district. In December most of the hospitals services ended but under pressure and a lawsuit from the city government, the Emergency Department and ten inpatient beds remained open until April 30, 2019, at which point all remaining services were closed after 158 years of continuous service.

In July 2019, Ascension Health began operating Providence Urgent Care Center at the site of the old Providence Hospital. The center provides care for the treatment for a wide range of common, non-emergency illnesses.
