= Herrera v. Collins =

- Supreme Court of the United States

Argued October 7, 1992 Decided January 25, 1993
- Full case name: Leonel Torres Herrera, Petitioner v. James A. Collins, Director, Texas Department of Criminal Justice, Institutional Division
- Citations: 506 U.S. 390 (more) 113 S. Ct. 853; 122 L. Ed. 2d 203; 1993 U.S. LEXIS 1017; 61 U.S.L.W. 4108; 93 Cal. Daily Op. Service 512; 93 Daily Journal DAR 1024; 6 Fla. L. Weekly Fed. S 882

Case history
- Prior: Defendant convicted, 197th Judicial District Court of Cameron County, Texas; affirmed, 682 S.W.2d 313 (Tex. Crim. App. 1984); cert. denied, 471 U.S. 1131 (1985); petition for writ of habeas corpus denied, 819 S.W.2d 528 (Tex. Crim. App. 1991); cert. denied, 502 U.S. 1085 (1992); denial of petition for writ of habeas corpus affirmed, 904 F.2d 944 (5th Cir. 1990); certiorari denied, 498 U.S. 925 (1990); stay of execution vacated, 954 F.2d 1029 (5th Cir. 1992); cert. granted, 502 U.S. 1085 (1992).
- Subsequent: Rehearing denied, 507 U.S. 1001 (1993).

Holding
- The Supreme Court affirmed the judgment of the court of appeals, holding that the trial is "the paramount event for determining the guilt or innocence of the defendant."

Court membership
- Chief Justice William Rehnquist Associate Justices Byron White · Harry Blackmun; John P. Stevens · Sandra Day O'Connor; Antonin Scalia · Anthony Kennedy; David Souter · Clarence Thomas

Case opinions
- Majority: Rehnquist, joined by O'Connor, Scalia, Kennedy, Thomas
- Concurrence: O'Connor, joined by Kennedy
- Concurrence: Scalia, joined by Thomas
- Concurrence: White
- Dissent: Blackmun, joined by Stevens, Souter (parts I–IV)

Laws applied
- U.S. Const. amends. VIII, XIV

Herrera v. Collins, 506 U.S. 390 (1993), was a decision of the Supreme Court of the United States holding that claims of actual innocence do not, by themselves, provide a basis for federal habeas relief. The Court emphasized that federal habeas courts are not forums for retrying criminal cases and that "the presumption of innocence disappears" once a defendant has been convicted through due process of law.

The case arose from the 1982 capital murder conviction and death sentence of Leonel Torres Herrera for the 1981 murders of two Texas police officers. Herrera was convicted on strong evidence, including a dying identification by one of the victims and physical evidence linking him to the crimes. After unsuccessful direct appeals and collateral challenges, Herrera filed a second federal habeas petition claiming that executing a person who was actually innocent would violate the Eighth Amendment's prohibition on cruel and unusual punishment and the Fourteenth Amendment's Due Process Clause.

Earlier Supreme Court decisions had addressed claims of actual innocence only in the context of overcoming procedural defaults and other substantive restrictions on federal habeas review. Herrera was the first case in which the Supreme Court considered whether a freestanding claim of actual innocence could provide a basis for federal habeas relief.

== Background ==
Petitioner Leonel Torres Herrera was convicted of capital murder and sentenced to death in Texas in 1982. The convictions arose from the 1981 murders of Texas Department of Public Safety Officer David Rucker and Los Fresnos Police Officer Enrique Carrisalez. Herrera was convicted on strong evidence, including Officer Carrisalez's dying identification of Herrera as the shooter, physical evidence linking him to Officer David Rucker's murder, and a letter in his possession that "strongly implied" he had killed Rucker.

Unlike most federal habeas petitioners, Herrera alleged no defect at trial. Instead, after unsuccessful direct appeals and collateral challenges, he argued in his second federal habeas petition executing someone who was actually innocent would violate the Eighth Amendment's prohibition on cruel and unusual punishment and the Fourteenth Amendment's Due Process Clause.

Earlier Supreme Court decisions had addressed claims of actual innocence in the context of procedural barriers to federal habeas review. In Murray v. Carrier (1986), the Court held that a procedural default did not bar federal habeas review for a petitioner who could show that he was actually innocent. Later that year, Kuhlmann v. Wilson (1986) required prisoners filing successive habeas petitions to make a colorable showing of factual innocence by demonstrating a fair probability that, in light of all the evidence, a reasonable factfinder would have had reasonable doubt about guilt. Consistent with precedent barring Fourth Amendment exclusionary rule claims on federal habeas under Stone v. Powell (1976), the Court treated the accuracy of the conviction, rather than the admissibility of particular evidence, as the focus of the innocence inquiry.

== Procedural history ==
In 1992, Herrera’s attorneys presented newly discovered evidence claiming that his deceased brother, Raúl Herrera Sr., had committed the murders, supported by affidavits from former associates and Raúl Sr.’s son, who claimed to have witnessed the killings. Herrera argued that the evidence showed his actual innocence, but it was raised after the deadline for seeking a new trial under Texas law.

After his conviction was affirmed on direct appeal, Herrera unsuccessfully challenged his conviction through state and federal habeas petitions, primarily contesting the eyewitness identifications used at trial. He later filed a second habeas petition asserting that he was "actually innocent" based on newly discovered affidavits claiming that his deceased brother, Raúl Herrera Sr., had committed the murders. Additional affidavits, including one from Raúl Sr.’s son, alleged that Herrera was not present during the killings and that authorities had withheld exculpatory evidence in violation of Brady v. Maryland.

The federal district court granted Herrera a stay of execution to allow him to present his actual innocence claim in state court but denied most of his other claims as an abuse of the writ. It also granted an evidentiary hearing on his Brady claim. The federal court of appeals vacated the stay and characterized Herrera's Brady claim as a "disingenuous" attempt to present newly discovered evidence, holding that ""the existence merely of newly discovered evidence relevant to the guilt of a state prisoner is not a ground for relief on federal habeas corpus." The Supreme Court granted certiorari, and the Texas Court of Criminal Appeals stayed Herrera's execution.

The Supreme Court granted review to decide whether the Eighth and Fourteenth Amendments prohibit executing a person who is actually innocent of the crime of conviction.

== Supreme Court ==
Two questions were presented for the Supreme Court's review:

1. Do the Eighth and Fourteenth Amendments permit a state to execute an individual who is innocent of the crime for which he or she was convicted and sentenced to death?
2. What post-conviction procedures are necessary to protect against the execution of an innocent person?

=== Rehnquist's majority opinion ===
Chief Justice William Rehnquist authored the opinion of the Court, joined by Justices Sandra Day O'Connor, Anthony Kennedy, Antonin Scalia, and Clarence Thomas. The majority held that Herrera's evidence fell short of the "extraordinarily high" threshold showing required for the freestanding innocence claim the Court assumed might exist, without deciding the issue, and left the constitutional status of actual innocence unresolved.

The Court reasoned that Herrera was not without a means of presenting his claim of actual innocence because executive clemency functioned as the criminal justice system's ultimate "fail safe". The fundamental miscarriage of justice exception, the Court explained, treats actual innocence as a "gateway" to review of an otherwise barred constitutional claim.

The Chief Justice explained that, "absent an independent constitutional violation", review is limited to the evidence in the underlying record. The Court distinguished Herrera's claim from Jackson v. Virginia (1979), describing Jackson as coming "as close to authorizing evidentiary review of a state court conviction on federal habeas as any of our cases," but only insofar as it permitted review of whether the evidence satisfied the constitutional standard established in In re Winship (1970). Chief Justice Rehnquist reiterated Townsend v. Sain's (1963) principle that federal habeas courts do not revisit factual determinations made by state courts based solely on newly discovered evidence absent a legal or constitutional defect in the underlying proceedings.

The Court said that a death sentence does not require a different standard of federal habeas review. Although the Eighth Amendment requires increased reliability in the procedures used to impose a death sentence, as in Eddings v. Oklahoma (1982), the Court reasoned that retrying the case years later would not necessarily produce a more reliable result.

It noted that constitutional safeguards, including proof beyond a reasonable doubt under In re Winship, the right to counsel under Gideon v. Wainwright (1963), and disclosure of exculpatory evidence under Brady v. Maryland (1963), protect against wrongful convictions. But, as the Court explained, "the presumption of innocence disappears" once a defendant has been convicted through due process of law.

=== O'Connor's concurring opinion ===
Justice O'Connor wrote a concurring opinion. Although she joined the majority opinion, in her concurring opinion, O'Connor wrote that "the execution of a legally and factually innocent person would be a constitutionally intolerable event."

Dispositive for Justice O'Connor was that Herrera was "not innocent in any sense of the word." She was optimistic about clemency, believing that convincing claims of innocence could be addressed through the clemency process rather than by the Supreme Court:

[T]he Court has no reason to pass on, and appropriately reserves, the question whether federal courts may entertain convincing claims of actual innocence. That difficult question remains open. If the Constitution's guarantees of fair procedure and the safeguards of clemency and pardon fulfill their historical mission, it may never require resolution at all.

Joseph L. Hoffmann criticized Justice O'Connor's dissenting opinion for placing excessive faith in the effectiveness of procedural safeguards to prevent wrongful executions. He argued that factual and moral errors can occur even without procedural misconduct, because juries and judges, like prosecutors and police, are capable of making mistakes.

=== Scalia's concurring opinion ===
Antonin Scalia joined the majority, but added in passing that he found no basis, either in the Constitution or in case law, to conclude that executing an innocent but duly convicted defendant would violate the Eighth Amendment. He sharply criticized the dissenting justices' appeal to conscience:

If the system that has been in place for 200 years (and remains widely approved) "shocks" the dissenters' consciences … perhaps they should doubt the calibration of their consciences, or, better still, the usefulness of "conscience shocking" as a legal test.

=== White's concurring opinion ===
Justice Byron White concurred, stating that a petitioner would be entitled to relief only by showing, based on the newly discovered evidence and the trial record, that "no rational trier of fact could [find] proof of guilt beyond a reasonable doubt."

=== Blackmun's dissent ===
Justice Harry Blackmun, joined by Justices John Paul Stevens and David Souter, dissented, arguing that the relevant question was not whether a retrial would be more reliable than the original trial but whether newly discovered evidence undermined the reliability of the conviction sufficiently to permit execution. Blackmun believed that "[n]othing could be more contrary to contemporary standards of decency or more shocking to the conscience than to execute a person who is actually innocent."

The question was not whether a new trial would be more reliable than the first trial; it was whether, in light of the new evidence, the first trial was sufficiently reliable to allow the State to execute Herrera.

Justice Blackmun argued that the Court's habeas jurisprudence had already made a fact-based inquiry into the petitioner's guilt or innocence central to federal habeas review. He noted that Kuhlmann v. Wilson (1986), Murray v. Carrier (1986), and Smith v. Murray (1986) had shifted the focus of "successive, abusive, or defaulted claims" away from vindicating constitutional rights to the factual question of innocence. Relying on Judge Henry Friendly's view that finality should yield where a prisoner makes a colorable claim of innocence, Blackmun contended that the majority decision was inconsistent with those precedents and reflected a policy preference for denying habeas relief "whenever possible".

Blackmun would have remanded the case to the district court for a determination as to whether a hearing should be held and to resolve the merits of Herrera's claim of actual innocence.

== Subsequent developments ==
Four months after the Court's ruling, Herrera was executed. His last words were: "I am innocent, innocent, innocent. . . . I am an innocent man, and something very wrong is taking place tonight."

Herrera was decided before the widespread use of post-conviction DNA testing, and Herrera's innocence claim rested largely on late-produced hearsay affidavits. As DNA testing emerged as a reliable means of proving actual innocence, the decision's emphasis on finality became a focal point in debates over post-conviction innocence procedures. Several individuals later exonerated through post-conviction DNA testing, including Darryl Hunt, were denied relief under Herrera despite presenting evidence supporting their innocence. By the 2010s, all fifty states and the District of Columbia had enacted statutory rights to post-conviction DNA testing, and nearly all permitted untimely post-conviction innocence claims.

=== Supreme Court ===
In House v. Bell (2006), the Supreme Court reiterated that Herrera had assumed, without deciding, that a "truly persuasive demonstration of actual innocence" in a capital case might warrant federal habeas relief. The Court again declined to resolve that question, but stated that any freestanding claim of actual innocence would probably require a more demanding showing of innocence than the gateway standard established in Schlup v. Delo (1995).

Writing for the Court in District Attorney's Office v. Osborne (2009), Chief Justice John Roberts held that a defendant who has been convicted after a constitutionally adequate trial has only a limited liberty interest in post-conviction relief and, relying on Herrera v. Collins, declined to extend Brady v. Maryland to the post-conviction context. Once again assuming without deciding that a freestanding innocence claim might exist, the Court found that the available state procedures for post-conviction DNA testing were constitutionally adequate.

In McQuiggin v. Perkins (2013), the Court again observed that it had "not resolved" whether a freestanding claim of actual innocence is cognizable on federal habeas review.

=== Federal courts ===
Because Herrera and subsequent cases have not clearly established that new evidence of actual innocence warrants federal habeas review, lower courts have concluded that a state court's rejection of such a claim cannot overcome AEDPA's jurisdictional bar unless the state court judgment was "contrary to, or involved an unreasonable application of, clearly established Federal law, as determined by the Supreme Court of the United States."

Joseph L. Hoffmann said the Supreme Court's federalism concerns in Herrera v. Collins were misplaced. In his view, federal habeas litigation in capital cases had become dominated by procedural issues unrelated to the factual correctness of convictions. He described a system in which "state-court judgments are stayed for years, even decades," while defendants litigate procedural claims and states respond with technical habeas defenses unrelated to the merits of the case.

== See also ==
- List of people executed in Texas, 1990–1999

== Works cited ==
- Bright, Stephen B. (nd). "Capital Punishment: Race, Poverty & Disadvantage — Class Thirteen, Part One: Innocence" (PDF). Yale University.
- Garrett, Brandon L. (2008). "Claiming Innocence". Minnesota Law Review. 92 (6): 1629–1723.
- Hoffmann, Joseph L. (2000). "Substance and Procedure in Capital Cases: Why Federal Habeas Courts Should Review the Merits of Every Death Sentence". Texas Law Review. 78: 1771–1827.
- Federman, Cary (2006). The Body and the State: Habeas Corpus and American Jurisprudence. Albany, NY: State University of New York Press.
- Kaneb, Paige (2014). "Innocence Presumed: A New Analysis of Innocence as a Constitutional Claim". California Western Law Review. 50 (2): 171–240.
- Thomas, George C. III; Young, Gordon G.; Sharfman, Keith; Briscoe, Kate B. (2003). "Is It Ever Too Late for Innocence? Finality, Efficiency, and Claims of Innocence". University of Pittsburgh Law Review. 64 (2): 263–302.
