= Habeas corpus in the United States =

Recourse in US law against unlawful detention

In United States law, habeas corpus (/ˈheɪbiəs ˈkɔːrpəs/) is a recourse challenging the reasons or conditions of a person's confinement. Petitioning the government for habeas corpus is a right in the United States. Individual states may also afford persons the ability to petition their own state court systems for habeas corpus pursuant to their respective constitutions and laws when held or sentenced by state authorities.

Habeas corpus permits a court to collaterally review the final judgment of another court in contrast to other writs like certiorari and coram nobis that provide direct review of a judgment. Federal habeas review did not extend to those in state custody until almost a century after the nation's founding with the Habeas Corpus Act of 1867. The petition for habeas corpus is filed with a court that has jurisdiction over the custodian, and if granted, a writ is issued directing the custodian to bring the confined person before the court for examination into those reasons or conditions.

For many decades, most federal habeas petitions have been filed by state prisoners seeking post-conviction review of state-court judgments, since most crimes in the American system have historically been matters of state law. Modern habeas corpus rules, emphasizing comity and finality, have narrowed the circumstances in which courts may exercise this jurisdiction. The modern federal habeas statute that resulted, as amended by Congress to codify some of these limitations, is found at 28 U.S.C. § 2241.

== Statutory history ==
Habeas corpus was first established by statute in the Judiciary Act of 1789. This statutory writ applied only to those who "are in custody, under or by colour of the authority of the United States, or are committed for trial before some court of the same, or are necessary to be brought into court to testify" and not to those held by state governments, which independently afford habeas corpus pursuant to their respective constitutions and laws. From 1789 until 1866, the federal writ of habeas corpus was largely restricted to prisoners in federal custody, at a time when no direct appeals from federal criminal convictions were provided for by law. Habeas corpus remained the only means for judicial review of federal capital convictions until 1889, and the only means for review of federal convictions for other "infamous crimes" until 1891.

The writ of habeas corpus remained the only way that decisions of military courts could be reviewed by the Supreme Court until the passage of the Military Justice Act of 1983, which extended it to the writ of certiorari.

The authority of federal courts to review the claims of prisoners in state custody was not clearly established until Congress adopted a statute (28 U.S.C. § 2254) granting federal courts that authority in 1867, as part of the post-Civil War Reconstruction. The U.S. Supreme Court in the case of Waley v. Johnson (1942) interpreted this authority broadly to allow the writ to be used to challenge convictions or sentences in violation of a defendant's constitutional rights where no other remedy was available.

The 1948 amendments to the federal habeas statute provided that a court need not entertain a successive petition when the legality of the prisoner's detention had already been determined in a prior application and no new ground was presented.

== Federal law ==
28 U.S.C. § 2241 grants federal courts jurisdiction to issue writs of habeas corpus to persons held in custody under specified federal authority or in violation of federal law.

In the 1950s and 1960s, decisions by the Warren Court greatly expanded the use and scope of the federal writ largely due to the "constitutionalizing" of criminal procedure by applying the Bill of Rights, in part, to state courts using the incorporation doctrine. This afforded state prisoners many more opportunities to claim that their convictions were unconstitutional, which provided grounds for habeas corpus relief. Subsequent court rulings and legislation have somewhat narrowed the writ.

The Civil Rights Act of 1968 at 25 U.S.C. § 1303 makes habeas corpus available in federal court to test the legality of detention by Native American tribes.

=== Pre-AEDPA habeas procedures ===
By the mid-1990s, the Supreme Court had preserved limited avenues for federal habeas courts to address claims involving serious constitutional defects and the risk of miscarriages of justice. In Wright v. West (1992), Herrera v. Collins (1993), Kyles v. Whitley (1995), and Schlup v. Delo (1995), the Court addressed the scope of habeas review of actual innocence, Brady violations, and other constitutional claims. Herrera held that actual innocence was not itself a freestanding ground for habeas relief, while Schlup recognized actual innocence as a gateway to review of otherwise procedurally barred constitutional claims. Other procedural claims, including mixed questions of law and fact and ineffective assistance of counsel, remained important avenues for challenging convictions and sentences. The Antiterrorism and Effective Death Penalty Act of 1996 subsequently imposed additional statutory restrictions on federal habeas review.

=== AEDPA ===
In 1996, following the Oklahoma City bombing, Congress passed (91–8 in the Senate, 293–133 in the House) and President Clinton signed into law the Antiterrorism and Effective Death Penalty Act of 1996 (AEDPA) substantially limiting collateral postconviction review of state-court judgments. For the first time, its Section 101 set a statute of limitations of one year following conviction for prisoners to seek the writ. The Act limits the power of federal judges to grant relief unless the state court's adjudication of the claim has resulted in a decision that

1. Is contrary to, or has involved an unreasonable application of clearly established federal law as determined by the Supreme Court of the United States; or
2. Has resulted in a decision that was based on an unreasonable determination of the facts in light of the evidence presented in the state court proceeding.

In Williams v. Taylor (Terry Williams) (2000), the Supreme Court held that AEDPA changed the longstanding practice of de novo review, requiring federal courts to give greater deference to state-court judgments. The Court's earlier decision in Brown v. Allen (1953) had been understood to endorse de novo review, although Wright v. West (1992) questioned whether Brown had done so.

AEDPA's language raised several questions about the scope of federal habeas review. These included whether the use of "was" meant that federal courts could consider only the law in effect when the state court issued its decision, the distinction between a decision that was "contrary to" clearly established federal law and one involving an "unreasonable application" of that law, and the standard applicable when a state court had not adjudicated a claim on the merits. Federal courts addressed these and other questions in the years following AEDPA's enactment. In Cullen v. Pinholster (2011), for example, the Supreme Court held that federal courts sitting in habeas generally consider only the record that was before the state court. In Harrington v. Richter (2011), in an opinion by Anthony Kennedy, the Court interpreted § 2254(d) to require substantial deference to state-court decisions, characterizing its purpose as just stopping “short of imposing a complete bar on federal court relitigation of claims already rejected in state proceedings.”

After the 2011 term of the Supreme Court, federal habeas relief was available only in the rare case where “not one fair-minded jurist” could agree with the state court's understanding or application of federal law.

AEDPA barred second or successive petitions generally but with several exceptions. Petitioners who had already filed a federal habeas petition were required first to secure a certificate of appealability appropriate United States Court of Appeals, to ensure that such an exception was at least facially made out. The death penalty became a particularly important setting for debates over habeas corpus procedure. Joseph L. Hoffmann described the difficulty of reaching the merits of constitutional claims in capital cases as an extreme example of the “excessive proceduralism” of federal habeas corpus.

=== IIRAIRA ===
Habeas corpus allows noncitizens detained during immigration proceedings to challenge the legality of their detention and, in some circumstances, the immigration orders against them. The scope of habeas review has changed as Congress altered the procedures for reviewing immigration orders. Under the Immigration Act of 1917, Heikkila v. Barber (1953) treated habeas corpus as the sole means of challenging deportation orders because the statute made the Attorney General's decisions final. Shaughnessy v. Pedreiro (1955) subsequently allowed noncitizens to challenge deportation orders under the Administrative Procedure Act without first being detained. Congress replaced that framework in 1961 by assigning review of deportation orders to the courts of appeals.

The Illegal Immigration Reform and Immigrant Responsibility Act of 1996 (IIRAIRA) carried forward AEDPA's restrictions on judicial review of criminal noncitizens and broadened them to include certain grounds of inadmissibility, raising questions about the availability of habeas corpus review. In Immigration and Naturalization Service v. St. Cyr (2001), the U.S. Supreme Court said the Suspension Clause protects "the writ as it existed in 1789", that is, as a writ which federal judges could issue in the exercise of their common law authority. The Supreme Court concluded that did not preclude habeas corpus petitions raising legal challenges to removal orders, leaving the district courts with habeas jurisdiction over such claims. After St. Cyr Congress made changes to the law to limit judicial review of orders of removal and provide an "adequate substitute" for habeas review in accordance with the St. Cyr decision. This "Limited Review Provision" permits "review of constitutional claims or questions of law" for aliens who are removable because they have committed a crime.

== Suspension Clause ==
At the 1787 Constitutional Convention habeas corpus was first introduced with a series of propositions on August 20 by Charles Pinckney, a delegate from South Carolina. Habeas corpus was discussed and voted on substantively on August 28, 1787. Two votes were cast on a motion by Gouverneur Morris, delegate from Pennsylvania, for addition to the Constitution of the clause, "The privilege of the writ of Habeas Corpus shall not be suspended, unless where in cases of rebellion or invasion the public safety may require it." The first vote in favor of Mr. Morris's motion up to the word "unless" passed unanimously, but the second vote, which did not receive the required super majority of 9 out of 13 states (it failed by a vote of 7 to 3), specifically covered the suspension of the writ of habeas corpus proposed by Gouverneur Morris starting with the word "unless" as follows: "...unless where in cases of rebellion or invasion the public safety requires it." Charles Pinckney and Charles Rutledge representing South Carolina and James Wilson representing Pennsylvania opposed the suspension of the writ of habeas corpus proposed by Gouverneur Morris, with Pickney wanting more specific wording for the suspension, including a time limit for the suspension, stating, "it should not be suspended but on the most urgent occasions, and then only for a limited time not exceeding twelve months," while Rutledge and Wilson argued that granting the federal government the power to suspend the writ of habeas corpus was an unnecessary risk.

There has been much scholarly debate over whether the Suspension Clause positively establishes a right under the federal constitution, merely exists to prevent Congress from prohibiting state courts from granting the writ, or protects a pre-existing common law right enforceable by federal judges.

=== During the Civil War ===
==== Lincoln ====
On April 27, 1861, President Abraham Lincoln suspended the writ of habeas corpus in Maryland after the Baltimore riot of 1861 prompting the Supreme Court decision Ex parte Merryman. Lincoln chose to suspend the writ over a proposal to bombard Baltimore, favored by his General-in-Chief Winfield Scott. Congress was not yet in session to consider a suspension of the writs; however, when it came into session it failed to pass a bill favored by Lincoln to sanction his suspensions. During this period, Henry May, a sitting member of Congress from the opposing party, as well as the mayor, police chief, entire Board of Police, and the city council of Baltimore were arrested without charge and imprisoned indefinitely without trial.

Chief Justice Roger Taney ruled the suspension unconstitutional in Ex parte Merryman, stating that only Congress could suspend habeas corpus. Lincoln and his Attorney General Edward Bates ignored the Chief Justice's order. When Baltimore newspaper editor Frank Key Howard criticized the government for ignoring the ruling, federal troops arrested him without charge or trial and imprisoned him at Fort McHenry. In 1863, Howard wrote about his experience as a "political prisoner" at Fort McHenry in the book Fourteen Months in the American Bastille; two of the publishers selling the book were then arrested.

When Congress reconvened in July 1861, it declined to approve Lincoln's unilateral suspension of habeas corpus. Shortly thereafter, on September 17, 1861, the day the Maryland legislature was to reconvene, Lincoln imprisoned pro-Confederate members of the Maryland General Assembly without charges or hearings. Thus, the legislative session had to be cancelled.

On February 14, 1862, the war was firmly in progress and Lincoln ordered most prisoners released, putting an end to court challenges for the time being. He again suspended habeas corpus on his own authority in September that same year, however, in response to resistance to his calling up of the militia.

==== Congress ====
When Congress met again in December 1862, the House of Representatives passed a bill indemnifying the president for his suspension of habeas corpus. The Senate amended the bill, and the compromise reported out of the conference committee altered it to remove the indemnity and to suspend habeas corpus on Congress's own authority. That bill, the Habeas Corpus Suspension Act, was signed into law March 3, 1863. Lincoln exercised his powers under it in September, suspending habeas corpus throughout the Union in any case involving prisoners of war, spies, traitors, or military personnel. The suspension of habeas corpus remained in effect until Andrew Johnson revoked it on December 1, 1865.

General Ambrose E. Burnside had former Congressman Clement Vallandigham arrested in May 1863 for continuing to express sympathy for the Confederate cause after having been warned to cease doing so. Vallandigham was tried by a military tribunal and sentenced to two years in a military prison. Lincoln quickly commuted his sentence to banishment to the Confederacy. Vallandigham appealed his sentence, arguing that the Enrollment Act did not authorize his trial by a military tribunal rather than in ordinary civilian courts, that he was not ordinarily subject to court martial, and that Gen. Burnside could not expand the jurisdiction of military courts on his own authority. The Supreme Court did not address the substance of Vallandigham's appeal, instead denying that it possessed the jurisdiction to review the proceedings of military tribunals without explicit congressional authorization.

In 1864, Lambdin P. Milligan and four others were accused of planning to steal Union weapons and invade Union prisoner-of-war camps and were sentenced to hang by a military court. However, their execution was not set until May 1865, so they were able to argue the case after the war ended. In Ex parte Milligan (1866), the U.S. Supreme Court decided that Congress's 1863 suspension of the writ did not empower the President to try to convict citizens before military tribunals where the civil courts were open and operational. This was one of the key Supreme Court Cases of the American Civil War that dealt with wartime civil liberties and martial law.

==== Confederacy ====
In the Confederacy, Jefferson Davis also suspended habeas corpus and imposed martial law. Shortly after his inauguration as president of the Confederacy, an act of the Confederate Congress of February 27, 1862, was passed authorizing Davis to suspend the writ of habeas corpus and declare martial law "in such towns, cities, and military districts as shall, in his judgment, be in such danger of attack by the enemy". Although Davis had initially resisted the idea, he suspended the writ after receiving a telegram from General Theophilus Holmes complaining that his region was filled with disloyal persons and deserters and that he could not enforce conscription.

Suspensions of civil process in the Confederacy were used against suspected Unionists, meaning anyone who refused conscription, particularly in border states.

At least 2,672 civilians were subject to military arrest in the Confederacy over the course of its history, although this is likely an undercount given the incompleteness of records. Civil War historian Mark E. Neely Jr. said "there seems to be no difference in the arrest rate in those periods when the Confederate Congress refuse to authorization suspension of the writ of habeas corpus and those periods was authorized. ... civilian prisoners trickled into Confederate military prisons whether the writ of habeas corpus was suspended or not."

The Confederate Congress reauthorized the suspension twice more, in October 1862 and February 1864.

The Confederate Congress's final suspension act, passed in February 1864 at Jefferson Davis's request, was narrower than its predecessors. It authorized suspension only for specified offenses and only for persons detained by order of the President, Secretary of War, or commander of the Trans-Mississippi Department. The act required review of detainees' cases and release of those improperly held unless they could be promptly tried, and it expired on August 1, 1864. General John Bankhead Magruder illegally attempted to invoke the act in April 1864 against three individuals who had published an anti-war broadside in the fall of 1863. His clumsy tactics led to a Constitutional Crisis between the General and the Texas Supreme Court who held Magruder in contempt in May 1864 in State V. J. H. Sparks, 27 Texas Reports 502 (1864).

The last suspension lapsed on August 1, 1864, amid deep domestic opposition to the suspension, including from the Confederate vice president Alexander H. Stephens, Davis's political rival. Citing "discontent, disaffection, and disloyalty", Davis made entreaties in late 1864 and 1865 about the necessity of suspension, but bills to further suspend habeas corpus failed in the Confederate Senate.

=== Reconstruction ===
Following the end of the Civil War, numerous groups arose in the South to oppose Reconstruction, including the Ku Klux Klan. In response, Congress passed the Enforcement Acts in 1870–71. One of these, the Civil Rights Act of 1871, permitted the president to suspend habeas corpus if conspiracies against federal authority were so violent that they could not be checked by ordinary means. That same year, President Ulysses S. Grant suspended the writ of habeas corpus in nine South Carolina counties; the Act's sunset clause ended that suspension with the close of the next regular session of Congress.

=== Philippine Organic Act ===
In response to continuing unrest, the Philippine Commission availed itself of an option in the Philippine Organic Act of 1902, 32 Stat. 692, and on January 31, 1905, requested that Governor-General Luke Edward Wright suspend the writ of habeas corpus. He did so the same day, and habeas corpus was suspended until he revoked his proclamation on October 15, 1905. The suspension gave rise to the United States Supreme Court case Fisher v. Baker, 203 U.S. 174 (1906).

=== After the attack on Pearl Harbor ===
Immediately following the attack on Pearl Harbor, the governor of Hawaii Territory, Joseph Poindexter, at the specific request by Lieutenant General Walter Short, US Army, invoked the Hawaiian Organic Act, 31 Stat. 141 (1900), suspended habeas corpus, and declared martial law. Short was recalled to Washington, D.C. two weeks after the attack and subsequently Hawaii was governed by US Army Lieutenant Generals Delos Emmons and Robert C. Richardson Jr. for the remainder of the war. In Duncan v. Kahanamoku, 327 U.S. 304 (1946), the United States Supreme Court held that the declaration of martial law did not permit the trial of civilians in military tribunals for offenses unrelated to the military (in this case, public drunkenness).

In 1942, eight German saboteurs, including two U.S. citizens, who had secretly entered the United States to attack its civil infrastructure as part of Operation Pastorius, were convicted by a secret military tribunal set up by President Franklin D. Roosevelt. In Ex parte Quirin (1942), the U.S. Supreme Court decided that the writ of habeas corpus did not apply, and that the military tribunal had jurisdiction to try the saboteurs, due to their status as unlawful combatants.

The period of martial law in Hawaii ended in October 1944. It was held in Duncan v. Kahanamoku (1946) that, although the initial imposition of martial law in December 1941 may have been lawful, due to the Pearl Harbor attack and threat of imminent invasion, by 1944 the imminent threat had receded and civilian courts could again function in Hawaii. The Organic Act therefore did not authorize the military to continue to keep civilian courts closed.

After the end of the war, several German prisoners held in American-occupied Germany petitioned the District Court for the District of Columbia for a writ of habeas corpus. In Johnson v. Eisentrager (1950), the U.S. Supreme Court decided that the American court system had no jurisdiction over German war criminals who had been captured in Germany, and had never entered U.S. soil.

== Habeas corpus litigation after the September 11 attacks ==
The November 23, 2001, Presidential Military Order purported to give the President of the United States the power to detain non-citizens suspected of connection to terrorists or terrorism as enemy combatants. As such, that person could be held indefinitely, without charges being filed against him or her, without a court hearing, and without legal counsel. Many legal and constitutional scholars contended that these provisions were in direct opposition to habeas corpus, and the United States Bill of Rights and, indeed, in Hamdi v. Rumsfeld (2004) the U.S. Supreme Court re-confirmed the right of every American citizen to access habeas corpus.

In Hamdan v. Rumsfeld (2006) Salim Ahmed Hamdan petitioned for a writ of habeas corpus, challenging that the military commissions set up by the Bush administration to try detainees at Guantanamo Bay "violate both the UCMJ and the four Geneva Conventions". In a 5–3 ruling the Court rejected Congress's attempts to strip the court of jurisdiction over habeas corpus appeals by detainees at Guantánamo Bay. Congress had previously passed the Department of Defense Appropriations Act, 2006 which stated in Section 1005(e), "Procedures for Status Review of Detainees Outside the United States":

(1) Except as provided in section 1005 of the Detainee Treatment Act of 2005, no court, justice, or judge shall have jurisdiction to hear or consider an application for a writ of habeas corpus filed by or on behalf of an alien detained by the Department of Defense at Guantanamo Bay, Cuba. (2)The jurisdiction of the United States Court of Appeals for the District of Columbia Circuit on any claims with respect to an alien under this paragraph shall be limited to the consideration of whether the status determination ... was consistent with the standards and procedures specified by the Secretary of Defense for Combatant Status Review Tribunals (including the requirement that the conclusion of the Tribunal be supported by a preponderance of the evidence and allowing a rebuttable presumption in favor of the Government's evidence), and to the extent the Constitution and laws of the United States are applicable, whether the use of such standards and procedures to make the determination is consistent with the Constitution and laws of the United States.

On September 29, the U.S. House and Senate approved the Military Commissions Act of 2006, a bill which suspended habeas corpus for any alien determined to be an "unlawful enemy combatant engaged in hostilities or having supported hostilities against the United States" by a vote of 65–34. President Bush signed the Military Commissions Act of 2006 (MCA) into law on October 17, 2006. With the MCA's passage, the law altered the language from "alien detained ... at Guantanamo Bay":

Except as provided in section 1005 of the Detainee Treatment Act of 2005, no court, justice, or judge shall have jurisdiction to hear or consider an application for a writ of habeas corpus filed by or on behalf of an alien detained by the United States who has been determined by the United States to have been properly detained as an enemy combatant or is awaiting such determination." §1005(e)(1), 119 Stat. 2742.

The Supreme Court ruled in Boumediene v. Bush (2008) that the MCA unconstitutionally suspended the writ of habeas corpus and held that federal courts had jurisdiction to hear habeas petitions. The Court had previously held in Felker v. Turpin (1996) and INS v. St. Cyr (2001) that the Suspension Clause protects the writ as it existed in 1789, a principle that informed its decisions in Rasul v. Bush (2004) and Boumediene.

On June 11, 2007, a federal appeals court ruled that Ali Saleh Kahlah al-Marri, a legal resident of the United States, could not be detained indefinitely without charge. In a two-to-one ruling by the U.S. Court of Appeals for the Fourth Circuit, the Court held the President of the United States lacks legal authority to detain al-Marri without charge; all three judges ruled that al-Marri is entitled to traditional habeas corpus protections which give him the right to challenge his detainment in a U.S. Court. In July 2008, the U.S. Court of Appeals for the Fourth Circuit ruled, "if properly designated an enemy combatant pursuant to the legal authority of the President, such persons may be detained without charge or criminal proceedings for the duration of the relevant hostilities."

The Habeas Corpus Restoration Act of 2007 failed to overcome a Republican filibuster in the United States Senate in September 2007.

On January 21, 2009, President Barack Obama issued an executive order regarding the Guantanamo Bay Naval Base and the individuals held there. This order stated that the detainees "have the constitutional privilege of the writ of habeas corpus."

Following the December 1, 2011, vote by the United States Senate to reject an NDAA amendment proscribing the indefinite detention of U.S. citizens, the ACLU argued that the protections for individual liberty guaranteed to American citizens by habeas corpus were threatened. The New York Times has stated that the vote leaves the constitutional rights of U.S. citizens "ambiguous", with some senators including Carl Levin and Lindsey Graham arguing that the Supreme Court had already approved holding Americans as enemy combatants, and other senators, including Dianne Feinstein and Richard Durbin, asserting the opposite.

== Ongoing developments ==
In 2022 a 6–3 majority led by Justice Neil Gorsuch ruled in Brown v. Davenport that habeas corpus could only be used to challenge convictions made in which the court did not hold jurisdiction, and that it "could not use it to challenge a final judgment of conviction issued by a court of competent jurisdiction". This was built upon in 2023 when a 6–3 majority led by Clarence Thomas ruled in Jones v. Hendrix that a prisoner being convicted of an act which is not a crime, and thus being legally innocent, is not sufficient cause to file an appeal under habeas corpus.

In May 2025, Trump administration official Stephen Miller said regarding immigration cases, "the writ of habeas corpus can be suspended in a time of invasion", and that the Trump administration was "actively looking at" carrying out such a suspension, depending on "whether the courts do the right thing or not"; Article One of the United States Constitution forbids such a suspension "unless when in cases of rebellion or invasion the public safety may require it." To support its efforts to accelerate deportation, Trump administration officials have suggested the suspension of habeas corpus for those subject to deportation. During a Senate hearing on May 20, 2025, while questioned by Senator Maggie Hassan, U.S. Secretary of Homeland Security Kristi Noem incorrectly defined habeas corpus as "a constitutional right that the president has to be able to remove people from this country". In the same hearing, Senator Andy Kim questioned Noem how many times earlier in American history habeas corpus had been suspended and what part of the Constitution includes the suspension authority. She did not know the answer to either question, and Senator Kim informed her that that the authority comes from Article I.

On August 6, 2025, the portions of the Constitution regarding habeas corpus were removed from the Library of Congress's online Annotated Constitution text (specifically Article I: parts of Sections 8 and the entirety of Section 9, and Section 10). The Library of Congress posted to X that this was a coding error, and the missing text was reinstated the same day.

In February 2026, ProPublica reported that during the first 13 months of the second Trump presidency, immigrants filed more than 18,000 habeas corpus petitions, more than in the past three administrations combined (including Trump's first), largely regarding the administrations re-interpretation of who is eligible for bond under the Illegal Immigration Reform and Immigrant Responsibility Act of 1996. As of May 2026, almost 50,000 petitions have been filed.

== Federal habeas corpus statistics ==
=== Number of cases ===
In 2004, there were about 19,000 non-capital federal habeas corpus petitions filed and there were about 210 capital federal habeas corpus petitions filed in U.S. District Court. The vast majority of these were from state prisoners, not from those held in federal prisons. There are about 60 habeas corpus cases filed in the U.S. Supreme Court's original jurisdiction each year. The U.S. Courts of Appeal do not have original jurisdiction over habeas corpus petitions.

=== Types of cases in which petitions are filed ===
In 1992, less than 1% of federal habeas corpus petitions involved death penalty sentences, although 21% involved life sentences. At that time about 23% had been convicted of homicide, about 39% had been convicted of other serious violent crimes, about 27% had been convicted of serious non-violent crimes, and about 12% were convicted of other offenses. These are almost exclusively state offenses and thus petitions filed by state prisoners.

Exhaustion of state-court remedies often takes five to ten years after a conviction, so only state prisoners facing longer prison sentences are able to avail themselves of federal habeas corpus rights without facing a summary dismissal for failure to exhaust state remedies. The lack of state remedies to exhaust also means that the timeline for federal death penalty habeas review is much shorter than the timeline for state death penalty habeas review (which can take decades).

In 2004, the percentage of federal habeas corpus petitions involving state death sentences was still about 1% of the total.

=== Success rates ===
About 63% of issues raised in habeas corpus petitions by state court prisoners are dismissed on procedural grounds at the U.S. District Court level, and about 35% of those issues are dismissed based on the allegations in the petition on the merits (on the merits has a different meaning than what it's used for here). About 2% are either "remanded" to a state court for further proceedings (which poses an interesting problem of federalism – the federal court usually issues a writ to the state prison to release the prisoner, but only if the state court does not hold a certain proceeding within a certain time), or, far less frequently, resolved favorably to the prisoner on the merits outright. About 57% of habeas corpus issues dismissed on procedural grounds in 1992 were dismissed for a failure to exhaust state remedies.

Success rates are not uniform, however. James Liebman, Professor of Law at Columbia Law School, stated in 1996 that his study found that when habeas corpus petitions in death penalty cases were traced from conviction to completion of the case that there was "a 40 percent success rate in all capital cases from 1978 to 1995." Similarly, a study by Ronald Tabek in a law review article puts the success rate in habeas corpus cases involving death row inmates even higher, finding that between "1976 and 1991, approximately 47% of the habeas petitions filed by death row inmates were granted." Most habeas corpus petitioners in death penalty cases are represented by attorneys, but most habeas corpus petitioners in non-death penalty cases represent themselves. This is because federal funds are not available to non-capital state habeas petitioners to pay for attorneys unless there is good cause, there being no federal right to counsel in such matters. However, in state capital cases, the federal government provides funding for the representation of all capital habeas petitioners.

Thus, about 20% of successful habeas corpus petitions involve death penalty cases.

These success rates predate major revisions in habeas corpus law that restricted the availability of federal habeas corpus relief when AEDPA was adopted in 1996, over a decade ago. Post-AEDPA, the great disparity in success rates remains, however, with the federal courts' overturning of state capital cases a major reason that many states have been unable to carry out a majority of capital sentences imposed and have long backlog lists.

=== Disposition time ===
The time required to adjudicate habeas corpus petitions varies greatly based upon factors including the number of issues raised, whether the adjudication is on procedural grounds or on the merits, and the nature of the claims raised.

In 1992, U.S. District Courts took an average of two and a half years to adjudicate habeas corpus petitions in death penalty cases raising multiple issues that were resolved on the merits, about half of that time-length for other multiple issue homicide cases, and about nine months in cases resolved on procedural grounds.

AEDPA was designed to reduce the disposition times of federal habeas corpus petitions. But AEDPA has little impact in non-capital cases, where a majority of cases are dismissed on procedural grounds, very few prisoners prevail and most prisoners are not represented by attorneys. The disposition time in capital cases has actually increased 250% from the time of AEDPA's passage to 2004.

=== Filing rates ===
In 1991, the average number of federal habeas corpus petitions filed in the United States was 14 per 1,000 people in state prison, but this ranged greatly from state to state from a low of 4 per 1,000 in Rhode Island to a high of 37 per 1,000 in Missouri.

The Anti-Terrorism and Effective Death Penalty Act of 1996 (AEDPA) produced a brief surge in the number of habeas corpus filings by state prisoners, as deadlines imposed by the act encouraged prisoners to file sooner than they might have otherwise done so, but this had run its course by 2000, and by 2004, habeas corpus petition filing rates per 1,000 prisoners was similar to pre-AEDPA filing rates.

There was a temporary surge in habeas corpus petitions filed by federal prisoners in 2005 as a result of the Booker decision by the U.S. Supreme Court.
