= University of Virginia Center for Politics =

Nonpartisan organization based in Charlottesville, Virginia

- Established: 1998; 28 years ago
- Mission: Promoting the value of politics and the importance of civic engagement
- Director: Larry J. Sabato
- Address: Montesano, 2201 Old Ivy Rd., Charlottesville, Virginia, United States
- Location: Charlottesville, Virginia, United States
- Coordinates: 38°2′51″N 78°30′51″W
- Interactive map of University of Virginia; Center for Politics
- Website: centerforpolitics.org

The University of Virginia Center for Politics (CfP) is a nonpartisan institute at the University of Virginia. Based in Charlottesville, Virginia, the institute promotes the value of politics and the importance of civic engagement. It operates on the principle that "government works better when politics works better, and politics works better when citizens are informed and involved participants".

Founded in 1998 by professor and political analyst Larry Sabato, the institute is housed in Montesano, on property once owned by United States Senator Thomas S. Martin, and functions with the funding support from a variety of public and private sources.

Alongside its focus on civic education and engagement, the CfP also publishes Sabato's Crystal Ball, a source of comprehensive election analysis which is recognized as providing the most accurate electoral predictions.

== Mission ==
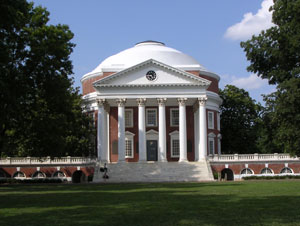
The University of Virginia

The Center for Politics was founded in 1998 by Larry Sabato, a professor at the University of Virginia, to put into practice his belief that "politics is a good thing!".

With an aim to "promote the value of politics and the importance of civic engagement" by improving the political process and citizens' interaction with it, the center seeks to influence the functioning of government itself. The institute's three core aims are:

- Encourage citizens to actively participate in the political process and government
- Evaluate and promote the best practices in civic education for students of all ages
- Educate citizens through the CfP's comprehensive research, programs, and publications

== History ==
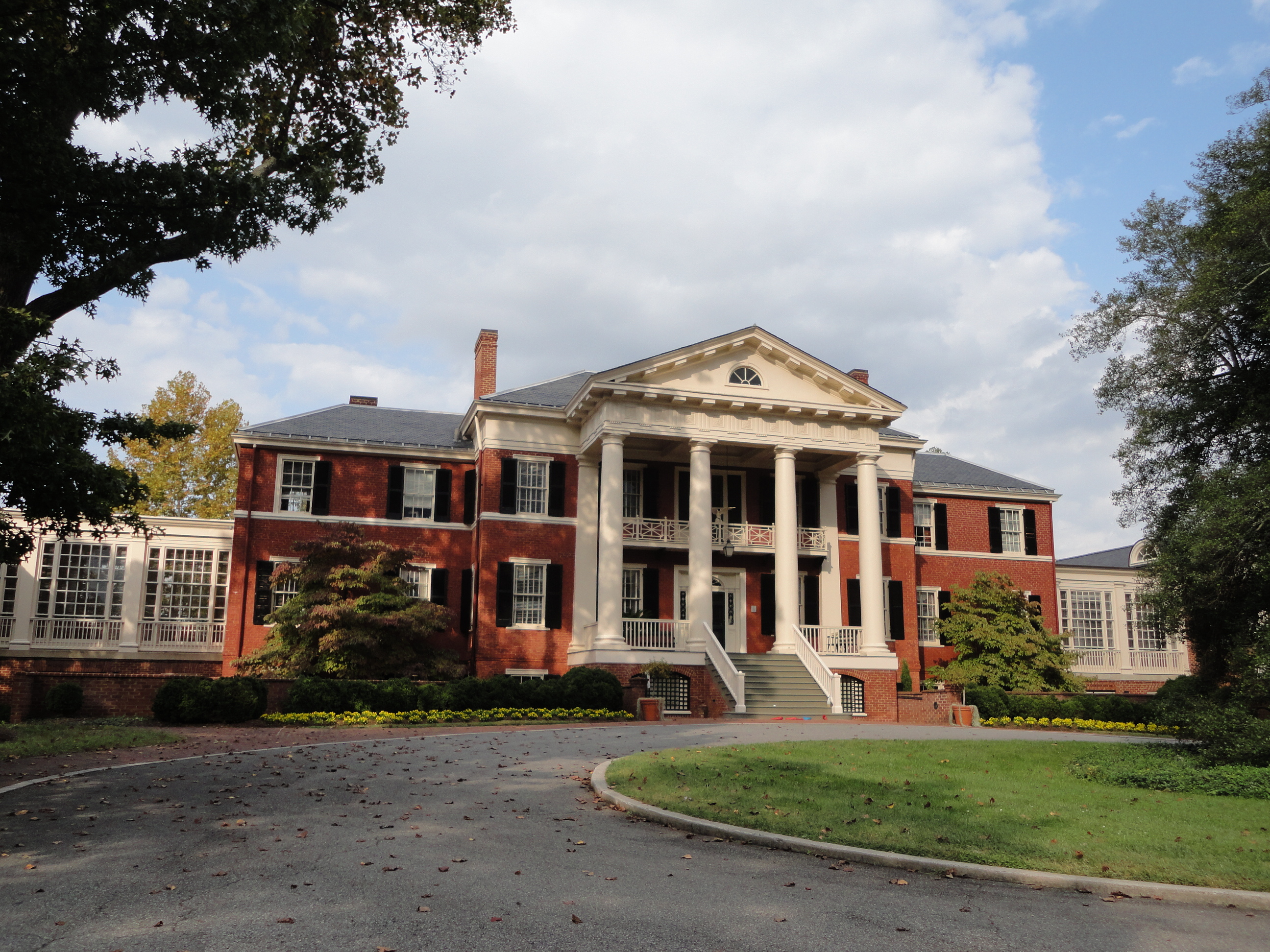
Montesano, the home of the Center for Politics

Having been founded in 1998 at the Center for Governmental Studies, its first program was the Virginia Governors' Conference, which evolved into the Virginia Political History Project, and a post-election conference which is now the annual American Democracy Conference.

In 1999, the CfP launched the Youth Leadership Initiative, and was noted as the nation's "only center dedicated to restoring the health of the American democratic system". In October 1999, the Center hosted the largest internet election in the nation's history with 10,000 students. In 2002, the Center's 'Crystal Ball' election predictions debuted.

In 2008, the Center moved into Montesano, an early 20th-century Georgian Revival house on land previously owned by Thomas Staples Martin, US Senator from Virginia. In 2009, the Center launched its newest program, Global Perspectives on Democracy, a program designed to foster dialogue between citizens in established and emerging democracies around the world and to conduct workshops on civic action plans.

== Youth Leadership Initiative ==
The Youth Leadership Initiative provides free, technology-based civic education materials to K-12 teachers and students in public and private schools in all 50 states and Defense Department schools internationally.

The program emphasizes hands-on participation so that students can directly experience the electoral and legislative procedures of American government. The components of the Youth Leadership Initiative include detailed lesson plans, an online mock election, an online policy-making simulation which engages students in the law-making process nationwide, and a political campaign-simulating computer game.

In 2008, Diane Trim of Inside the School, a website for secondary educators, ranked the Youth Leadership Initiative's mock election highly, giving it more stars than the other two educational mock election programs reviewed and praising the Youth Leadership Initiative program for its comprehensiveness and ease of use.

The Youth Leadership Initiative began as a response to a perception of increasing political apathy among citizens and a decline in the number of schools incorporating civics lessons into their curricula. It started in Virginia public schools, but is now nationwide.

Current partners include:

- American Bar Association
- National Association of Secretaries of State (NASS)
- World Wrestling Entertainment (WWE)
- Public Agenda
- League of Women Voters
- Close Up Foundation

== Sabato’s Crystal Ball ==
Sabato's Crystal Ball, founded by CfP Director Larry Sabato, is a free, nonpartisan weekly online newsletter and comprehensive website that analyzes the current American political scene and predicts electoral outcomes for U.S. House of Representatives, U.S. Senate, governors, and U.S. president races. Since it was first launched in September 2002, the Crystal Ball has garnered a reputation for fair analysis and accurate predictions and is frequently cited by journalists and other political watchers.

Over its lifetime, Sabato's Crystal Ball has a 98% accuracy rate in predicting U.S. House races, 98% accuracy rate in predicting U.S. Senate races (including 100% accuracy each of the past two election cycles), and 94% accuracy rate in predicting gubernatorial races. It also has featured commentary from renowned political scientists and journalists, including Alan Abramowitz of Emory University, James E. Campbell from the University at Buffalo, Dahlia Lithwick who writes for Newsweek and Slate, Thomas E. Mann from the Brookings Institution, and Barbara A. Perry from Sweet Briar College.

== Conferences ==
=== American Democracy Conference ===
The CfP hosts an annual post-Election Day conference to analyze the outcome of the year's campaigns and elections, discuss its impact on upcoming races and campaigns, and assess the overall state of American democracy. Previous conferences have included such speakers as journalists Dahlia Lithwick, Susan Page, and Rich Lowry, strategists Ed Rollins and Kiki McLean, and public officials Rep. Tom Davis, Rep. Artur Davis, U.S. Secretary of State Lawrence Eagleburger, and Sen. Mark Warner.

The 2009 American Democracy Conference was held on December 3 at the Newseum in Washington, DC and is co-sponsored by POLITICO. Keynote speakers were Virginia governor Tim Kaine, chairman of the Democratic National Committee, and Texas senator John Cornyn, chairman of the National Republican Senatorial Committee. Panelists included journalists Mike Allen and Susan Page; congressman Roy Blunt; and strategists Paul Begala, Alex Castellanos, and Leslie Sanchez.

=== Virginia Political History Conference ===
The Virginia Political History Conference focuses on the history of politics, policy, and political leadership in the CfP's home state of Virginia. The Virginia Political History Conference includes an annual summer conference, a documentary on the same subject, and accompanying research materials. The most recent conference focused on the 50th anniversary of the official end of Massive Resistance, Virginia's official policy to resist the integration of its public schools, with a conference at the Virginia State Capitol in Richmond, Virginia, featuring panels with students who were unable to attend school, as well as keynote speaker Douglas Wilder, the first African-American governor in U.S. history.

Eight documentaries have been produced in conjunction with the conference:

- No Higher Honor: Charles S. Robb
- No Higher Honor: John N. Dalton
- No Higher Honor: Mills E. Godwin
- No Higher Honor: Linwood Holton
- No Higher Honor: Gerald L. Baliles
- Wilder: An American First
- Sarge Reynolds: A Documentary
- Locked Out: The Fall of Massive Resistance

=== National Constitutional Convention ===
On October 17, 2007, the CfP hosted a National Constitutional Convention in Washington, D.C. The convention featured panel discussions on the U.S. Constitution, moderated by Bob Schieffer of CBS Face the Nation. The keynote speaker of the convention was Supreme Court Justice Samuel Alito, and it also featured remarks by former vice presidential nominee Geraldine Ferraro and former senator Bob Dole.

In conjunction with the convention and the publication of Larry J. Sabato's A More Perfect Constitution, the CfP produced a documentary, Questioning the Constitution. The film features interviews with Professor Larry J. Sabato, former Senate Majority Leader Robert J. Dole, NAACP Chairman Julian Bond, Republican National Committee Chairman Michael Steele and ACLU President Nadine Strossen. Questioning the Constitution won an Award of Excellence from the International Academy of Visual Arts.

== Publications ==
The CfP has been involved in a number of publications, from full-length books to academic reports. CfP Director Larry J. Sabato has written over a dozen books, most notably Feeding Frenzy, Year of Obama, and A More Perfect Constitution. The Dynamic Dominion and Virginia in the Vanguard by Frank Atkinson were published in partnership with the CfP. The CfP has also published the Political Challenges Series on a wide array of topical issues. Volumes in this series include Health Care Half Truths by Dr. Arthur Garson Jr. and Carolyn Engelhard, Freedom is Not Enough: Black Voters, Black Candidates, and American Presidential Politics by Ronald Walters, and Attack the Messenger by Craig Crawford.

The CfP also publishes reports, such as "Virginia Votes", a compendium of election results for the state of Virginia. In 2004, it published a report on civic education, "Politics: The Missing Link of Responsible Civic Education," which sought to explain the reason for a decline of civic engagement among young people and also provide solutions to the problem.

== Other programs ==
=== National Campaign for Political and Civic Engagement ===
The CfP is one of 20 colleges and universities participating in the National Campaign for Political and Civic Engagement. The Campaign began in 2003 as an initiative of the Harvard Institute of Politics. It focuses on three priorities:

- A Relationship with Electoral Politics
- A Focus on Career Development
- A Foundation in Civic Education

As part of the Campaign, the CfP organizes an annual Voter Registration Coalition to register students to vote. The CfP also grants Awards for Civic Excellence, stipends available to undergraduates at the University of Virginia to support internships in the field of politics. The CfP also offers internships to University of Virginia students and select undergraduate students from other institutions, as part of the focus on career development.

=== Global Perspectives on Democracy ===
Launched in March 2009, Global Perspectives on Democracy seeks to help educate and empower young leaders and representatives of marginalized minority groups in established and emerging democracies to identify and implement effective tools and strategies for civic action and advocacy through peaceful and productive means. The first initiative undertaken as part of Global Perspectives on Democracy was a two-way exchange program, with Sri Lankan citizens visiting the United States to learn about American democracy and two CfP staff members going to Sri Lanka to teach civics lessons and learn about the challenges in Sri Lanka.

=== National Symposium Series ===
Begun in 1999, this series of discussions explores "topical issues in American politics." The series brought then-presidential candidate Hillary Clinton to the University of Virginia, and has hosted several discussions on "taboo subjects" like the roles played by race, religion and gender in political campaigns. Other participants in the series include former presidential candidate Michael Dukakis, former New Hampshire Governor and White House Chief of Staff John H. Sununu, Democratic Party strategist Donna Brazile, former Connecticut Governor Lowell Weicker, and journalist Bob Woodward.
