= Miller Center of Public Affairs =

Think tank on United States presidency

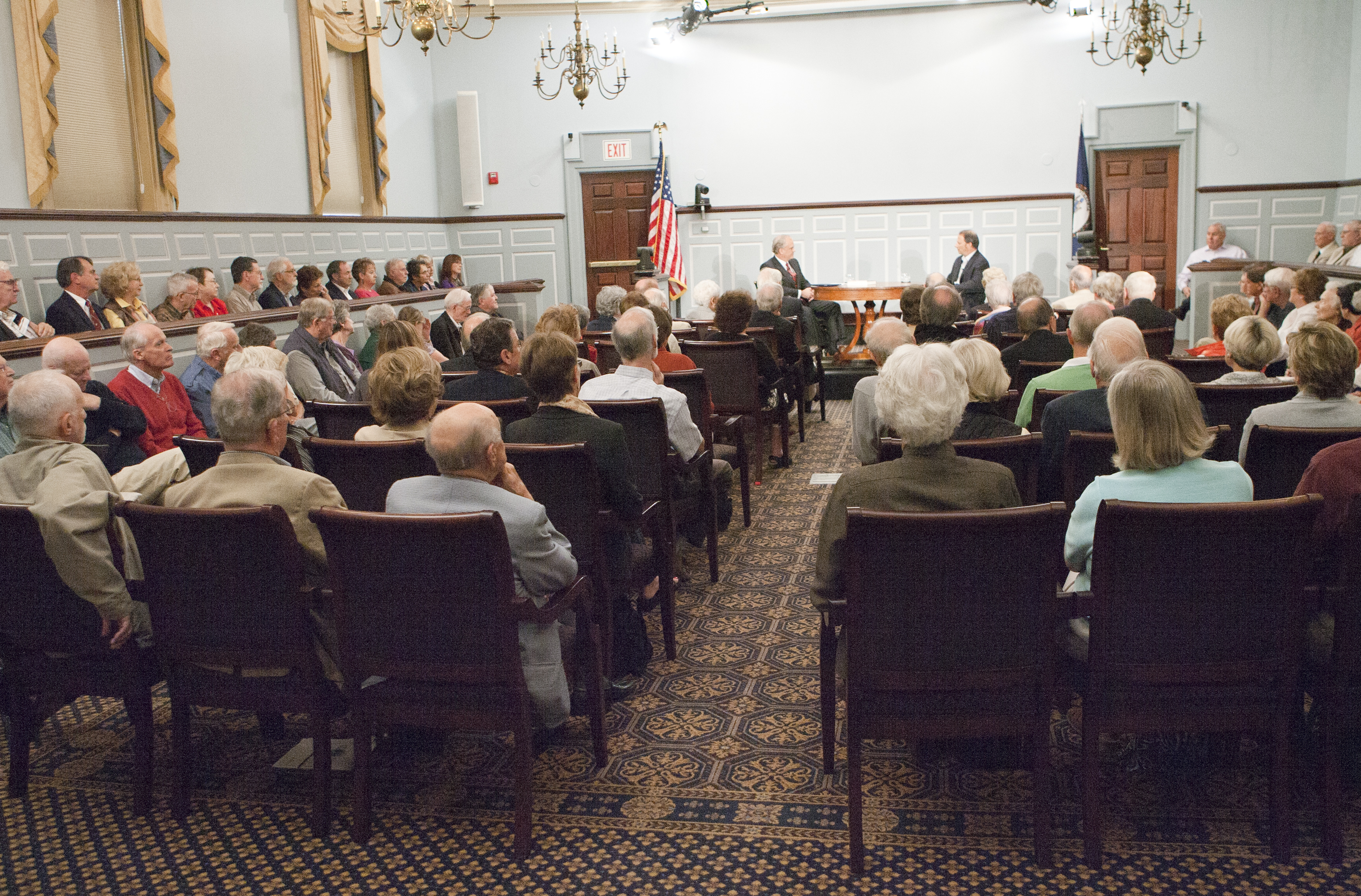
Miller Center of Public Affairs, 2013

The Miller Center is a nonpartisan affiliate of the University of Virginia that specializes in United States presidential scholarship, public policy, and political history. It is headquartered at Faulkner House.

== History ==
The Miller Center was founded in 1975 through the philanthropy of Burkett Miller, a 1914 graduate of the University of Virginia School of Law and prominent Tennessean, in honor of his father, White Burkett Miller. Through Miller's lead gift, as well as through past and present gifts by the center's supporters, the Miller Center's combined endowment now stands at more than $70 million. The center, under the oversight of its Governing Council, is an integral part of the University of Virginia, with maximum autonomy within the university system. Its programs are supported fully by funds it solicits (through the Miller Center Foundation) and its endowment.

== Programs ==
The Presidential Oral History Program interviews the principal figures in presidential administrations to create a historical record in the words of those who knew each administration best. The oral histories of Jimmy Carter, Ronald Reagan, George H. W. Bush, Bill Clinton, Edward Kennedy, and George W. Bush have been released. Barack Obama and Hillary Clinton are in progress.

The Presidential Recordings Program researches, transcribes, and annotates the thousands of hours of secret White House tapes recorded by U.S. presidents, from Franklin Roosevelt to Richard Nixon, plus Ronald Reagan.

The National Fellowship Program funds and supports PhD candidates who are studying the historical roots of today's policy issues. The program pairs fellows with leading scholars in their field, and teaches them how to make their scholarship more accessible to the public.

Academic Programs conduct scholarly study of modern political and presidential history, and convene conferences and symposia on the historical roots of contemporary policy issues.

Policy Programs bring together scholars, policymakers, and stakeholders to develop insights – grounded in scholarship and based on the lessons of history – to illuminate and offer solutions to the nation's policy challenges.

American President: An Online Reference Resource provides in-depth information on every presidential administration, including essays on all aspects of that administration that have been written or reviewed by presidential scholars.

== Leadership ==
William J. Antholis is director and CEO of the Miller Center.

Previous directors include:

- Frederick Nolting, United States Ambassador to South Vietnam (1975–1977)
- Kenneth W. Thompson, academic and author (1977–1998)
- Philip D. Zelikow, counselor of the United States Department of State and executive director of the 9/11 Commission (1999–2006)
- Gerald Baliles, 65th Governor of Virginia (2006–2014)

== University of Virginia office ==
The core of the Miller Center's facilities is the historic Faulkner House, built in 1856 and named for novelist William Faulkner, the university's writer-in-residence in 1957. Faulkner House was the home of United States senator Thomas S. Martin, who represented Virginia in the U.S. Senate from 1895 to 1919 and served as majority leader. In 1989, the center added the Newman Pavilion, which houses the Forum Room, and in 2003, it built the Thompson Pavilion and Scripps Library. The additions are prominent examples of new traditional architecture.
