= Alan Abramowitz =

American political scientist and author (born 1947)

- Born: Alan Ira Abramowitz; December 1, 1947 (age 78)

Academic background
- Education: University of Rochester (BA); Stanford University (MA, PhD)
- Thesis: An assessment of party and incumbent accountability in midterm congressional elections (1976)

Academic work
- Institutions: College of William & Mary; Stony Brook University; Emory University
- Main interests: Political science

Alan Ira Abramowitz (born December 1, 1947) is an American political scientist and author, known for his research and writings on American politics, elections in the United States, and political parties in the United States.

== Early life and education ==
Abramowitz graduated with a B.A. with high honors in political science from the University of Rochester in 1969. He attended graduate school at Stanford University, completing an M.A. in 1972 and a Ph.D. in 1976. Abramowitz' dissertation was entitled An Assessment of Party and Incumbent Accountability in Midterm Congressional Elections.

== Career ==
Abramowitz taught at the College of William & Mary from 1976 to 1982 and at Stony Brook University from 1982 to 1987. He then joined the faculty at Emory University as a professor of political science. Abramowitz was awarded the Alben W. Barkley Distinguished Chair in Political Science at Emory University in 1993.

Abramowitz has authored or co-authored five books. His 1992 book co-authored with Jeff Segal of Stony Brook University, Senate Elections, written in 1992, received two awards from political science associations and remains one of the seminal works in the study of senatorial elections to this day. Abramowitz has written extensively on many disparate topics in American politics, including presidential, Senate and House of Representatives elections, activism, polarization, ideology, partisanship, ideological realignment, incumbency, and redistricting.

=== Time-for-change model ===
In 1988, Abramowitz devised a model, which he termed the "time-for-change model", for predicting the outcome of the popular vote in United States presidential elections. The model makes its prediction based on only three inputs: "the growth rate of the economy during the second quarter of the election year, the incumbent president's approval rating at mid-year, and the length of time the incumbent president's party has controlled the White House." The last of these is what Abramowitz dubbed "the time-for-change factor", arguing that the longer a political party controls the presidency, the more likely the other party will be to win it back, since "voters attach a positive value to periodic alternation in power by the two major parties".

Abramowitz's model was correct in every presidential election from 1988 until 2016, when it predicted that Donald Trump would win the popular vote; he lost the popular vote to Hillary Clinton, although he did win the Electoral College. In May 2016, Abramowitz had predicted that Clinton would win the popular vote by an even larger margin, stating that his model assumed that both political parties would nominate mainstream candidates and that Trump broke this assumption.

== Select publications ==
Books

- Abramowitz, Alan I.; Rapoport, Ronald B.; McGlennon, John (1981). Party activists in Virginia: a study of delegates to the 1978 senatorial nominating conventions. Charlottesville: Institute of Government, University of Virginia. OCLC 7645639.
- Abramowitz, Alan I.; Stone, Walter J. (1984). Nomination politics: party activists and presidential choice. New York: Praeger. ISBN 0472081926. OCLC 560242080.
- Abramowitz, Alan I.; Rapoport, Ronald B.; McGlennon, John, eds. (1986). The Life of the parties: activists in presidential politics. Lexington, Kentucky: University Press of Kentucky. ISBN 9780813115597.

Available online as: Abramowitz, Alan I.; Rapoport, Ronald B.; McGlennon, John (1986). "Table of contents". The Life of the Parties: Activists in Presidential Politics. University Press of Kentucky. JSTOR j.ctt130jbn7. Project Muse.

- Abramowitz, Alan I.; Segal, Jeffrey A. (1992). Senate elections. Ann Arbor: University of Michigan Press. ISBN 9780472103454.
- Abramowitz, Alan I. (2004). Voice of the people: elections and voting in the United States. New York: McGraw-Hill. ISBN 9780072490657.
- Abramowitz, Alan I. (2010). The disappearing center: engaged citizens, polarization, and American democracy. New Haven: Yale University Press. ISBN 9780300162882.
- Abramowitz, Alan I. (2013). The polarized public? Why our government is so dysfunctional. Upper Saddle River, New Jersey: Pearson. ISBN 9780205877393.
- Abramowitz, Alan I. (2018). The Great Alignment: Race, Party Transformation, and the Rise of Donald Trump. New Haven: Yale University Press. ISBN 9780300207132.

Journal articles

- Abramowitz, Alan I.; Segal, Jeffrey A. (May 1986). "Determinants of the outcomes of U.S. Senate elections". The Journal of Politics. 48 (2): 433–439. doi:10.2307/2131102. JSTOR 2131102. S2CID 154252391.
- Abramowitz, Alan I.; Cover, Albert D.; Norpoth, Helmut (August 1986). "The President's party in midterm elections: going from bad to worse". American Journal of Political Science. 30 (3): 562–576. doi:10.2307/2111090. JSTOR 2111090.
- Abramowitz, Alan I. (October 2008). "Forecasting the 2008 Presidential election with the time-for-change model". PS: Political Science & Politics. 41 (4): 691–695. doi:10.1017/S1049096508081249. JSTOR 20452296. S2CID 153964974. Pdf.
- Abramowitz, Alan I. (November 14, 2013). "The Republican establishment versus The Tea Party". University of Virginia Center for Politics.
- Abramowitz, Alan I.; Webster, Steven (March 2016). "The rise of negative partisanship and the nationalization of U.S. elections in the 21st century". Electoral Studies. 41: 12–22. doi:10.1016/j.electstud.2015.11.001.
- Abramowitz, Alan I. (October 2016). "Will time for change mean time for Trump?". PS: Political Science & Politics. 49 (4): 659–660. doi:10.1017/S1049096516001268. Abstract.

== Sources ==
- Emory Department of Political Science: Alan I. Abramowitz
- Curriculum vitae: Alan I. Abramowitz
