= Actual innocence =

Standard of review in legal cases

Actual innocence is a special standard of review in legal cases to prove that a charged defendant did not commit the crimes that they were accused of, which is often applied by appellate courts to prevent a miscarriage of justice.

== Overview of claims of "actual innocence" ==
In its most literal sense, "actual innocence"—more properly understood as a claim that the prosecution has failed to prove factual guilt beyond a reasonable doubt—is a very commonly raised defense to a crime. Claims of actual innocence may involve disputing that any crime occurred at all, or that the accused was the perpetrator of the criminal act. Arguably, even affirmative defenses such as "self-defense", insanity, or "mistake of fact" qualify as "actual innocence" claims because while in those cases the accused admits to both their identity as the actor and to the existence of the act ("actus reus"), they are claiming that the State cannot prove that they had the requisite mental state ("mens rea") to constitute a crime.

However, the specific term "actual innocence" is most often used in the context of someone convicted for a crime they did not commit. Claims of "actual innocence" are, in that sense, usually raised in post-conviction challenges to a conviction. The Tarlton Law Library at the University of Texas at Austin maintains an "Actual Innocence awareness database" containing "resources pertaining to wrongful convictions, selected from the popular media (such as newspaper articles and segments which aired on television news magazines), journal articles, books, reports, legislation and websites".

In the United States, establishing "actual innocence" after a conviction may be considerably more difficult than winning an acquittal at trial, however. At trial, the defendant enjoys a due process right to the presumption of innocence, and the State is obligated to prove the guilt of the accused beyond a reasonable doubt. See, e.g., Cochran v. United States, 157 U.S. 286, 299 (1895). However, "innocence" is a factual question, and once a fact-finder—judge or jury—makes a factual determination, appellate and post-conviction courts generally are bound by those factual determinations. Appeals and post-conviction cases, by their very nature, focus on legal errors, not factual disputes. Indeed, it is unclear whether proof of actual innocence is, in and of itself, grounds for appellate reversal. Herrera v. Collins, 506 U.S. 390 (1993)

Convicted persons have two avenues for attacking the validity of their conviction or sentence. The first is direct appeal. Direct appeals are limited in number and scope, and address only those issues raised in the lower court. The second method of attacking the validity of a conviction is known as "collateral" review, and can take many forms, including state and federal petitions for writs of habeas corpus, petitions for writs of error coram nobis, and—increasingly—a newly developed form of collateral relief which allows petitioners to raise claims of actual innocence, whether through DNA testing or through some other method. Thus, it is in collateral, post-conviction filings that claims of actual innocence are most likely to be considered.

== The typical innocence defense ==
Because the prosecution must prove guilt beyond a reasonable doubt, a defendant asserting actual innocence need only raise a reasonable doubt as to whether they were the person who committed a particular crime, or whether the acts that they committed amount to the commission of a crime. In point of fact, the defendant is not obliged to present a defense at all.

Examples of an actual innocence defense include:

- Alibi – the defendant will present evidence of having been in a different location at the time the act occurred, thereby making it impossible for the defendant to have committed the crime.
- Mistaken identity – although the prosecution bears the burden of proving that a defendant has been properly identified, the defendant may still need to call into question the memory and credibility of witnesses claiming to have seen the commission of the crime. Alibi or mistaken identity defenses constitute "agency" defense—an argument that the accused is not the criminal agent.
- Frameup – the defendant will assert that falsification of evidence has resulted in the creation of a meritless case against them, usually by the police or similar persons of authority with access to the crime scene, or by private parties hoping to profit from the defendant's misfortune. If the prosecution is relying on the defendant's confession, the defendant may assert that a false confession was extracted through coercive means (such as via torture).

Many celebrated criminal cases have rested solely on the defense that the defendant did not commit the crime—for example, O. J. Simpson, Robert Blake, and Michael Jackson all claimed that they simply had not committed the acts charged. By contrast, defendants such as Jeffrey Dahmer, Susan Smith, and Lorena Bobbitt conceded that they committed the criminal act, but raised defenses such as insanity or diminished capacity. Other defendants, such as George Zimmerman, conceded that the act was committed, but asserted that it was justified, and therefore not a crime.

== "Actual innocence" pleas in post-conviction collateral proceedings ==
Because most forms of post-conviction collateral relief are limited to procedural or Constitutional flaws in the trial itself, claims of "actual innocence" generally are recognized only in those states which have adopted specific "actual innocence" statutes. Otherwise, in order to obtain post-conviction collateral relief, a defendant must often plead a specific statutory grounds for relief, i.e., that the conviction was obtained in violation of the Constitution of the United States. In jurisdictions that restrict a court's power to hear a post-conviction petition to a time period defined by statute, the court cannot grant post-conviction relief upon expiration of the time period regardless of the discovery of proof of "actual innocence" of the crime for which he was convicted. The jurisdictional bar is often rationalized by citing the requirement of finality of the judicial process in order to maintain the integrity of the system. While some argue that this is unjust for the convicted, it is rationalized that continued specter of "actual innocence" after the conclusion of a trial would make the adjudication process moot, which may lead to rule of law problems.

In the United States, this tradition has been heavily revised. As DNA testing grew more sophisticated, every state adopted statutes or rules allowing newly discovered DNA results to form the basis of a challenge to a conviction on grounds of "actual innocence". The scope and breadth of an inmate's ability to bring a DNA-based claim of actual innocence varies greatly from state to state. The Supreme Court has ruled that convicted persons do not have a constitutional due process right to bring DNA-based post-conviction "actual innocence" claims. District Attorney's Office v. Osborne, 557 U.S. 52 (2009). Thus, the way such claims are handled may vary greatly from one jurisdiction to the next.

Following reports of a sizable number of DNA-based exonerations, some states also have adopted broader "actual innocence" statutes allowing post-conviction challenges on the basis of newly discovered evidence in general. The Commonwealth of Virginia adopted such a law in 2004, subjecting petitioners to a very high standard of proof to overturn a conviction: that "the previously unknown or unavailable evidence is material and, when considered with all of the other evidence in the current record, will prove that no rational trier of fact would have found proof of guilt or delinquency beyond a reasonable doubt." Va. Code Ann. § 19.2-327.11. Upon the presentation of such evidence, the Virginia Court of Appeals (its intermediate appellate court) may reverse the conviction. In 2009 the State of Maryland adopted a law with a significantly lower standard: the new evidence must "create[] a substantial or significant possibility that the result may have been different[.]" Md. Code Ann., Crim. Pro. Art. §8-301. However, the Maryland law allows for a retrial rather than a summary reversal. The State of Utah has adopted an actual innocence statute. The legislatures of Wyoming and Missouri were considering similar laws in 2013.

Even in those jurisdictions without formal "actual innocence" provisions in their post-conviction statutes, actual innocence can have a procedural effect, in that it will excuse procedural default and permit the filing of a successor collateral relief petition. This is based on the U.S. Supreme Court's decision in Schlup v. Delo, 513 U.S. 298 (1995), in which a death row inmate filed a second federal habeas corpus petition, asserting as substantive claims the claims that his trial lawyer had ineffectively failed to present alibi witnesses and that the Government had wrongly concealed exculpatory evidence. Schlup also argued that he was actually innocent—not because that was a substantive ground for relief, but because his actual innocence excused his failure to raise his ineffective-counsel and prosecutorial-nondisclosure claims in his state court pleadings and in his first federal habeas petition. Whether or not relief was to be granted, the Schlup Court held, depended on the merits of his ineffective counsel and prosecutorial nondisclosure claims.

== Pleading in the alternative ==
Because pleading in the alternative is generally permitted in criminal cases, a defendant may claim to have not committed the crime itself, but at the same time may claim that if the defendant had committed the crime, the act was excused for a reason such as insanity or intoxication, or was justified due to provocation or self-defense. Such claims are, for obvious reasons, difficult to present to juries, because they entail arguing both that the defendant did and did not commit the crime alleged.

== An English perspective ==
Much of U.S. criminal law is derived from the English common law, in which the standard analysis is that (with the exception of strict liability offenses) a crime is made up of two parts: (i) the guilty act (actus reus) (ii) and the guilty intention (mens rea). A court examines the issues in sequence since there is little point in establishing intent if the accused did not commit the act. The court will convict only if the actus and the mens are shown beyond reasonable doubt. If convicted, the accused may contest either or both of the findings of actus or mens. England does not have the specific concept of "actual innocence" but the courts are concerned to ensure that an innocent person is not subject to a criminal penalty. The appeal process will not impose an onus of proof of "beyond reasonable doubt" to show innocence, but (even if the process takes years) a court will allow new evidence to be adduced if it tends to show that the accused did not (or could not) commit the crime. The United Kingdom, like all 47 Member States of the Council of Europe, is a signatory to the European Convention of Human Rights, and is prohibited by Article 3 from using the death penalty so there is no longer the fear that an innocent man may be executed. The case of prisoner Troy Davis, executed 21 September 2011, illustrates the difficulties that a person has, once convicted, to prove his "actual innocence" in the U.S.
