= House v. Bell =

- Supreme Court of the United States

Argued January 11, 2006 Decided June 12, 2006
- Full case name: Paul Gregory House, Petitioner v. Ricky Bell, Warden
- Docket no.: 04-8990
- Citations: 547 U.S. 518 (more) 126 S. Ct. 2064; 165 L. Ed. 2d 1; 2006 U.S. LEXIS 4674

Case history
- Prior: 311 F.3d 767 (6th Cir. 2002); cert. denied, 539 U.S. 937 (2003); 386 F.3d 668 (6th Cir. 2004); cert. granted, 545 U.S. 1151 (2005).

Holding
- Post-conviction DNA forensic evidence can be considered in death penalty appeals.

Court membership
- Chief Justice John Roberts Associate Justices John P. Stevens · Antonin Scalia; Anthony Kennedy · David Souter; Clarence Thomas · Ruth Bader Ginsburg; Stephen Breyer · Samuel Alito

Case opinions
- Majority: Kennedy, joined by Stevens, Souter, Ginsburg, Breyer
- Concur/dissent: Roberts, joined by Scalia, Thomas
- Alito took no part in the consideration or decision of the case.

Laws applied
- U.S. Const. amend. IV

House v. Bell, 547 U.S. 518 (2006), is a United States Supreme Court case challenging the permissibility of new DNA forensic evidence that becomes available post-conviction, in capital punishment appeals when those claims have defaulted pursuant to state law. The Court found that admitting new DNA evidence was in line with Schlup v. Delo (1995), which allows cases to be reopened in light of new evidence.

== Background ==
In 1985, Carolyn Muncey was bludgeoned to death in Luttrell, Tennessee, near Knoxville. Her body was found on an embankment the following day. Paul Gregory House, who was a friend of the Munceys, was charged with the murder. House was on parole and had a prior aggravated sexual assault conviction in Utah. Based on circumstantial evidence that House was spotted near the embankment, that blood consistent with that of the victim was found on House's jeans, and that semen consistent with House's was found on the victim's nightgown and underwear, House was found guilty at trial with aggravating factors that qualified him for capital punishment.

The Tennessee Supreme Court affirmed House's conviction and sentence, describing the evidence against House as "circumstantial" but "quite strong." Later, in a state trial court, House filed a pro se petition for post-conviction relief, arguing that he received ineffective assistance of counsel at trial and objecting to certain jury instructions. At a hearing before the same judge who conducted the trial, the court dismissed the petition, deeming House's trial counsel adequate and overruling House's other objections. On appeal House's attorney renewed only the jury-instructions argument and the Tennessee Court of Criminal Appeals affirmed, and both the Tennessee Supreme Court and the Supreme Court of the United States denied review.

House filed a second post-conviction petition in state court reasserting his ineffective-assistance claim. After extensive litigation regarding whether House's claims were procedurally defaulted, the Tennessee Supreme Court held that House's claims were barred under a state statute providing that claims not raised in prior post-conviction proceedings are presumptively waived.

House next sought federal habeas corpus relief, asserting numerous claims of ineffective assistance of counsel and prosecutorial misconduct.

In November 2002, the United States Court of Appeals for the Sixth Circuit reviewed the case in light of new DNA evidence that might exonerate House. The DNA taken from semen on the victim's clothing matched her husband, and not House. Additionally, House advanced the theory that the blood found on his jeans was spilled onto them from autopsy samples while the evidence was being transported from Tennessee to the FBI crime lab. Two witnesses came forward to say that the victim's husband, Hubert Muncey, had confessed to the murder.

In light of the new evidence, the Court of Appeals referred the case to the Tennessee Supreme Court, asking it to consider how the state law barring consideration of claims not raised in prior post-conviction appeals applies in this situation. In December 2003, the Tennessee Supreme Court refused to consider whether new DNA evidence presented during death penalty appeals necessitates a new trial, and declined to answer other questions posed. The Tennessee Supreme Court sent the case back to the Federal Court of Appeals.

The Federal Court of Appeals narrowly rejected House's appeal on October 6, 2004, in an 8-7 decision with strongly worded opinions from the dissenting judges.

On June 28, 2005, the U.S. Supreme Court agreed to take up the case, to reconsider under what circumstances death penalty cases could be reopened in light of new evidence.

== Opinion of the Court ==
Generally, claims that have defaulted under state law may not be granted federal habeas corpus review unless the petitioner provides a sufficient explanation for the default and demonstrates that the asserted error prejudiced his or her trial (that is, the error caused a different outcome). This standard, based on the principle of respect for state court judgments, is normally a difficult one for convicted defendants to meet.

The United States Supreme Court recognized a "miscarriage of justice" exception to the above rule for "extraordinary cases" in a 1995 decision, Schlup v. Delo. That decision held that prisoners asserting innocence as a gateway to federal review of defaulted claims must establish that, in light of new evidence, "it is more likely than not that no reasonable juror would have found petitioner guilty beyond a reasonable doubt."

In House v. Bell, the Supreme Court found that House’s arguments based on new DNA and other evidence were sufficient to meet the Schlup standard.

=== DNA evidence ===
DNA tests established that the semen on Mrs. Muncey's nightgown and underwear came from her husband, Mr. Muncey, not from House. The State argued that since neither sexual contact nor motive were elements of the offense, this evidence would have not affected the jury’s decision to convict House had it been available at trial.

The Supreme Court disagreed, stating that the new DNA evidence was of "central importance." A jury, informed that fluids on Mrs. Muncey's garments could have come from House, might have found that House traveled to the victim's home and lured her away in order to commit a sexual offense. According to the Court, a jury acting without the assumption that the semen could have come from House would have found it necessary to establish a different motive for her murder.

=== Bloodstains ===
The other relevant forensic evidence in House’s trial was Mrs. Muncey's blood, found on House's pants. House's attorneys argued that his pants were contaminated with samples of blood taken during Mrs. Muncey's autopsy.

Expert witnesses testified that Mrs. Muncey's blood samples taken during the autopsy were kept in test tubes without preservation. They said that in such conditions, certain enzymes invariably degrade. The matching blood found on House's pants showed similar enzyme decay, in a way that would not have occurred if the victim's blood had come into contact with House's pants while she was still alive.

Other evidence supported this theory. During the investigation of Mrs. Muncey's murder, the doctor who performed the autopsy passed the vials to two local law enforcement officers who transported it to the FBI, where further testing occurred. The blood was contained in four vials, evidently with neither preservative nor a proper seal. The vials, in turn, were stored in a foam box, but nothing indicates the box was kept cool. Rather, in violation of proper procedure, the foam box was packed in the same cardboard box as other evidence, including House's pants and other clothing. The cardboard box was carried in the officers' car, and transported while they made the 10-hour journey from Tennessee to the FBI lab. Blood vials in hot conditions (such as a car trunk in the summer) can blow open. By the time the blood reached the FBI it had hemolyzed, or spoiled, due to heat exposure. By the time the blood passed from the FBI to a defense expert, roughly a vial and a half were empty, though the agent who had analyzed it testified he used at most a quarter of one vial. Blood, moreover, was found to have seeped onto one corner of the foam box and onto packing gauze inside the box below the vials.

The Supreme Court declared that the bloodstains, as emphasized by the prosecution, seemed strong evidence of House's guilt at trial, but that new evidence raised substantial questions about the blood's origin and its timing.

=== A different suspect ===
In the post-trial proceedings, House's attorneys presented evidence that Mr. Muncey, the victim's husband, could have been the murderer. House's attorneys produced evidence from multiple sources suggesting that Muncey regularly abused his wife. Moreover, two witnesses at House's habeas hearing testified that, around the time of House's trial, Muncey had confessed to the crime. One witness recalled that she and "some family members and some friends [were] sitting around drinking" at her trailer when Muncey "just walked in and sit down." Muncey, who had evidently been drinking heavily, began "rambling off . . . talking about what happened to his wife and how it happened and he didn't mean to do it." According to the witness, Muncey "said [he and Mrs. Muncey] had been into [an] argument and he slapped her and she fell and hit her head and it killed her and he didn't mean for it to happen." The witness then said she "freaked out and run him off."

The Supreme Court found this evidence "troubling" but did not decide that it was conclusive. "If considered in isolation, a reasonable jury might well disregard" such testimony, the Court stated. "In combination, however, with the challenges to the blood evidence and the lack of motive with respect to House, the evidence pointing to Mr. Muncey likely would reinforce other doubts as to House's guilt."

=== Holding ===
Though the Supreme Court did not find that House was conclusively exonerated, it concluded that had the jury heard all the conflicting testimony, it is more likely than not that the reasonable juror would not be convinced of House's guilt beyond a reasonable doubt. Accordingly, House met the threshold standard set forth in Schlup and House's case was remanded for consideration of the constitutional claims that had defaulted due to state law.

== Subsequent developments ==
On remand to the Federal Court of Appeals, House's petition for relief was granted. He was released from prison several months later in 2006 but returned due to procedural challenges from the state, and held for two more years. The prosecutor originally said he would retry House and believed that he was involved in the murder, but finally dropped the charges in May 2009. He said that new, more refined DNA tests of forensic evidence pointed to an unknown perpetrator. House spent over 22 years on Tennessee's death row before being released on bond in 2008.
