= Larry Sabato =

American political scientist and analyst (born 1952)

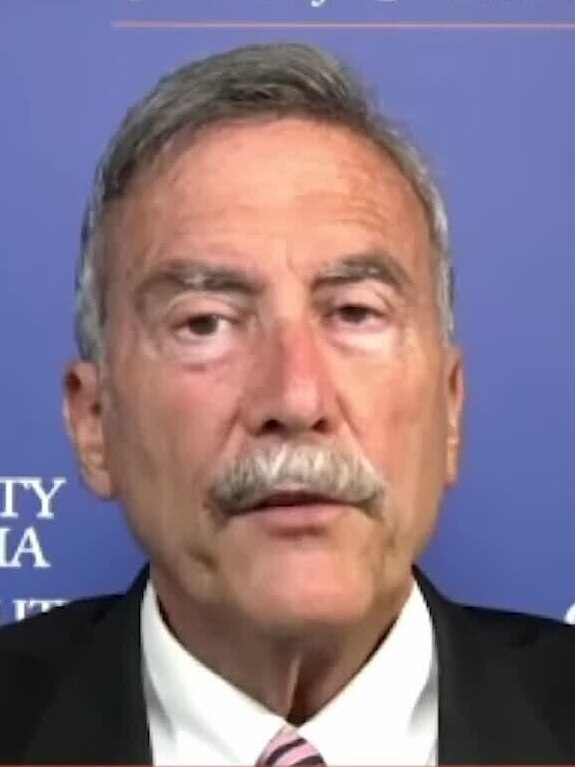
- Sabato in 2024
- Born: Larry Joseph Sabato; August 7, 1952 (age 74); Norfolk, Virginia, U.S.
- Occupations: Political scientist; political analyst; author

Academic background
- Education: University of Virginia (BA); Princeton University; Queen's College, Oxford (MA, DPhil)
- Thesis: The transformation of the American governorship, 1950–1975 (1977)

Academic work
- Institutions: University of Virginia; Center for Politics
- Website: Official website

Larry Joseph Sabato (/ˈsæbətoʊ/; born August 7, 1952) is an American political scientist and political analyst. He is a University Professor in the Department of Political Science at the University of Virginia, where he is also the founder and director of the Center for Politics, which works to promote civic engagement and participation. The Center for Politics is also responsible for the publication of Sabato's Crystal Ball, an online newsletter and website that provides free political analysis and electoral projections. He is well known in American political media as a popular pundit, and is interviewed frequently by a variety of sources.

== Early life and education ==
Sabato grew up in Norfolk, Virginia, graduating from Norfolk Catholic High School in 1970. Sabato is of Italian heritage. Sabato graduated from the University of Virginia in 1974. A 1974 Cavalier Daily poll showed more people could identify Sabato as student government president than could name Edgar F. Shannon Jr. as University president. Sabato graduated Phi Beta Kappa as a Government major. He followed his undergraduate degree with graduate study at Princeton University's Woodrow Wilson School of Public and International Affairs for one year. He was awarded a Rhodes Scholarship in 1975, which brought him to study at Queen's College, Oxford. In less than two years he earned his doctorate in politics from Oxford. Prior to his time as a political analyst, Sabato worked for nine years with Virginia Democratic Party politician Henry Howell. At the age of 15, Sabato joined Howell's first campaign for the Virginia governorship in 1968, and then worked on his successful run for lieutenant governor in 1971, and his campaigns for governor in 1973 and 1977.

== Professorship ==
Before becoming an academic at the University of Virginia, Sabato published works on the rise of two-party politics in the Southern United States, most notably his 1977 publication of The Democratic Party Primary in Virginia: Tantamount to Election No Longer. In 1978, Sabato became a member of the faculty at the University of Virginia. Since then he has engaged in research and taught more than 14,000 students. He is a University Professor and the Robert Kent Gooch Professor of Politics at the University of Virginia. In 2005, Sabato made a $1 million contribution to UVA, the largest gift ever given by a faculty member.

== Author ==
External videos
- Booknotes interview with Sabato on Feeding Frenzy, November 3, 1991, C-SPAN
- Interview with Sabato on Pendulum Swing, March 22, 2012, C-SPAN

Sabato is the author of over twenty books on politics, including Feeding Frenzy: Attack Journalism and American Politics and The Rise of Political Consultants: New Ways of Winning Elections. He is the co-author of Dirty Little Secrets: The Persistence of Corruption in American Politics with Glenn R. Simpson. In January 2011, he published Pendulum Swing, which analyzed the 2010 midterm elections and the potential effect of Republican Party victories on the 2012 presidential, congressional, and state-level elections.

Prior to Pendulum Swing, Sabato authored The Year of Obama in 2009 and A More Perfect Constitution in 2007, which discussed his ideas for amending the U.S. Constitution. Other Sabato books include The Sixth Year Itch: The Rise and Fall of the George W. Bush Presidency, Divided States of America: The Slash and Burn Politics of the 2004 Presidential Election, and Get in the Booth! A Citizen's Guide to the 2004 Election, and writes for Sabato's Crystal Ball. He has written textbooks used by high school and college American government classes, and has been a frequent guest analyst on cable news outlets and radio programs. With Karen O'Connor and Alixandra B. Yunas, he co-authored the textbook American Government: Roots and Reform.

=== Investigation of Kennedy assassination ===
External videos
- After Words interview with Sabato on The Kennedy Half-Century, November 22, 2013, C-SPAN

His book about John F. Kennedy, The Kennedy Half-Century: The Presidency, Assassination, and Lasting Legacy of John F. Kennedy, was published in 2013. It focuses on Kennedy's life, administration, and assassination, and contains research from focus groups, polling, and interviews with colleagues and eyewitnesses. After analyzing evidence regarding the assassination, Sabato discredited the 1979 United States House Select Committee on Assassinations (HSCA) conclusion of a possible second shooter, stating that it was "blown out the water".

== Sabato's Crystal Ball ==
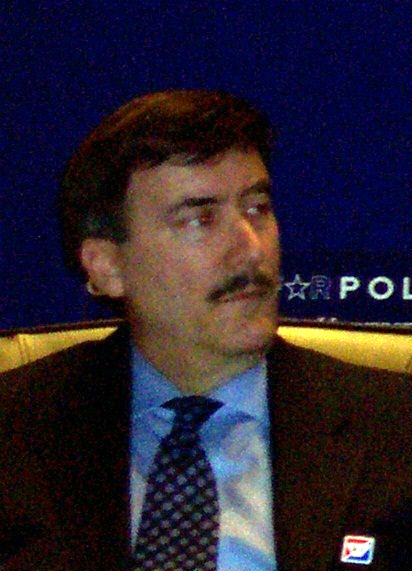
Sabato in 2008

Sabato's Crystal Ball is run by the University of Virginia Center for Politics in Charlottesville. The site contains analysis of an array of political races in the United States, including presidential elections, Senate, House, and gubernatorial contests.

=== Predictions accuracy ===
In 2002 midterm elections, where the Republican Party saw gains in both branches of Congress, Sabato's Crystal Ball website accurately predicted the outcome in 433 of the 435 contests for the House of Representatives and 32 of 34 Senate races. In 2004, when Republicans retained the White House and gained seats in the House and Senate, Crystal Ball correctly predicted the outcome of 525 of the 530 political races (99% accuracy), missing only one House race, one Senate race, one governor's race, and two states in the Electoral College. In August 2006, Crystal Ball predicted that the Democrats would gain 29 seats in the House of Representatives and 6 seats in the Senate, providing them with a majority in both chambers. Sabato's predictions proved correct: each of his 33 Senate predictions were accurate, and in the House, Democrats gained 29 seats on election night, the precise total predicted by Crystal Ball (Democrats went on to pick up a 30th seat in the December 12, 2006, runoff in Texas' 23rd district).

In 2006, Sabato was named the most accurate source of election predictions by MSNBC, CNBC, and Pew's Project for Excellence in Journalism. He was also the only national analyst who correctly predicted the exact Democratic gains in Senate and House contests. In July 2008, Crystal Ball correctly projected that Barack Obama would win the presidency in a near-landslide. Sabato predicted a 364–174 margin in the Electoral College, as well as the popular vote percentages. The prediction was merely one point off the mark, with the actual result on November 4, 2008, being Obama 365 to McCain 173. It did not predict an Obama win in Nebraska's 2nd district, as he did not make separate predictions for individual congressional districts in states that split their electoral votes on such factors (he started making separate predictions for such districts in 2012, probably because of this occurrence). Crystal Ball also accurately predicted 34 of all 35 Senate races, and 11 gubernatorial races correctly.

In November 2010, Crystal Ball projected that Republicans would pick up 55 seats in the House of Representatives, later the Republicans picked up 63 House seats. It predicted a pickup of 8 seats in the Senate for Republicans, later the Republicans picked up 6 Senate seats. In 2012, Crystal Ball projected that Obama would win the presidency with 290 electoral votes to 248 for Romney; there would be no change in partisan makeup of the Senate, with Democrats at 53 and Republicans at 47; and Democrats would pick up 3 seats in the House of Representatives, for a result of 239 Republicans and 196 Democrats. The projection was similar to the actual results but Crystal Ball underestimated Obama's number of electoral votes (332) and underestimated Democratic victories in both the Senate (Democrats picked up two seats) and in the House (Democrats picked up eight seats).

Crystal Ball made widespread incorrect predictions in 2016, wrongly predicting the outcome of the presidential race, as well as the outcomes of the Senate and House races. The night before voting took place, Sabato appeared on MSNBC and stated that Hillary Clinton would win 322 and Donald Trump would win 216 electoral college votes; in fact, Trump won 306 and Clinton won 232. Sabato and his staff summarized the results in an article entitled "Mea Culpa, Mea Culpa, Mea Maxima Culpa". Crystal Ball's predictions were more accurate in 2020. Crystal Ball predicted Joe Biden would win the presidency with 321 electoral votes to Trump's 217. Biden ended up winning 306 to Trump's 232, with North Carolina (15 electoral votes) being Crystal Ball's only incorrectly predicted state. In the Senate, Crystal Ball correctly predicted Democrats would regain control, although they predicted flips in Maine and North Carolina which did not materialize.

Crystal Ball predicted Kamala Harris would defeat Donald Trump in the 2024 presidential election, 276–262 in the Electoral College. This forecast was posted one day before the election with an acknowledgment by Crystal Ball that close polling made a forecast difficult to create. Trump defeated Harris 312–226 in the Electoral College.

In 2026, Crystal Ball predicted that Democrats would pick up 6 seats in the Senate, four governorships, and win a total of 239 seats in the House of Representatives. Ultimately, the Democratic wave would be bigger than Crystal Ball predicted, with Democrats gaining 9 seats in the Senate, 6 governorships, and winning a total of 260 seats in the House. However, Sabato's team made several surprising predictions which proved to be accurate, including Democratic Senate pickups in Kansas and Texas, alongside a late change to a "Leans R" race in Louisiana (where the Republican would win by under two points), citing signs of low Republican turnout in the South, which would prove to be accurate.

=== Earmark controversy ===
In June 2009, it was revealed that Sabato's Center for Politics had been the recipient of over $7 million in earmarked money from Congressman Virgil Goode, whom Sabato predicted would win re-election in 2008, despite declining poll numbers; Goode ultimately lost the race by fewer than 800 votes out of about 316,000 votes cast. Political blogger Greg Sargent suggested that Sabato should have revealed his Center's financial connection to Goode or recused himself from making predictions about the race.

== Political views ==
=== Criticism of Donald Trump ===
Sabato is a critic of President Donald Trump, stating he believed that Trump's first presidency was the "worst" in U.S. history. In July 2021, the Republican Party of Virginia demanded Sabato, as director of the non-partisan Center of American Politics, be investigated by the University of Virginia for his tweets criticizing Trump.
