= Robert O'Neal (murderer) =

Executed American murderer (1961–1995)

- Born: Robert Earl O'Neal Jr. September 25, 1961; Joplin, Missouri, U.S.
- Died: December 6, 1995 (aged 34); Potosi Correctional Center, Mineral Point, Missouri, U.S.
- Cause of death: Execution by lethal injection
- Motive: Burglary (Sharick murder); White supremacy (Dade murder)
- Convictions: Capital murder First degree murder
- Penalty: Life imprisonment (January 24, 1980); Death (May 15, 1985)

Details
- Victims: Ralph Roscoe Sharick, 78; Arthur Dade, 34
- Date: July 6, 1979; February 3, 1984
- Country: United States
- State: Missouri
- Date apprehended: August 25, 1979
- Imprisoned at: Missouri State Penitentiary

Robert Earl O'Neal Jr. (September 25, 1961 – December 6, 1995) was an American white supremacist and convicted murderer who was executed by the state of Missouri for the February 1984 murder of Arthur Dade, a 34-year-old black American man. O'Neal, who was serving a life sentence for the robbery and murder of 78-year-old Ralph Roscoe Sharick, stabbed Dade to death at the Missouri State Penitentiary. For the latter murder, O'Neal was sentenced to death and executed in 1995 at the Potosi Correctional Center via lethal injection. O'Neal is notable for being the only white person to be executed for killing a black person in the history of modern Missouri.

== Murders ==
=== Ralph Roscoe Sharick ===
On July 6, 1979, O'Neal and his accomplice, John E. Boggs, broke into the home of Doctor J. Larry Dowell in Strafford, Missouri. While burglarizing the home, Dowell's father-in-law, 78-year-old Ralph Roscoe Sharick, who lived in a trailer home behind the house, entered the property after hearing a disturbance. After confronting O'Neal and Boggs, Sharick was bound and placed into a chair in a closet. After stealing a saxophone, a guitar, and a couple of guns, O'Neal fired four shots with a .22 caliber gun into the closet, one of which fatally struck Sharick in the chest. His body was found later that night by Dowell when he returned home.

Boggs was captured and arrested two days later in Fort Worth, Texas. O'Neal remained a fugitive and became the subject of a multi-state manhunt. On August 25, 1979, he was captured in Enid, Oklahoma, after police received a tip from an area truck stop operator. He was found sleeping in a stolen truck and had been working in the Enid area. O'Neal was held without bail in the Greene County Jail. He was charged with capital murder, first degree burglary, stealing, and armed criminal action. On August 27, O'Neal waived extradition and was returned to Springfield, Missouri.

O'Neal and Boggs both pleaded innocent to all charges. Each accused the other of pulling the trigger. On January 24, 1980, O'Neal was convicted of first degree murder. On February 22, 1980, he was sentenced to life in prison by Circuit Judge James H. Keet. O'Neal was then transported to the Missouri State Penitentiary to serve his sentence. For his role in the crime, Boggs also received a life sentence. He was eventually granted parole but was barred from ever returning to Greene County.

=== Arthur Dade ===
While serving life in prison, O'Neal became a member of the white supremacist group, the Aryan Brotherhood, and was affiliated with Aryan Nations. On February 3, 1984, at noon, 34-year-old Arthur Dade, a black American man serving a 22-year sentence at the Missouri State Penitentiary for two armed robbery convictions in 1979, was attacked by three white inmates. O'Neal, accompanied by fellow inmates Lloyd Schlup and Rodnie Stewart, attacked Dade in a prison hallway outside the prison dining hall. Dade had been released from his cell to eat his noon meal. Schlup allegedly held Dade's arms, while Stewart threw hot liquid in Dade's face to distract him. O'Neal then stabbed Dade to death with a homemade ice pick. Dade was stabbed four or five times in the chest and once in his right arm. He was pronounced dead by prison physicians twenty minutes later. Both Dade and O'Neal were residents of the Special Management Unit, which was a special prison inside the Missouri State Penitentiary. The unit was used for the confinement of 400 of the most troublesome inmates.

O'Neal, Schlup, and Stewart were each charged with capital murder in the killing of Dade. Prosecutors called the killing a well-planned "Aryan hit." O'Neal claimed to have killed Dade in self-defense. Ultimately, all three suspects were found guilty. O'Neal and Schlup were sentenced to death, while Stewart was sentenced to life in prison. Schlup's death sentence was overturned in 1999 following Schlup v. Delo, in which he was retried, and pleaded guilty to second degree murder to avoid being sentenced to death.

== Execution ==
On December 6, 1995, O'Neal was executed at the Potosi Correctional Center via lethal injection. He was pronounced dead at 12:17 a.m. His final statement was, "Praise the Lord and the name of Jesus. I forgive everybody involved in this. Jesus is my Lord." He clutched a Bible to his chest during the execution. He declined a last meal and instead fasted all day on the day before his execution.

O'Neal's execution marked the rare occasion of a white person being executed for killing a black person. He remains the only white person to have been executed for killing a black person in the history of modern Missouri. Since the reinstatement of capital punishment in the United States in 1976, only 21 white people have been executed for murdering a black victim (less than 1.4 percent of all executions).

== See also ==
- Capital punishment in Missouri
- Capital punishment in the United States
- List of people executed in Missouri
- List of people executed in the United States in 1995
- List of white defendants executed for killing a black victim
- Race and capital punishment in the United States
- Schlup v. Delo
