= Brandon Garrett =

American law professor (born 1975)

Brandon L. Garrett
- Born: July 1, 1975 (age 51)
- Title: L. Neil Williams, Jr. Professor of Law; Director of the Wilson Center for Science and Justice

Academic background
- Education: Yale University; Columbia Law School

Academic work
- Discipline: Legal scholar
- Institutions: University of Virginia; Duke University School of Law
- Website: Official website

Brandon L. Garrett (born July 1, 1975) is an American legal scholar. He is the L. Neil Williams, Jr. Professor of Law and director of the Wilson Center for Science and Justice at Duke University School of Law, where he has taught since 2018. He was previously the White Burkett Miller Professor of Law and Public Affairs and Justice Thurgood Marshall Distinguished Professor of Law at the University of Virginia.

== Education ==
In 1997, Garrett received his BA from Yale University. In 2001, Garrett received his JD from Columbia Law School, where he was an articles editor of the Columbia Law Review and a James Kent Scholar.

== Career ==
Garrett clerked for Pierre N. Leval of the U.S. Court of Appeals for the Second Circuit. Garrett worked as an associate at Neufeld, Scheck & Brustin LLP in New York City. Beginning in 2005, Garrett taught at the University of Virginia and was the White Burkett Miller Professor of Law and Public Affairs and Justice Thurgood Marshall Distinguished Professor of Law. In 2015, he was a Visiting Fellow at All Souls College, Oxford University. In 2018, Garrett joined Duke University School of Law.

== Works ==
- Defending Due Process: Why Fairness Matters in a Polarized World (February 2025, Polity Books, Cambridge; Oxford; Boston; New York)
- Autopsy of a Crime Lab: exposing the flaws in forensics. Oakland, California: University of California Press. 2021. ISBN 9780520976634.
- The Death Penalty: Concepts and Insights (West Academic, 2018) (with Lee Kovarsky)
- End of its Rope: How Killing the Death Penalty Can Revive Criminal Justice (Harvard University Press, 2017)
- Too Big to Jail: How Prosecutors Compromise with Corporations. Harvard University Press. 3 November 2014. ISBN 978-0-674-74461-5.
- Federal Habeas Corpus: Executive Detention and Post-Conviction Litigation (Foundation Press, 2013) (with Lee Kovarsky)
- Convicting the Innocent: Where Criminal Prosecutions Go Wrong (Harvard University Press, 2011).
