= District Attorney's Office v. Osborne =

- Supreme Court of the United States

Argued March 2, 2009 Decided June 18, 2009
- Full case name: District Attorney's Office for the Third Judicial District, et al. v. Osborne
- Docket no.: 08-6
- Citations: 557 U.S. 52 (more) 129 S. Ct. 2308, 174 L. Ed. 2d 38, 2009 U.S. LEXIS 4536

Case history
- Prior: 110 P.3d 986 (Alaska App. 2005); 445 F. Supp. 2d 1079 (D. Alaska 2006); 163 P.3d 973 (Alaska App., 2007); 521 F.3d 1118 (9th Cir. 2008); cert. granted, 555 U.S. 992 (2008).

Holding
- In pursuing a civil claim under 42 U.S.C. § 1983, a convicted person does not have a constitutional right to post-conviction access to State's evidence for DNA testing.

Court membership
- Chief Justice John Roberts Associate Justices John P. Stevens · Antonin Scalia; Anthony Kennedy · David Souter; Clarence Thomas · Ruth Bader Ginsburg; Stephen Breyer · Samuel Alito

Case opinions
- Majority: Roberts, joined by Scalia, Kennedy, Thomas, Alito
- Concurrence: Alito, joined by Kennedy; Thomas (Part II)
- Dissent: Stevens, joined by Ginsburg, Breyer; Souter (Part I)
- Dissent: Souter

Laws applied
- U.S. Const. amend. XIV

District Attorney's Office for the Third Judicial District v. Osborne, 557 U.S. 52 (2009), was a case in which the United States Supreme Court decided that the Constitution's Due Process Clause does not require states to turn over DNA evidence to a party seeking a civil suit under 42 U.S.C. § 1983.

== Background ==
The case concerned the conviction of William G. Osborne on charges related to the rape and beating of a prostitute. The prostitute had been beaten with an axe handle, shot in the head, and left in an Alaskan snowbank. On a combination of eyewitness testimony and DNA evidence from a condom found at the scene, Osborne was convicted of kidnapping and sexual assault. He was sentenced to 26 years in prison for these offenses. The testing method used on the condom, DQ Alpha, was a relatively inexact form of DNA testing that generally cannot narrow the perpetrator down to less than 5% of the population.

After his conviction, Osborne sought for the state's evidence to be put to Restriction Fragment Length Polymorphism (RFLP) testing according to his rights under Alaska Statute §12.72.010(4) (2008) for postconviction relief, and according to his State and Federal Constitution rights. The Alaska Court of Appeals ruled Osborne had neither Federal constitutional right to postconviction testing, due to lack of precedent, nor a State constitutional right, on the basis that the other evidence of his guilt was too strong and RFLP testing was not likely to be conclusive. Alaska prosecutors do not dispute that advanced DNA testing could potentially prove Osborne's innocence beyond any doubt, but refused to allow him additional testing despite a decade-old request.

Following the refusal, Osborne filed suit, claiming the state violated his right to due process. In this suit, Osborne challenged the state's "deprivation of any rights . . . secured by the Constitution" and requested the DNA evidence against him be tested at his personal expense by Short Tandem Repeat (STR) analysis, a method more discriminating than both RFLP and DQ Alpha, and unavailable at the time of his trial. The State instead insisted that Osborne's claim must be brought under 28 U.S.C. §2254, which allows a prisoner to seek "a writ of habeas corpus . . . on the ground that he is in custody in violation of the Constitution." Osborne argued against this approach, as access to evidence, or even vindication through said access, would not automatically invalidate his conviction. The case was ultimately brought before the Supreme Court, which overturned a Ninth Circuit Court of Appeals judgement in Osborne's favor and ruled that "assuming Osborne’s claims can be pursued using §1983, he has no constitutional right to obtain postconviction access to the State’s evidence for DNA testing."

== Opinion of the Court ==
Chief Justice Roberts delivered the opinion of the Court, in which Justices Scalia, Kennedy, Thomas, and Alito joined. Justice Alito filed a concurring opinion, in which Justice Kennedy joined, and in which Justice Thomas joined as to Part II. In the majority opinion, the Supreme Court found that Alaska provided for discovery in postconviction proceedings, and has through judicial decision, specified that such discovery is available to those seeking access to evidence for DNA testing. The Court decided these procedures are similar to those provided by federal law and the laws of other States, and they satisfy due process. Osbourne brought this case under section 1983 without ever using procedures in filing a state or federal habeas claim relying on actual innocence. The Court found he had not tried to use the process provided to him by the State or attempted to vindicate the liberty interest that was disputed in this case. As such, the Court found no substantive due process rights infringed.

Justice Stevens filed a dissenting opinion, in which Justices Ginsburg and Breyer joined, and in which Justice Souter joined as to Part I. Justice Stevens found Osborne made full use of available state procedures in his efforts to secure access to evidence for DNA testing so that he might avail himself of the postconviction relief afforded by the State of Alaska, but that he was repeatedly rebuffed in a manner which left doubt about the adequacy of the procedural protections afforded to litigants under Alaska Stat. §12.72.010(4), and which proved contrary to the majority assertion that Osborne could gain access to the evidence were he simply to seek it through the State's discovery procedures. Justice Souter filed a separate dissenting opinion on procedural grounds, arguing that while Alaska had facially reasonable conditions guaranteeing access to DNA evidence, the way it went about applying those conditions added up to procedural unfairness that violated the Due Process Clause.

== Analysis and commentary ==
Some consider the decision to be a rebuke of the Innocence Project, which offered to fund Osborne's DNA testing and had exonerated 240 prisoners as of the date of the decision. Additionally, former FBI Director William S. Sessions was among those who sought to have the evidence revealed, arguing the Justice Department should intervene and demand testing since the department's very name implies "justice". He wrote "Why should our criminal justice system be afraid?"
