= Schlup v. Delo =

- Supreme Court of the United States

Argued October 3, 1994 Decided January 23, 1995
- Full case name: Lloyd Schlup, Petitioner v. Paul K. Delo, Superintendent, Potosi Correctional Center
- Citations: 513 U.S. 298 (more) 115 S. Ct. 851; 130 L. Ed. 2d 808; 1995 U.S. LEXIS 701

Case history
- Prior: 11 F.3d 738 (8th Cir. 1993); cert. granted, 511 U.S. 1003 (1994).

Holding
- A condemned man can bypass the procedural bar on successive federal habeas corpus petitions if he shows that "a constitutional violation has probably resulted in the conviction of one who is actually innocent".

Court membership
- Chief Justice William Rehnquist Associate Justices John P. Stevens · Sandra Day O'Connor; Antonin Scalia · Anthony Kennedy; David Souter · Clarence Thomas; Ruth Bader Ginsburg · Stephen Breyer

Case opinions
- Majority: Stevens, joined by O'Connor, Souter, Ginsburg, Breyer
- Concurrence: O'Connor
- Dissent: Rehnquist, joined by Kennedy, Thomas
- Dissent: Scalia, joined by Thomas

Schlup v. Delo, 513 U.S. 298 (1995), was a case in which the United States Supreme Court expanded the ability to reopen a case in light of new evidence of actual innocence.

Petitioner Lloyd E. Schlup, Jr., a Missouri prisoner under a sentence of death for the 1984 murder of an inmate named Arthur Dade, filed a habeas corpus petition alleging that constitutional error deprived the jury of critical evidence that would have established his innocence. At trial, the state's evidence consisted of the testimony of two corrections officers who had witnessed the murder. Schlup's defense was that the videotape from a camera in the dining room showed that he was not the man that killed Arthur Dade. The United States Supreme Court granted certiorari to consider whether the Sawyer v. Whitley standard provides adequate protection against the kind of miscarriage of justice that would result from the execution of a person who is actually innocent.

== Background ==
Lloyd Schlup, an inmate at the Missouri State Penitentiary, was convicted of murder and sentenced to death for the stabbing of another inmate in 1984 based on the testimony of two corrections officers. The Missouri Supreme Court affirmed the conviction and sentence, and the Supreme Court denied certiorari.

Schlup filed a petition of habeas corpus at the district court after exhausting the state law procedures. He claimed ineffective assistance of counsel, but the district court ruled this was procedurally barred and denied relief without a hearing. The Court of Appeals affirmed after finding the trial counsel's performance had been constitutionally adequate.

Schlup filed a second petition claiming new evidence (received in the State's response to the second petition) would prove his innocence. The district court dismissed the claim on August 23, 1992 as procedurally barred because he did not show cause for waiting to raise an innocence claim. The Court said Schlup did not meet the high burden for the "Sawyer gateway", an equitable exception that would allow a defaulted claim of actual innocence to proceed, but did not make any finding about the new affidavit.

Schlup filed a motion on September 7, 1993, to set aside the motion based on a new affidavit that identified the assailant as someone other than Schlup, but the district court again denied the motion. The appeals court denied an application for a stay of execution. The Supreme Court granted certiorari.

== Opinion of the Court ==
The Court began by distinguishing Schlup from Herrera v. Collins where it was argued that the execution of an innocent person would violate the Eighth Amendment even if no constitutional errors occurred during the trial. (Note: Herrera did claim a Brady violation, but the Supreme Court was petitioned and granted certiorari only for the "free standing" claim of innocence: Would the execution of an innocent person convicted by a "fair procedure" offend the Constitution? See Herrera v Collins 506 U.S. 390, 397 (1993))

Schlup did not claim he had a substantive right to not be executed because he was innocent. Instead, he sought a narrow "miscarriage of justice” exception would allow his defaulted Strickland and Brady claims to proceed after a convincing showing of actual innocence.

The Court held that the standard of Murray v. Carrier, which requires a habeas petitioner to show that "a constitutional violation has probably resulted in the conviction of one who is actually innocent," id., at 496—rather than the more stringent Sawyer standard, governs the miscarriage of justice inquiry when a petitioner who has been sentenced to death raises a claim of actual innocence to avoid a procedural bar to the consideration of the merits of his constitutional claims. The exception is dependent on the petitioner's credible showing of innocence with reliable evidence. To meet the standard in Murray v. Carrier, the petitioner must show that it is more likely than not that no juror would have convicted given the new evidence. The Supreme Court remanded for determination of whether Schlup showed this evidence as required by Carrier.

== Subsequent developments ==
In 1996, Schlup was granted a writ of habeas corpus on the ground that his original trial attorney failed to adequately represent him. In 1999, on the second day of his re-trial, Schlup agreed to plead guilty to second degree murder in exchange for a life sentence with parole eligibility. Schlup's co-defendant, Robert Earl O'Neal, was executed for his role in Dade's murder in 1995.

== See also ==
- List of United States Supreme Court cases, volume 513
- List of United States Supreme Court cases by the Rehnquist Court
