= PS – Political Science & Politics =

PS: Political Science & Politics
- Discipline: Political science
- Language: English
- Edited by: Phillip Ardoin, Paul Gronke

Publication details
- Former name: PS
- History: 1968-present
- Publisher: Cambridge University Press on behalf of the American Political Science Association (United States)
- Frequency: Quarterly
- Impact factor: 0.789 (2014)

Standard abbreviations
- ISO 4: PS Polit. Sci. Polit.

Indexing
- ISSN: 1049-0965
- JSTOR: 10490965

Links
- Journal homepage; Online access; Online archive; Journal page at association website

PS: Political Science & Politics is a quarterly peer-reviewed academic journal covering all aspects of contemporary political phenomena and political science, published by Cambridge University Press on behalf of the American Political Science Association. The journal was established in 1968 as PS, obtaining its current title in 1988. The editors-in-chief are Phillip Ardoin and Paul Gronke (Appalachian State University).

According to the Journal Citation Reports, the journal has a 2014 impact factor of 0.789, ranking it 74th out of 161 journals in the category "Political Science".
