= White Burkett Miller =

American lawyer

- Born: September 30, 1866; Rhea County, Tennessee, U.S.
- Died: October 4, 1929 (aged 63); Lookout Mountain, Tennessee, U.S.
- Occupation: Lawyer
- Spouse: Mary Lua Gibson
- Children: 2 sons
- Parent(s): James Lafayette Miller; Lucretia Tennessee Burkett
- Relatives: T. M. Burkett (uncle)

White Burkett Miller (September 30, 1866 – October 4, 1929) was an American lawyer from Tennessee. He served as special assistant to the Attorney General of the United States twice. He is the namesake of the Miller Center of Public Affairs at the University of Virginia.

== Early life ==
White Burkett Miller was born on September 30, 1866, in Rhea County, Tennessee. His uncle, Colonel T. M. Burkett, was a lawyer.

Miller clerked for his uncle in Athens, Tennessee until he was admitted to the bar of McMinn County, Tennessee in 1887. He subsequently joined the Tennessee Bar Association, the American Bar Association, and the Bar Association of the City of New York.

== Career ==
Miller joined the law firm Burkett and Miller in Dayton, Tennessee in 1889. It later became known as Burkett, Miller and Mansfield. Miller co-founded Burkett, Miller and Moore in Chattanooga, Tennessee in 1906 with his uncle, T. M. Burkett, and C. C. Moore. By 1919, he co-founded another law firm with his sons. When Linton Martin became a partner, the law firm became known as Miller, Miller and Martin.

Miller held federal appointments. He was appointed special assistant to the Attorney General of the United States, George W. Wickersham, in 1909–1913. He was reappointed in the same capacity in 1923, serving under Attorney General William D. Mitchell. Additionally, he served as special counsel in federal lawsuits involving The Coca-Cola Company as well as the Southern cities of Raleigh, North Carolina and Savannah, Georgia.

Miller served on the board of directors of the Volunteer State Life Insurance Company.

== Civic activities ==
Miller served as the chair of the Loyal Order of Moose of Tennessee. He was also a member of the Dayton Lodge of the Knights of Pythias and the Elks Lodge of Chattanooga.

== Personal life ==
Miller married Mary Lua Gibson, the granddaughter of Confederate General John C. Vaughn, on September 5, 1889. They had two sons: Burkett Miller and Vaughn Miller. They resided in Lookout Mountain, Tennessee.

Miller was a member of St. Paul's Episcopal Church. He was also a member of the Chattanooga Golf and Country Club.

== Death and legacy ==
Miller died on October 4, 1929, at his private residence in Lookout Mountain near Chattanooga, Tennessee. His son, Burkett Miller, established the Miller Center of Public Affairs at the University of Virginia in his honor. Moreover, a professorial chair at the University of Virginia, currently held by Philip D. Zelikow, is named in his honor.
