= Faulkner House (Charlottesville, Virginia) =

Historic house in Virginia, United States

- U.S. National Register of Historic Places
- Virginia Landmarks Register
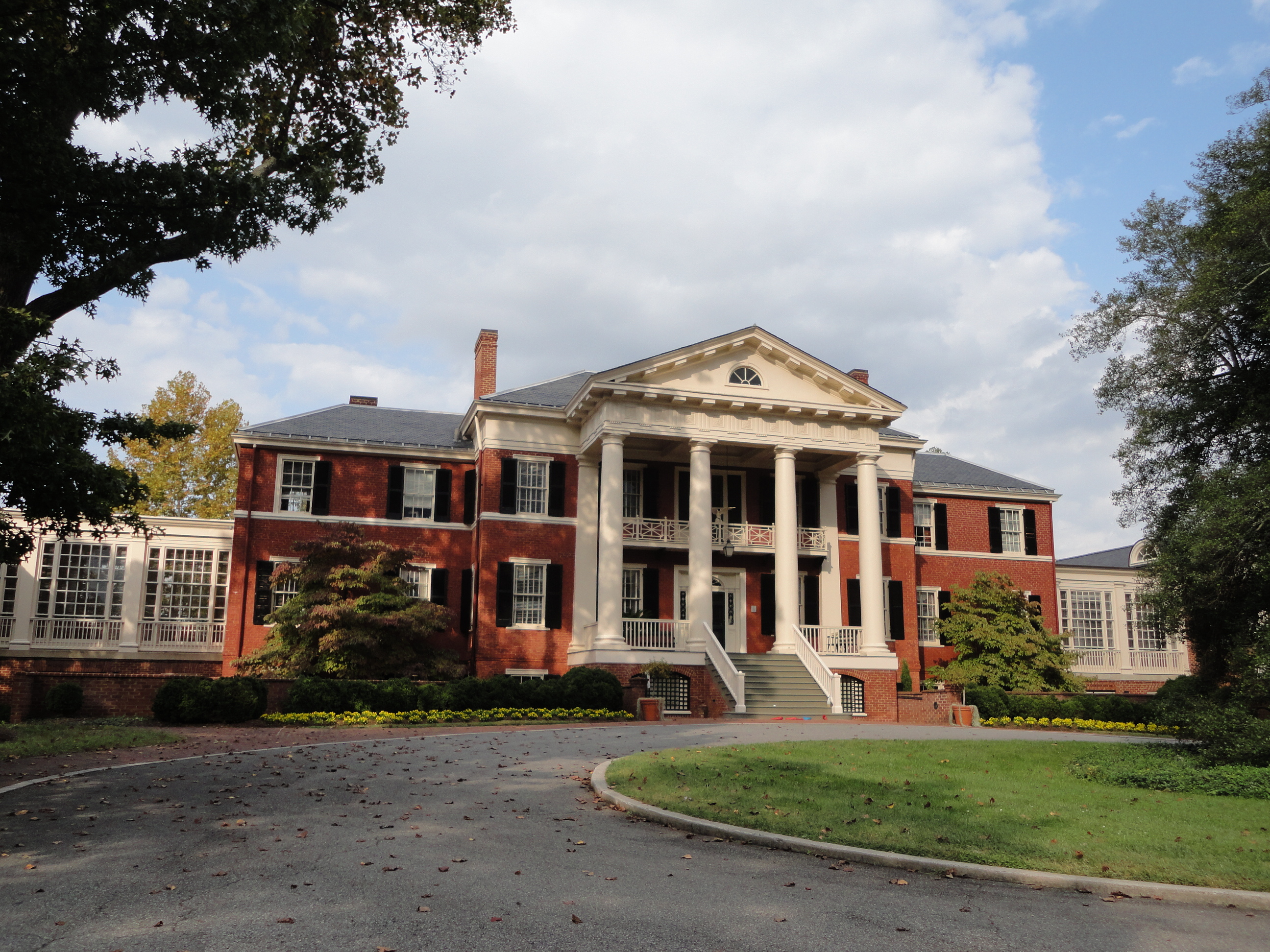
- Faulkner House, September 2012

- Location within Virginia Location within the United States
- Interactive map showing the location of Faulkner House
- Location: 2201 Old Ivy Rd., near Charlottesville, Virginia
- Coordinates: 38°2′51″N 78°30′51″W
- Area: 2.5 acres (1.0 ha)
- Built: 1855-1856, 1907
- Architect: Wood, Waddy
- Architectural style: Colonial Revival
- NRHP reference No.: 84003484
- VLR No.: 002-0146

Significant dates
- Added to NRHP: May 3, 1984
- Designated VLR: March 20, 1984

Faulkner House, also known as Seymour, Montesano, Garallen, and Old Ivy Inn, is a historic home located near Charlottesville, Albemarle County, Virginia. It was built in 1855–1856, and enlarged and remodeled in 1907 in the Colonial Revival style under the direction of architect Waddy B. Wood. The original section is the central two-story, brick structure topped by a hipped roof. In 1907, the house was enlarged with the addition of recessed, two-story, single-pile side wings and monumental front portico. Toward the end of the American Civil War, the house served as temporary headquarters of Union General Thomas Devin and was the home of Senator Thomas S. Martin from 1906 to 1919.

It was added to the National Register of Historic Places in 1984. Since 1975, Faulkner House has served as the headquarters of the Miller Center of Public Affairs.
