= Murray v. Carrier =

- Supreme Court of the United States

Argued January 21, 1986 Decided June 26, 1986
- Full case name: Edward R. Murray, Director, Virginia Department of Corrections, v. Clifford W. Carrier
- Citations: 477 U.S. 478 (more) 106 S.Ct. 2639, 91 L.Ed.2d 397
- Argument: Oral argument

Case history
- Prior: Carrier v. Hutto, 754 F.2d 520 (CA4 1985)

Holding
- The cause and prejudice rule applies to appeals, so a person ordinarily cannot file a habeas petition to review a constitutional problem that their lawyer did not complain about in their initial appeal.

Court membership
- Chief Justice Warren E. Burger Associate Justices William J. Brennan Jr. · Byron White; Thurgood Marshall · Harry Blackmun; Lewis F. Powell Jr. · William Rehnquist; John P. Stevens · Sandra Day O'Connor

Case opinions
- Majority: O'Connor, joined by Burger, White, Powell, Rehnquist
- Concurrence: Stevens (in judgment), joined by Blackmun
- Dissent: Brennan, joined by Marshall

Murray v. Carrier, 477 U.S. 478 (1986), is a United States Supreme Court case decided in 1986. The Court held that the "cause and prejudice" rule applies to appeals, so a person ordinarily cannot file a habeas petition to review a constitutional problem that their lawyer did not complain about in their initial appeal. The lawyer must have deliberately declined to raise the constitutional issue rather than inadvertently failed to do so. More specifically, the Court held that "the existence of cause for a procedural default must ordinarily turn on whether the prisoner can show that some objective factor external to the defense impeded counsel's efforts to comply with the State's procedural rule." The majority opinion was authored by Justice Sandra Day O'Connor. This case was part of a backlash in the early 1980s against an increase in the number habeas petitions, some of which delayed executions.
