= Thomas S. Martin =

American politician (1847–1919)

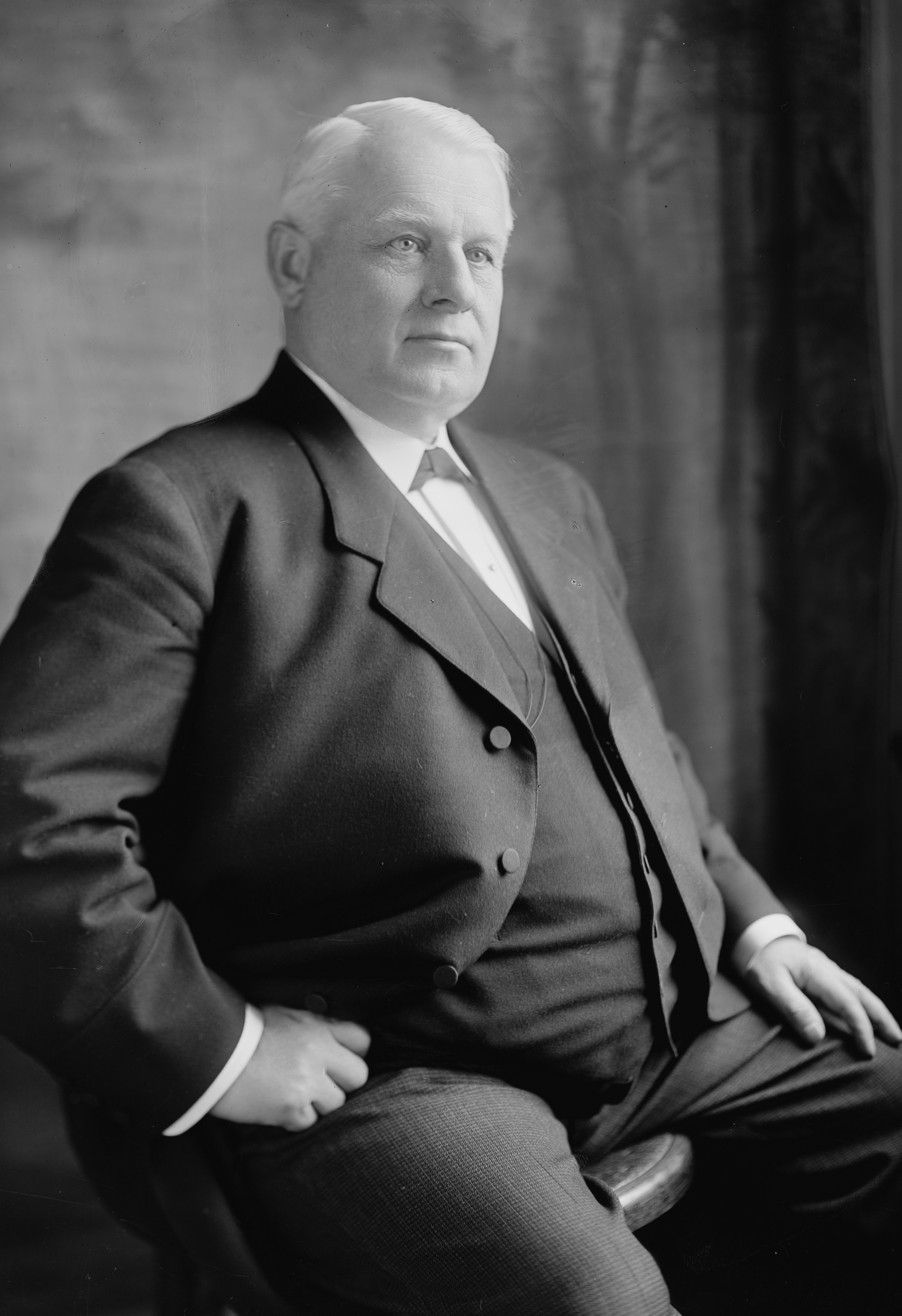
- Martin, 1905–1919

Chairman of the Senate Democratic Caucus
- In office March 4, 1917 – November 12, 1919
- Deputy: J. Hamilton Lewis (1917–1919); Peter G. Gerry (1919)
- Preceded by: John W. Kern
- Succeeded by: Gilbert Hitchcock (acting)
- In office April 1911 – March 4, 1913
- Preceded by: Hernando Money
- Succeeded by: John W. Kern

United States Senator from Virginia
- In office March 4, 1895 – November 12, 1919
- Preceded by: Eppa Hunton
- Succeeded by: Carter Glass

Personal details
- Born: Thomas Staples Martin; July 29, 1847 Scottsville, Virginia, U.S.
- Died: November 12, 1919 (aged 72) Charlottesville, Virginia, U.S.
- Party: Democratic
- Education: Virginia Military Institute; University of Virginia, Charlottesville

Military service
- Allegiance: Confederate States of America
- Branch/service: Infantry
- Years of service: 1864–1865
- Rank: Cadet
- Battles/wars: Valley Campaigns of 1864

Thomas Staples Martin (July 29, 1847 – November 12, 1919) was an American lawyer and Democratic Party politician from Albemarle County, Virginia, who founded a political organization that held power in Virginia for decades (later becoming known as the Byrd Organization) and who personally became a U.S. senator who served for nearly a quarter century and rose to become the majority leader (and later minority leader) before dying in office.

== Early life, education and Confederate career ==
Born in Scottsville, then the largest town on the upper James River to the former Martha Ann Staples (1819–1906), and her husband John Samuel Martin (1815–1867), Thomas Martin was their firstborn son. His father moved from Fluvanna to work in Thomas Staples's store, where he met his wife and eventually became partner. Thomas had two elder sisters and one younger sister in the 1850 census.

In 1853, the growing family moved to "Fairview" a farm outside Scottsville. Thomas would ultimately have eight siblings, including brothers Reuben (b. 1849), Samuel (b. 1851), Leslie (b. 1854) and John (1858–1933). His father also became a local justice of the peace and managed a local woolen mill, before dying on his farm shortly after the American Civil War ended. Young Thomas was educated at home and at local private schools, as was customary for men of his class.

Thomas Martin began attending Virginia Military Institute in March 1864. When the cadet corps was called into Confederate service shortly before the Battle of New Market on May 15, 1864 (in which 10 cadets died), Martin was ill and missed the fight. He recovered and when Union troops burned VMI later in the year, joined his fellow cadets in skirmishes around Lynchburg (a main railroad hub and hospital center where VMI initially relocated) during the Valley Campaigns of 1864 and in defending the Confederate capitol at Richmond.

After General Lee's surrender at Appomattox Court House, Martin returned home, but that fall began studies at the University of Virginia. He became a member of the Phi Kappa Sigma fraternity, but withdrew after two years because his father's death forced him to take charge of the store and mill and support the family. Martin would later remain connected with the university and served a term on UVa's Board of Visitors, but in the short run read law at night.

== Career ==
Martin was admitted to the Virginia bar in 1869 and built a successful practice in Scottsville (once the Albemarle County seat) and surrounding counties. He became known for his expertise with land records, as well as ability to settle problems out of court. In the early 1880s, he became the district counsel for the Chesapeake and Ohio Railway, which had bought several of the railroads destroyed in the Civil War, and which were being rebuilt.

Martin became a protege of John S. Barbour Jr., a veteran lawyer who had been president of the Orange and Alexandria Railroad before the war and a politician and U.S. Congressman like his father (John S. Barbour). Barbour had become affiliated with the C&O Railroad after it bought the Orange and Alexandria after the war. As well as expanding the C&O, he (with Martin's behind the scenes help) also orchestrated the rise of the state's Democratic Party at the expense of the Readjuster Party, a coalition of Republicans and African Americans. In 1885, Martin secured a spot on the state Democratic state central committee, the year that the Democrats secured election of former Confederate general Fitzhugh Lee as governor. Two years later, Martin successfully promoted the Senate candidacy of John W. Daniel of Lynchburg, to replace Readjuster William Mahone (another former Confederate general), although Barbour wanted the seat. In 1889, when the Readjuster Party's other leader, Senator Harrison H. Riddleberger chose not to run for re-election (he would die the following year), Barbour won the seat and became a U.S. Senator. Democrats again controlled both Virginia Senate seats, as well as the governorship, as they had before the war. When Barbour died in office in 1892, after just 3 years as a U.S. Senator, the organization that he and Martin had nurtured initially allowed former CSA General (and Virginia lawyer and Congressman) Eppa Hunton to succeed him. However, Hunton became embroiled in scandal, and the Panic of 1893 led to a recession.

Assisted by campaign contributions from the C&O and other railroads (made more important because of the economic recession, as would be revealed during the 1911 campaign), and with the assistance of Congressmen Henry D. Flood and Claude Swanson (who later became Governor) as well as elected officials in many of Virginia's counties, Martin secured 66 votes in the Democratic legislative caucus (compared to 55 votes for Fitzhugh Lee, who gave speeches throughout the Commonwealth but proved lethargic in securing legislative support). Thus, despite relatively poor oratorical skills, Martin upset the favorite in December 1893, and the following year formally secured election to the U.S. Senate, helped by his new marriage.

Re-elected several times (first through the legislature and later by voters after the seat became subject to direct election), Martin represented Virginia in the United States Senate for nearly twenty-five years. In 1899, Martin faced Governor James Hoge Tyler (a fellow Democrat whom he had supported as Lieutenant Governor and Governor in 1897), but retained his seat. In 1905, Democrats shifted from the caucus system to a primary, and Governor Andrew J. Montague opposed Martin, as an Independent running on an anti-machine platform, but Martin won anyway, having greatly improved as a public speaker in the intervening years, and reinforcing his political organization by disenfranchising blacks and poor whites by the legislative adoption of the new state constitution in 1902. In 1910, Senator Daniel died, and Martin's ally Claude Swanson succeeded him. In 1911, Martin and Claude Swanson faced an internal Democratic party challenge from Congressman William A. Jones, the main leader of Progressive Democrats, and Carter Glass, but retained their seats by a 2-to-1 margin. Senator Martin ran unopposed for re-election to the Senate in 1918.

Martin and his organization worked to defeat various Progressive forces in their own Democratic party, as well as defeat Progressive Republicans (including President Theodore Roosevelt, who kept a camp in Virginia and noted his Confederate-sympathizing mother and her ancestors). They also worked disenfranchise African-Americans in the state, especially at the Virginia Constitutional Convention of 1902. As shown by the multiple internal challenges, they were less cohesive than the Byrd Organization would be for decades after Martin's death.

Nonetheless, Martin was also pragmatic, which assisted his rise in the Senate Democratic hierarchy. Before the 1911 election, fellow Senate Democrats elected him Minority Leader. He withdrew as a candidate for re-election to that post in 1913, and in 1915 spent most of the campaign season in Albemarle County, since his wife's tuberculosis had worsened (and she died by year's end). Martin first opposed Woodrow Wilson, a former Virginian and Progressive Democrat, but when Wilson was elected (and re-elected), Martin eventually supported parts of Wilson's agenda.

After his wife's death in 1915, Martin devoted himself to Senate business, becoming Majority leader in 1917, and securing the declaration which supported American entry into World War I. However, Republicans regained control of the Senate in 1918, so he became Minority leader. The following year, Martin's health worsened. While he continued with some Senate business and hoped to return to Washington by the fall, he was unable to help Wilson during the peace treaty process.

== Personal life ==
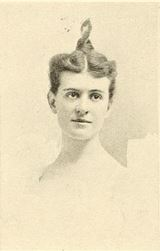
Mrs Thomas S. Martin

In 1894, the long-time bachelor Martin married Lucy Chambliss Day (1875–1915), daughter of Col. C. Fenton Day (1846–1915), former mayor of Smithfield and an important businessman in the Isle of Wight area (owner of one of four peanut factories as well as part owner of the cement factory). The Day family was prominent before the war, her grandfather, William Henry Day (1802–1867), having served in the Virginia Senate immediately before the war).

Lucy Day was a much admired belle of Southside Virginia, as well as at the various watering places where her family spent the summers. Possessing decided literary talent, as well as being an accomplished swimmer and equestrian, she had numerous published poems and prose articles, many admired for their beauty of thought and expression. Mrs. Martin and her sister, Grace Radcliffe Day (who married businessman Henry Gould Ralston in 1910) were society belles in Washington D.C. The Martins had a son, Thomas Martin Jr. and a daughter, Lucy Day Martin (1897–1927). Lucy Day Martin survived both parents, but like her mother, died of tuberculosis.

== Death and legacy ==
The widower Martin did not remarry and died while in office, at his home in Charlottesville. He is buried with his wife and daughter (who died of tuberculosis unmarried) in the University of Virginia Cemetery at that location. Fellow Democrat Carter Glass succeeded to Martin's senate seat; Colorado Senator Charles Spalding Thomas would become the last Confederate veteran in the U.S. Senate.

Martin's home, Faulkner House, was added to the National Register of Historic Places in 1984.

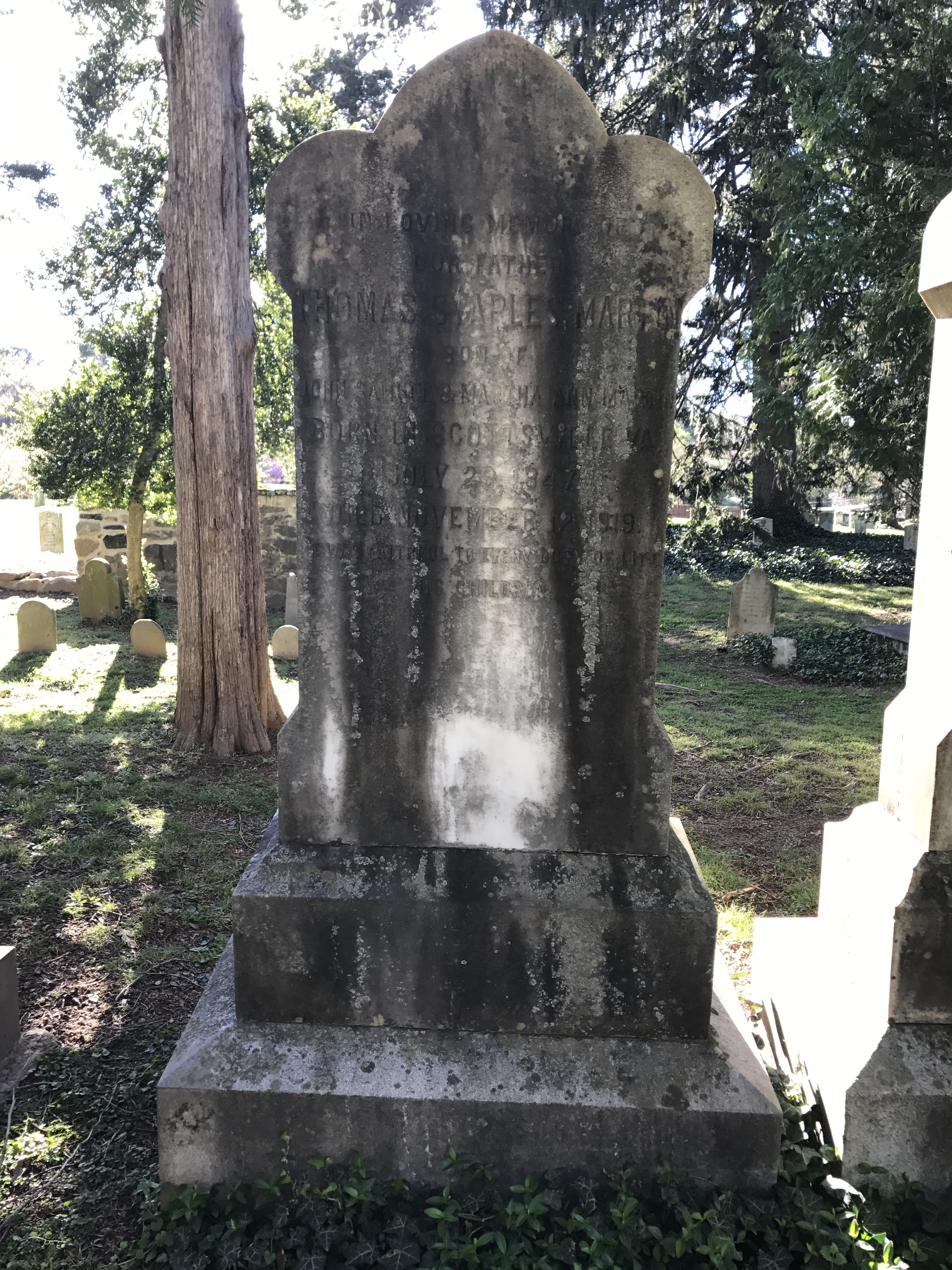
Martin's gravestone at the University of Virginia Cemetery in Charlottesville, Virginia.

== See also ==
- List of members of the United States Congress who died in office (1900–1949)

U.S. Senate
Preceded by Eppa Hunton	U.S. Senator (Class 2) from Virginia; 1895–1919; Served alongside: John W. Daniel, Claude A. Swanson	Succeeded by Carter Glass
Preceded by Donelson Caffery	Chair of the Senate District of Columbia Corporations Committee; 1901–1907	Succeeded by Hernando Money
Preceded by John W. Daniel	Chair of the Senate Public Health Committee; 1909–1911	Succeeded by Charles Allen Culberson
Preceded by Francis E. Warren	Chair of the Senate Appropriations Committee; 1913–1919	Succeeded by Francis E. Warren
Party political offices
Preceded by Hernando Money	Chair of the Senate Democratic Caucus; 1911–1913	Succeeded by John W. Kern
Preceded by John W. Kern	Chair of the Senate Democratic Caucus; 1917–1919	Succeeded by Gilbert Hitchcock; Acting
First	Democratic nominee for U.S. Senator from Virginia (Class 2); 1918	Succeeded by Carter Glass
