= Joseph L. Hoffmann =

American professor of law

- Citizenship: American
- Education: Harvard College, University of Washington School of Law
- Occupation: Law professor
- Known for: Criminal procedure and death penalty scholar

Joseph L. Hoffmann is a leading scholar of criminal procedure and the death penalty, and a professor of law. As of 2022, Hoffmann teaches at the Maurer School of Law in Indiana.

== Education and clerkships ==
Hoffmann graduated from Harvard College in 1978, where he was the manager for the basketball team. In 1984, he graduated from the University of Washington School of Law, where he was Note Editor of the Washington Law Review and elected to the Order of the Coif.

He served as law clerk to Judge Phyllis A. Kravitch of the U.S. Court of Appeals for the Eleventh Circuit. He then clerked for Associate Justice William H. Rehnquist of the U.S. Supreme Court from 1985 to 1986.

== Teaching career ==
In 1986, Hoffmann joined the faculty as assistant professor of the Indiana University Maurer School of Law. In 1992, he became a professor, and in 2000 was named the Harry Pratter Professor of Law. An expert in criminal procedure and the death penalty, he co-authored a report for Massachusetts Governor Mitt Romney's Council on Capital Punishment.

== Selected publications ==
- With King, Nancy J. (2011). Habeas for the 21st Century: Uses, Abuses and the Future of the Great Writ. University of Chicago Press.
- With King, Nancy J. (2009). Rethinking the Federal Role in State Criminal Justice. 84 N.Y.U. L. Rev. 791.
- (2005). Protecting the Innocent: The Massachusetts Governor's Council Report. 95 J. of Crim. L. & Criminology 561.

== See also ==
- List of law clerks for the ninth seat of the Supreme Court of the United States
