= Beard v. Kindler =

- Supreme Court of the United States

Argued November 2, 2009 Decided December 8, 2009
- Full case name: Jeffrey A. Beard, Secretary, Pennsylvania Department of Corrections, et al., Petitioners v. Joseph J. Kindler
- Docket no.: 08-992
- Citations: 558 U.S. 53 (more) 130 S. Ct. 612; 175 L. Ed. 2d 417

Holding
- A state procedural rule that is enforced by the state courts cannot be reviewed in federal court.

Court membership
- Chief Justice John Roberts Associate Justices John P. Stevens · Antonin Scalia; Anthony Kennedy · Clarence Thomas; Ruth Bader Ginsburg · Stephen Breyer; Samuel Alito · Sonia Sotomayor

Case opinions
- Majority: Roberts, joined by Stevens, Scalia, Kennedy, Thomas, Ginsburg, Breyer, Sotomayor
- Concurrence: Kennedy, joined by Thomas
- Alito took no part in the consideration or decision of the case.

Beard v. Kindler, 558 U.S. 53 (2009), is a United States Supreme Court case that deals with the federal review of state laws, known as the adequate and independent state ground doctrine.

== Background ==
Joseph Kindler was convicted of murder in the state of Pennsylvania, and the jury recommended death. Kindler then challenged his conviction and sentence, but before the trial court could consider his motions Kindler escaped and fled to Canada. The court in Pennsylvania dismissed his post-verdict motions because of his flight. Canadian authorities ultimately captured Kindler, but pending his extradition to the United States he escaped again, evading capture for more than two years. Eventually, however, he was captured and extradited to the United States after his extradition was held to be valid in Kindler v Canada (Minister of Justice).

Upon his return, Kindler unsuccessfully sought reinstatement of his post-verdict motions. The Supreme Court of Pennsylvania affirmed the trial court's refusal to consider the merits of the motions under Pennsylvania's fugitive forfeiture doctrine.

After the Supreme Court of Pennsylvania denied relief, Kindler sought federal habeas corpus review. In 1999, a United States district court held that the state procedural ground for dismissing his appeal was inadequate and vacated his death sentence. The United States Court of Appeals for the Third Circuit affirmed, reasoning that because Pennsylvania law gave courts discretion to reinstate post-verdict motions after a fugitive's recapture, the denial of reinstatement did not rest on a firmly established state procedural rule and therefore could not constitute an adequate and independent state ground.

Pennsylvania petitioned the Supreme Court for certiorari.

== Legal background ==
Under the adequate and independent state ground doctrine federal courts, as a matter of comity, generally will not review a state court judgment that rests on an adequate and independent ground of state law. A state procedural ground is adequate only if it is firmly established and regularly followed. If a state court relies on an arbitrary or inconsistently applied procedural rule, the ground is inadequate and a federal habeas court may review the federal claim. The adequacy standard, however, has generally not been difficult for states to satisfy, and state procedural grounds typically foreclose federal habeas review with few exceptions.

The Supreme Court articulated the modern formulation of the doctrine in Coleman v. Thompson (1991), holding that a federal habeas court will not review a claim rejected by a state court “if the decision of [the state] court rests on a state law ground that is independent of the federal question and adequate to support the judgment.”

In Beard v. Kindler, the issue was whether Pennsylvania's fugitive forfeiture doctrine constituted an adequate state procedural ground even though state courts retained discretion in applying it.

== Supreme Court ==
The Supreme Court held that a discretionary state procedural rule may be adequate to foreclose federal habeas review, even though its application may vary from case to case.

=== Arguments ===
Pennsylvania argued that judicial discretion is an essential feature of state criminal procedure. Supported by twenty-five states as amici, Pennsylvania also argued that requiring a stricter standard would weaken the finality of state criminal judgments and increase unnecessary federal habeas litigation.

Kindler argued that Pennsylvania's fugitive-forfeiture rule was not firmly established and regularly followed, as required by James v. Kentucky (1984). He maintained that a discretionary rule is adequate only if it is guided by clear standards and applied consistently. According to Kindler, the Pennsylvania Supreme Court departed from that practice by dismissing his appeal while reaching the merits in similar cases, including that of his escape companion.

=== Opinion of the Court ===
The Court ruled in favor of Pennsylvania, with Chief Justice Roberts delivering the opinion of the court. Under the adequate and independent state ground doctrine the Supreme Court cannot, as a general rule, review a state court's interpretation of state law. The court held that the discretionary nature of a state rule barring judicial review of an appeal or a claim does not in itself make it inadequate to also bar federal review.

=== Kennedy's concurrence ===
Justice Anthony Kennedy, concurring, emphasized that a fugitive's escape is “an affront to the dignity of [a] court’s proceedings” and that there is no justification for unlawful flight.

== Analysis ==
Scholars have argued that decisions such as Beard v. Kindler, applying the procedural default doctrine established in Wainwright v. Sykes, have contributed to the increasing complexity of federal habeas corpus litigation. They contend that federal courts must resolve threshold questions—including whether a state procedural rule is adequate, independent, firmly established, and regularly followed—before reaching the merits of a constitutional claim. According to these commentators, these procedural inquiries consume substantial judicial resources while often preventing federal review of constitutional claims.

== Subsequent developments ==
On remand for further consideration of the issue, the Third Circuit determined that the state court had applied its fugitive forfeiture rule as though it were mandatory, which had not been the rule at the time of Kindler's escape from prison. It reinstated the grant of habeas relief overturning Kindler's death sentence and he was subsequently resentenced to life without parole.

In Walker v. Martin (2011), the Supreme Court reaffirmed the rule announced in Beard v. Kindler, holding that a discretionary state procedural rule may constitute an adequate state ground barring federal habeas review if it is firmly established and regularly followed. The Court upheld California's timeliness rule for state habeas petitions, concluding that the rule's discretionary application did not render it inadequate to preclude federal review.

== Works cited ==
- Yackle, Larry (2014). "The New Habeas Corpus in Death Penalty Cases". American University Law Review. 63 (6): 1791–1853.
