= Schectman v. Foster =

US Second Circuit Court of Appeals case

Schectman v. Foster, 172 F.2d 339 (1949), was a Second Circuit Court of Appeals by Judge Learned Hand about federal habeas review of criminal convictions by state courts.

== Background ==
Petitioner was convicted of robbery in Kings County, New York in 1938. He filed a habeas petition in 1948 alleging that prosecutors had knowingly obtained a conviction based on perjured testimony. Two robbers had already been identified and convicted for the robbery. Schectman was in custody for an unrelated crime when a witness identified him as a third robber. Schectman petitioned for coram nobis based on an affidavit he obtained of two policeman swearing they had only seen two men and a witness known to the prosecution who identified the two robbers but was not called to testify at Schectman's trial.

== Decision ==
The district court judge concluded that federal habeas did not allow district court judges to review state court judgments. Judge Learned Hand affirmed the denial of habeas corpus: "If the state courts have honestly applied the pertinent doctrines to the best of their ability, they have accorded to an accused his constitutional rights."

Judge Hand said that the burden to prove a denial of due process fell on the applicant even if the state judge does not give a reason for denying relief because "he may have decided that the evidence did not prove" the alleged constitutional violation. In Townsend v. Sain the Supreme Court said that when "relief has been denied in prior state collateral proceedings after a hearing but without opinion, it is often likely that the decision is based upon a procedural issue—that the claim is not collaterally cognizable—and not on the merits."

The judge also weighed the Supreme Court's denial of certiorari. The Supreme Court later said in Brown v. Allen (1953) that denial of certiorari should not be weighed in considering habeas petitions.

== Subsequent developments ==
This case played a central role in Paul Bator's claim that Brown v. Allen marked a sudden divergence from established legal understanding. He asserted that "there can be no doubt that when Brown v. Allen reached the Court in 1952, the central thrust of the law was as Judge Learned Hand described it".

J. Skelly Wright wrote that there was "serious doubt" about Bator's assertion, comparing the Second Circuit decision in Schectman to the Fifth Circuit's decision in Collingsworth v. Mayo: "[I]t remains the duty of the federal court to examine for itself whether in fact and law the due process clause of the Federal Constitution has been violated".

Wright noted that First Circuit Judge Calvert Magruder, concurring in Coggins v. O'Brien (1951), disagreed with the Second Circuit's dictum that federal courts lack the power to reconsider state court rulings.
