= List of United States Supreme Court cases, volume 74 =

Supreme Court of the United States
- Interactive map of Supreme Court of the United States
- 38°53′26″N 77°00′16″W
- Established: March 4, 1789; 236 years ago
- Location: Washington, D.C.
- Coordinates: 38°53′26″N 77°00′16″W
- Composition method: Presidential nomination with Senate confirmation
- Authorised by: Constitution of the United States, Art. III, § 1
- Judge term length: life tenure, subject to impeachment and removal
- Number of positions: 9 (by statute)
- Website: supremecourt.gov

This is a list of cases reported in volume 74 (7 Wall.) of United States Reports, decided by the Supreme Court of the United States in 1869.

== Nominative reports ==
In 1874, the U.S. government created the United States Reports, and retroactively numbered older privately published case reports as part of the new series. As a result, cases appearing in volumes 1–90 of U.S. Reports have dual citation forms; one for the volume number of U.S. Reports, and one for the volume number of the reports named for the relevant reporter of decisions (these are called "nominative reports").

=== John William Wallace ===
Starting with the 66th volume of U.S. Reports, the Reporter of Decisions of the Supreme Court of the United States was John William Wallace. Wallace was Reporter of Decisions from 1863 to 1874, covering volumes 68 through 90 of United States Reports which correspond to volumes 1 through 23 of his Wallace's Reports. As such, the dual form of citation to, for example, Lincoln v. Clafin is 74 U.S. (7 Wall.) 132 (1869).

Wallace's Reports were the final nominative reports for the US Supreme Court; starting with volume 91, cases were identified simply as "(volume #) U.S. (page #) (year)".

== Justices of the Supreme Court at the time of 74 U.S. (7 Wall.) ==
The Supreme Court is established by Article III, Section 1 of the Constitution of the United States, which says: "The judicial Power of the United States, shall be vested in one supreme Court . . .". The size of the Court is not specified; the Constitution leaves it to Congress to set the number of justices. Under the Judiciary Act of 1789 Congress originally fixed the number of justices at six (one chief justice and five associate justices). Since 1789 Congress has varied the size of the Court from six to seven, nine, ten, and back to nine justices (always including one chief justice).

To prevent President Andrew Johnson from appointing any justices, a hostile Congress passed the Judicial Circuits Act of 1866, eliminating three of the 10 seats from the Supreme Court as they became vacant, and so potentially reducing the size of the court to seven justices. The vacancy caused by the death of Justice John Catron in 1865 had not been filled, so after Justice James Moore Wayne died in July 1867 there were eight justices left on the court when the cases in 74 U.S. (7 Wall.) were decided:

Portrait	Justice	Office	Home State	Succeeded	Date confirmed by the Senate (Vote)	Tenure on Supreme Court
	Salmon P. Chase	Chief Justice	Ohio	Roger B. Taney	December 6, 1864 (Acclamation)	December 15, 1864 – May 7, 1873 (Died)
	Samuel Nelson	Associate Justice	New York	Smith Thompson	February 14, 1845 (Acclamation)	February 27, 1845 – November 28, 1872 (Retired)
	Robert Cooper Grier	Associate Justice	Pennsylvania	Henry Baldwin	August 4, 1846 (Acclamation)	August 10, 1846 – January 31, 1870 (Retired)
	Nathan Clifford	Associate Justice	Maine	Benjamin Robbins Curtis	January 12, 1858 (26–23)	January 21, 1858 – July 25, 1881 (Died)
	Noah Haynes Swayne	Associate Justice	Ohio	John McLean	January 24, 1862 (38–1)	January 27, 1862 – January 24, 1881 (Retired)
	Samuel Freeman Miller	Associate Justice	Iowa	Peter Vivian Daniel	July 16, 1862 (Acclamation)	July 21, 1862 – October 13, 1890 (Died)
	David Davis	Associate Justice	Illinois	John Archibald Campbell	December 8, 1862 (Acclamation)	December 10, 1862 – March 4, 1877 (Resigned)
	Stephen Johnson Field	Associate Justice	California	newly created seat	March 10, 1863 (Acclamation)	May 10, 1863 – December 1, 1897 (Retired)

== Notable Cases in 74 U.S. (7 Wall.) ==
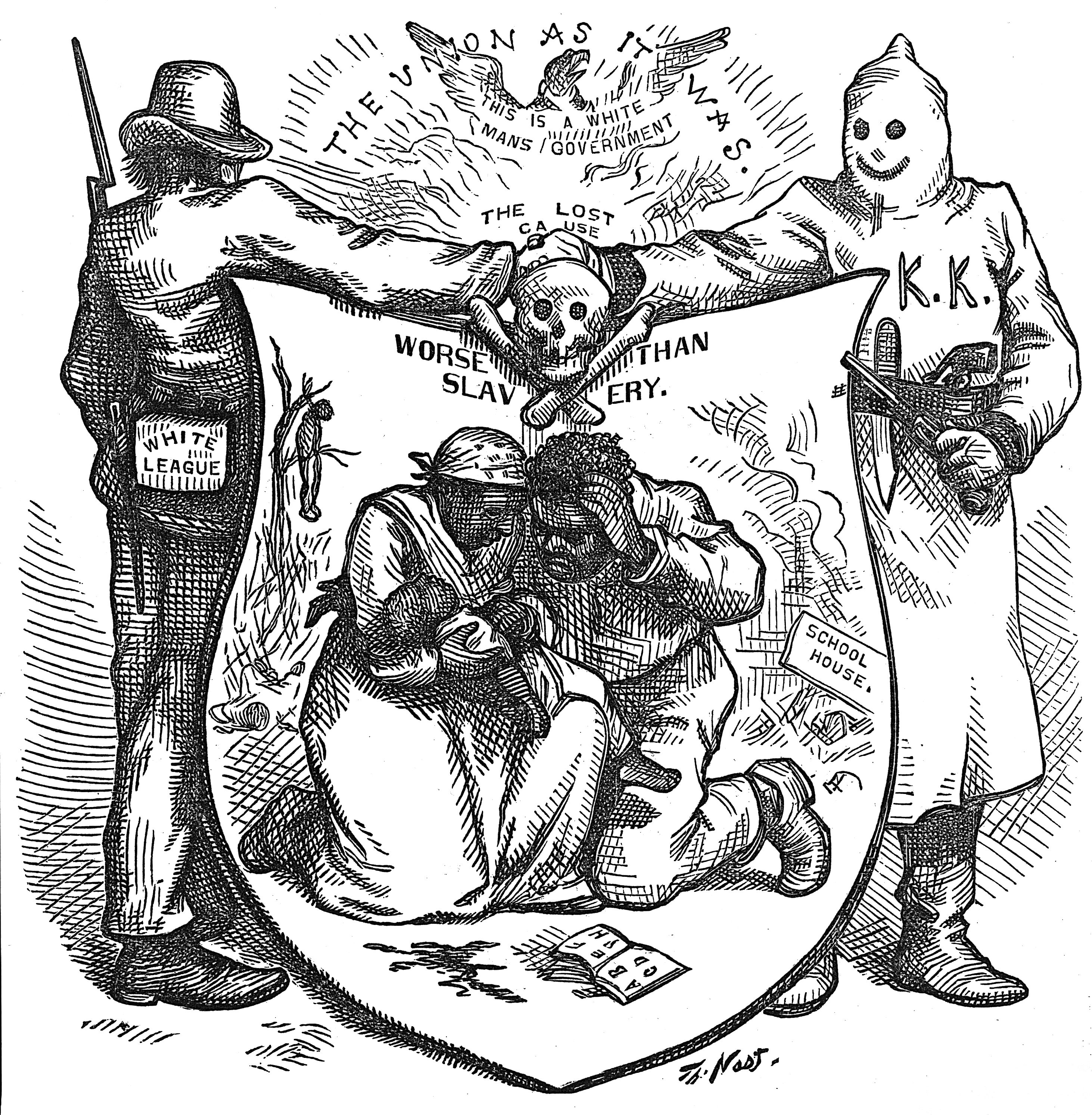
A Reconstruction era Harper's Magazine editorial cartoon by Thomas Nast denouncing KKK and White League murders of innocent Blacks

=== Ex parte McCardle ===
Ex parte McCardle, 74 U.S. (7 Wall.) 506 (1869), arose during the Civil War Reconstruction. Newspaper publisher McCardle circulated "incendiary" articles advocating opposition to the Reconstruction laws enacted by Congress. He was jailed by a military commander under the Military Reconstruction Act of 1867. McCardle pursued a writ of habeas corpus in a Circuit Court in Mississippi, where he was unsuccessful. He appealed to the Supreme Court under the Habeas Corpus Act of 1867, which granted appellate jurisdiction to review denial of habeas corpus petitions. After the case was argued but before an opinion was delivered, Congress suspended the Supreme Court's jurisdiction over the case, exercising powers granted under Article III, section 2 of the US Constitution to limit the appellate jurisdiction of the Supreme Court. The Court validated congressional withdrawal of the Court's jurisdiction, and so McCardle had no recourse by which to challenge his imprisonment in federal court.

=== Texas v. White ===
In Texas v. White, 74 U.S. (7 Wall.) 700 (1869), is one of the most important Supreme Court decisions during the Reconstruction era. It remains influential because of its definition of the legal status of a state and how states relate to each other within the nation. In accepting original jurisdiction under the constitution's jurisdictional grant of state v. state cases, the Court ruled that as a matter of constitutional law Texas had remained a United States state ever since it first joined the Union despite its later joining the insurrectionist Confederate States of America. The Court held that the Constitution did not permit states unilaterally to secede from the Union, and that the ordinances of secession and all acts of legislatures in seceding states intended to give effect to such ordinances were void.

== Citation style ==
Under the Judiciary Act of 1789 the federal court structure at the time comprised District Courts, which had general trial jurisdiction; Circuit Courts, which had mixed trial and appellate (from the US District Courts) jurisdiction; and the United States Supreme Court, which had appellate jurisdiction over the federal District and Circuit courts—and for certain issues over state courts. The Supreme Court also had limited original jurisdiction (i.e., in which cases could be filed directly with the Supreme Court without first having been heard by a lower federal or state court). There were one or more federal District Courts and/or Circuit Courts in each state, territory, or other geographical region.

Bluebook citation style is used for case names, citations, and jurisdictions.

- "C.C.D." = United States Circuit Court for the District of . . .
  - e.g.,"C.C.D.N.J." = United States Circuit Court for the District of New Jersey
- "D." = United States District Court for the District of . . .
  - e.g.,"D. Mass." = United States District Court for the District of Massachusetts
- "E." = Eastern; "M." = Middle; "N." = Northern; "S." = Southern; "W." = Western
  - e.g.,"C.C.S.D.N.Y." = United States Circuit Court for the Southern District of New York
  - e.g.,"M.D. Ala." = United States District Court for the Middle District of Alabama
- "Ct. Cl." = United States Court of Claims
- The abbreviation of a state's name alone indicates the highest appellate court in that state's judiciary at the time.
  - e.g.,"Pa." = Supreme Court of Pennsylvania
  - e.g.,"Me." = Supreme Judicial Court of Maine

== List of cases in 74 U.S. (7 Wall.) ==
Case Name	Page & year	Opinion of the Court	Concurring opinion(s)	Dissenting opinion(s)	Lower Court	Disposition
Girard v. City of Philadelphia	1 (1869)	Grier	none	none	C.C.E.D. Pa.	affirmed
Banks v. City of New York	16 (1869)	Chase	none	none	N.Y.	reversed
Bank of N.Y. v. Supervisors	26 (1869)	Chase	none	none	N.Y.	reversed
The Georgia	32 (1869)	Nelson	none	none	C.C.D. Mass.	affirmed
Mutual Ins. Co. v. Tweed	44 (1869)	Miller	none	none	C.C.E.D. La.	reversed
The China	53 (1869)	Swayne	Clifford	none	C.C.S.D.N.Y.	affirmed
Lane Cnty. v. Oregon	71 (1869)	Chase	none	none	Or.	affirmed
City of Aurora v. West	82 (1869)	Clifford	none	Miller	C.C.D. Ind.	affirmed
Durant v. Essex Cnty.	107 (1869)	Field	none	none	C.C.D. Mass.	affirmed
Kendall v. United States	113 (1869)	Miller	none	none	Ct. Cl.	affirmed
Cowles v. Mercer Cnty.	118 (1869)	Chase	none	none	C.C.N.D. Ill.	affirmed
Nichols v. United States	122 (1869)	Davis	none	none	Ct. Cl.	affirmed
Lincoln v. Claflin	132 (1869)	Field	none	none	C.C.N.D. Ill.	affirmed
Green v. Van Buskirk	139 (1869)	Davis	none	none	N.Y. Sup. Ct.	reversed
The Siren	152 (1869)	Field	none	Nelson	D. Mass.	reversed
Dorsheimer v. United States	166 (1869)	Grier	none	none	Ct. Cl.	affirmed
Lee Cnty. v. Rogers I	175 (1869)	Nelson	none	none	C.C.N.D. Ill.	affirmed
Lee Cnty. v. Rogers II	181 (1869)	Nelson	none	none	C.C.N.D. Ill.	affirmed
Gordon v. United States	188 (1869)	Grier	none	none	Ct. Cl.	affirmed
The Grace Girdler	196 (1869)	Swayne	none	Davis	C.C.S.D.N.Y.	affirmed
Brown v. Pierce	205 (1869)	Clifford	none	none	Sup. Ct. Terr. Neb.	affirmed
Silver v. Ladd	219 (1869)	Miller	none	none	Or.	reversed
Bronson v. Rodes	229 (1869)	Chase	Davis; Swayne	Miller	N.Y.	reversed
Butler v. Horwitz	258 (1869)	Chase	none	Miller	Md. Ct. Com. Pl.	reversed
Northern C. Ry. Co. v. Jackson	262 (1869)	Nelson	none	Clifford	C.C.D. Md.	affirmed
Litchfield v. Dubuque & P.R.R. Co.	270 (1869)	Swayne	none	none	C.C.D. Iowa	reversed
St. Paul & P.R.R. Co. v. Schurmeir	272 (1869)	Clifford	none	none	Minn.	affirmed
Mead v. Ballard	290 (1869)	Miller	none	none	C.C.D. Wis.	affirmed
Jacobs v. Baker	295 (1869)	Grier	none	none	C.C.S.D. Ohio	affirmed
Drury v. Cross	299 (1869)	Davis	none	none	C.C.D. Wis.	reversed
Edmonson v. Bloomshire	306 (1869)	Miller	none	none	C.C.S.D. Ohio	dismissed
Benbow v. City of Iowa City	313 (1869)	Davis	none	none	C.C.D. Iowa	reversed
Boyd v. Moses	316 (1869)	Field	none	none	S.D.N.Y.	affirmed
Twitchell v. Pennsylvania	321 (1869)	Chase	none	none	Pa.	dismissed
Tyler v. City of Boston	327 (1869)	Grier	none	none	C.C.D. Mass.	affirmed
Grant v. United States	331 (1869)	Davis	none	none	Ct. Cl.	affirmed
United States v. Shoemaker	338 (1869)	Nelson	none	none	C.C.E.D. Mich.	reversed
Thomson v. Dean	342 (1869)	Chase	none	none	C.C.D.W. Tenn.	dismissal denied
Gaines v. Thompson	347 (1869)	Miller	none	none	C.C.D.C.	affirmed
The Diana	354 (1869)	Field	none	none	S.D. Fla.	reversed
Kellogg v. United States	361 (1869)	Grier	none	none	Ct. Cl.	affirmed
Ex Parte Bradley	364 (1869)	Nelson	none	Miller	Sup. Ct. D.C.	mandamus granted
Riddlesbarger v. Hartford Ins. Co.	386 (1869)	Field	none	none	C.C.D. Mo.	affirmed
Chicago et al. R.R. Co. v. Howard	392 (1869)	Clifford	none	none	C.C.D. Iowa	affirmed
Sheets v. Selden	416 (1869)	Swayne	none	none	C.C.D. Ind.	affirmed
Payne v. Hook	425 (1869)	Davis	none	none	C.C.D. Mo.	reversed
Pacific Ins. Co. v. Soule	433 (1869)	Swayne	none	none	C.C.D. Cal.	certification
Ward v. Smith	447 (1869)	Field	none	none	C.C.D. Md.	affirmed
Confiscation Cases	454 (1869)	Clifford	none	none	E.D. La.	multiple
United States v. Adams	463 (1869)	Nelson	none	none	Ct. Cl.	reversed
United States v. Kirby	482 (1869)	Field	none	none	C.C.D. Ky.	certification
Mulligan v. Corbins	487 (1869)	Davis	none	none	Ky.	affirmed
United States v. Gilmore	491 (1869)	Swayne	none	none	C.C.D. Neb.	reversed
Kelly v. Owen	496 (1869)	Field	none	none	Sup. Ct. D.C.	affirmed
Ewing v. Howard	499 (1869)	Clifford	none	none	C.C.M.D. Tenn.	affirmed
Ex parte McCardle	506 (1869)	Chase	none	none	C.C.S.D. Miss.	dismissed
Moore v. Marsh	515 (1869)	Clifford	none	none	C.C.W.D. Pa.	reversed
Randall v. Brigham	523 (1869)	Field	none	none	D. Mass.	affirmed
Palmer v. Donner	541 (1869)	Chase	none	none	Cal.	dismissed
Coppell v. Hall	542 (1869)	Swayne	none	none	C.C.E.D. La.	reversed
Cocks v. Izard	559 (1869)	Davis	none	none	C.C.D. La.	reversed
The Grapeshot	563 (1869)	Chase	none	none	C.C.D. La.	dismissal denied
Generes v. Bonnemer	564 (1869)	Miller	none	none	C.C.D. La.	affirmed
Laber v. Cooper	565 (1869)	Swayne	none	none	C.C.N.D. Ill.	affirmed
The Alicia	571 (1869)	Chase	none	none	C.C.S.D. Fla.	appeal improvident
Baltimore & O.R.R. Co. v. Harris	574 (1869)	Chase	none	none	Sup. Ct. D.C.	supersedeas denied
Washington et al. R.R. Co. v. Bradleys	575 (1869)	Chase	none	none	Sup. Ct. D.C.	supersedeas granted
Morris v. United States	578 (1869)	Chase	none	none	M.D. Ala.	reversed
United States v. Rosenburgh	580 (1869)	Chase	none	none	C.C.S.D.N.Y.	dismissed
Agawam W. Co. v. Jordan	583 (1869)	Clifford	none	none	C.C.D. Mass.	affirmed
Morgan v. Town of Beloit I	610 (1869)	Swayne	none	none	C.C.D. Wis.	reversed
Morgan v. Town of Beloit II	613 (1869)	Swayne	none	none	C.C.D. Wis.	reversed
Town of Beloit v. Morgan	619 (1869)	Swayne	none	none	C.C.D. Wis.	affirmed
The Belfast	624 (1869)	Clifford	none	none	Ala.	reversed
White's Bank v. Smith	646 (1869)	Nelson	none	none	C.C.N.D.N.Y.	reversed
The Nichols	656 (1869)	Clifford	none	none	N.D.N.Y.	affirmed
The Floyd Acceptances	666 (1869)	Miller	none	none	Ct. Cl.	affirmed
Whitely v. Swayne	685 (1869)	Nelson	none	none	C.C.S.D. Ohio	affirmed
Garrison v. United States	688 (1869)	Miller	none	none	Ct. Cl.	reversed
James v. Bank of Mobile	692 (1869)	Chase	none	none	C.C.D. La.	dismissal denied
Blitz v. Brown	693 (1869)	Chase	none	none	Sup. Ct. D.C.	dismissed
Washington Cnty. v. Durant	694 (1869)	Chase	none	none	C.C.D. Iowa	dismissed
Austin v. City of Boston	694 (1869)	Swayne	none	none	Mass.	affirmed
Texas v. White	700 (1869)	Chase	none	Grier; Swayne	original	decree for Texas
Roland v. United States	743 (1869)	Davis	none	none	N.D. Cal.	affirmed

== See also ==
certificate of division
