= Coleman v. Thompson =

- Supreme Court of the United States

Argued February 25, 1991 Decided June 24, 1991
- Full case name: Roger Keith Coleman, Petitioner v. Charles E. Thompson, Warden
- Citations: 501 U.S. 722 (more) 111 S.Ct. 2546, 115 L.Ed.2d 640
- Argument: Oral argument

Case history
- Prior: 895 F. 2d 139 (CA4 1990)

Holding
- Coleman's claims presented for the first time in the state habeas proceeding are not subject to review in federal habeas.

Court membership
- Chief Justice William Rehnquist Associate Justices Byron White · Thurgood Marshall; Harry Blackmun · John P. Stevens; Sandra Day O'Connor · Antonin Scalia; Anthony Kennedy · David Souter

Case opinions
- Majority: O'Connor, joined by Rehnquist, White, Scalia, Kennedy, Souter
- Concurrence: White
- Dissent: Blackmun, joined by Marshall, Stevens
- This case overturned a previous ruling or rulings
- Fay v. Noia (1963)

Coleman v. Thompson, 501 U.S. 722 (1991), was a case decided by the Supreme Court of the United States on June 24, 1991. The Court held that the petitioner, Roger Keith Coleman, was barred from raising his claims of federal constitutional violations in a federal habeas court, because he had previously procedurally defaulted these claims in state habeas proceedings. This default had occurred because Coleman's lawyers inadvertently filed their notice of appeal three days later than required by the rules of the Supreme Court of Virginia.

== Background ==
Roger Keith Coleman was convicted of rape and capital murder in Virginia and sentenced to death. He filed a petition for habeas corpus in state court raising new constitutional claims for the first time. The circuit court ruled ruled against him on 4 September 1986. He missed the filing deadline for filing a notice of appeal, but it was dismissed by the state Supreme Court because late filings were barred by the state's procedural rules. The Supreme Court denied certiorari.

He then filed a federal petition in the district court presenting four federal question claims that had already been raised on direct appeal, and seven claims that were raised for the first time in state habeas. The district court said the seven new claims were procedurally defaulted because of the late filing. This decision was affirmed by the United States Court of Appeals for the Fourth Circuit. The appeals court held that federal review of the defaulted claims was barred because Coleman had not followed the state procedural rules to preserve his claims for federal review.

== Prior case law ==
=== Exhaustion: Ex Parte Royall, Darr v. Burford and Rose v. Lundy ===
Rose v. Lundy held in 1982 that federal courts must adhere to the principle of comity, as stated in Darr v. Burford, that federal courts should not hear a claim in habeas until its state remedies have been exhausted because "it would be unseemly in our dual system of government for a federal district court to upset a state court conviction without an opportunity for the state courts to correct a constitutional violation".

=== Independent and adequate state grounds: Michigan v. Long and Harris v. Reed ===
When a state court decision fairly appears to rest primarily on federal law, or be interwoven with the federal law, and when the adequacy and independence of any possible state law ground is not clear from the face of the opinion" there is a conclusive presumption that the decision rests on a federal law ground. This was applied in a habeas context for the first time in Harris v. Reed (1989) for an ineffective assistance of counsel claim. The state supreme court rejected the claim on the merits and did not "clearly and expressly" rely on a state procedural ground. The Supreme Court held that the Long presumption would apply in the habeas context. Coleman argued that his claim was not barred because the Virginia Supreme Court did not "clearly and expressly" state that they were dismissing his appeal on state procedural grounds.

=== Procedural default:Fay v. Noia and Wainwright v. Sykes ===
Daniels v. Allen held that a late filing of a notice of appeal barred federal habeas claims unless there was a good reason, specifically "lack of counsel, incapacity, or some interference by officials". Fay v. Noia clarified that the exhaustion rule was not jurisdictional and replaced more cumbersome restrictions on defaulted claims with the "deliberate bypass rule". Beginning in the 1970s the Supreme Court began to develop the cause and prejudice requirement to overcome "procedural default", implicitly overturning the Fay rule in Wainwright v. Sykes (1977).

== Supreme Court ==
The majority opinion in Coleman v. Thompson was written by Justice Sandra Day O'Connor and joined by five other justices: William Rehnquist, Byron White, Antonin Scalia, Anthony Kennedy, and David Souter. Coleman explicitly overturned the "deliberate bypass" standard the Court had adopted in the 1963 decision in Fay v. Noia, under which federal habeas courts could only dismiss habeas petitions by state prisoners if those prisoners had deliberately avoided raising their claims in state court. In place of the Fay standard, the Coleman majority adopted the "cause and prejudice" standard that the Court had advanced in multiple other decisions since Fay, notably in its 1977 decision in Wainwright v. Sykes. Under this standard, prisoners whose federal constitutional claims were previously procedurally defaulted in state courts are barred from raising them in federal courts unless they could "demonstrate cause for the default and actual prejudice as a result of the alleged violation of federal law, or demonstrate that failure to consider the claims will result in a fundamental miscarriage of justice."

O'Connor's majority opinion began with the sentence "This is a case about federalism", indicating that she placed a high priority on federal courts deferring to state laws and procedures regarding how prisoners can challenge their convictions.

The Court said the independent and adequate state ground doctrine, a principle of direct review, applied on a "somewhat different" basis in collateral federal proceedings, and that it was a jurisdictional bar predicated on federalism as a constitutional principle: "In the habeas context, the application of the independent and adequate state ground doctrine is grounded in concerns of comity and federalism." The exhaustion requirement has been justified on the basis of comity since Darr v. Burford. The Court said the same applied to defaulted claims because "a habeas petitioner who has failed to meet the State's procedural requirements for presenting his federal claims in state court has deprived the state courts of an opportunity to address those claims in the first instance".

Coleman said the late filing was excused by attorney error, but the Coleman majority opinion also asserted that petitioners in federal habeas proceedings must "bear the risk of attorney error", because the constitutional right to effective counsel does not extend to such proceedings, although the Supreme Court has relaxed this rule somewhat in some of its more recent decisions, including Maples v. Thomas.

=== Dissent ===
The dissenting opinion, written by Justice Harry Blackmun, responded to O'Connor's assertion by arguing that federalism "has no inherent normative value: it does not, as the majority appears to assume, blindly protect the interests of States from any incursion by the federal courts. Rather, federalism secures to citizens the liberties that derive from the diffusion of sovereign power." He criticized the majority for "transform[ing] the duty to protect federal rights into a self-fashioned abdication".

== Reactions ==
Shortly after the Supreme Court decided Coleman v. Thompson, The New York Times published an editorial harshly criticizing the decision. The editorial argued that the Court holding that Coleman was unable to challenge his conviction in federal court solely because his attorneys had narrowly missed a filing deadline was "bizarre". The editorial dismissed O'Connor's invocation of federalism as a justification for this decision, writing that "[i]n the name of states' rights, the Court has produced a terrible injustice." The decision was also met with criticism from civil rights activists, who saw it as part of a trend of Rehnquist Court decisions aimed at restricting access to habeas corpus for state prisoners. Congressman Don Edwards was also critical of the decision, saying that "Coleman might very well be innocent, yet the Supreme Court has used this arbitrary rule that he can’t take advantage of habeas corpus just because it wasn’t technically filed correctly".

On May 14, 1992, shortly before Coleman was scheduled to be executed, the New York Times published another editorial criticizing the Supreme Court's decision in Coleman. The editorial claimed that the Supreme Court was "determined to facilitate executions and excessively deferential to dubious state court rulings". On May 18, Time published an issue with Coleman on the cover and the caption "Must This Man Die?" The article, written by Jill Smolowe, argued that "the courts have so far failed Coleman miserably" and criticized the Court's decision in Coleman as part of a pattern whereby the Rehnquist Court was "more concerned with finality than fairness". Coleman was executed on May 20, 1992, after his final appeals were rejected by the Supreme Court in a 7–2 vote, with Justices Blackmun and David Souter dissenting.

In a 2001 article in Salon, journalist Alan Burlow described Coleman as "one of the Court's most criticized death penalty decisions in recent memory". In 2007, law professor Todd Pettys criticized Coleman as part of the court's "overarching, finality-driven reform agenda." He also criticized the Coleman majority for what he felt was its excessive focus on finality, writing that "when procedural requirements are so rigorously enforced that the public is given good cause to believe that courts ascribe greater value to procedural impeccability than to substantive justice, citizens justifiably lose confidence in the integrity of the criminal justice system. At that point, it is only the rhetoric—and not the reality—of finality that has triumphed."

== Subsequent developments ==
In 2006, DNA evidence confirmed that Coleman was guilty of the crimes for which he was executed, despite having insisted that he was innocent up until his execution.
