= Ex parte McCardle =

- Supreme Court of the United States

Argued March 2 – 4, 9, 1868 Decided April 12, 1869
- Full case name: Ex parte McCardle
- Citations: 74 U.S. 506 (more) 7 Wall. 506; 19 L. Ed. 264; 1868 U.S. LEXIS 1028

Case history
- Prior: Appeal from the Circuit Court for the Southern District of Mississippi

Holding
- Congress has the authority to withdraw appellate jurisdiction from the Supreme Court at any time.

Court membership
- Chief Justice Salmon P. Chase Associate Justices Samuel Nelson · Robert C. Grier; Nathan Clifford · Noah H. Swayne; Samuel F. Miller · David Davis; Stephen J. Field

Case opinion
- Majority: Chase, joined by unanimous

Laws applied
- U.S. Const. art. III

Ex parte McCardle, 74 U.S. (7 Wall.) 506 (1869), was a United States Supreme Court decision in which the court held that Congress has the authority to withdraw the Supreme Court's appellate jurisdiction to review decisions of lower courts at any time. As such, the entirety of the court's appellate jurisdiction is determined by federal law.

== Case history ==
During the Reconstruction era, newspaper publisher William McCardle printed some "incendiary" articles advocating opposition to the Reconstruction laws enacted by Congress. He was jailed by a military commander under the Military Reconstruction Act of 1867. McCardle invoked habeas corpus in the Circuit Court of the Southern District of Mississippi. The judge sent him back into custody, finding the military actions legal under Congress' law. He appealed to the Supreme Court under the Habeas Corpus Act of 1867, which granted appellate jurisdiction to review denial of habeas corpus petitions. After the case was argued but before an opinion was delivered, Congress suspended the Supreme Court's jurisdiction over the case, exercising its jurisdiction stripping powers granted under Article III, section 2, clause 2 of the Constitution.

== Issues ==
Two issues were raised by this case: whether the Supreme Court had jurisdiction to hear the case, and if so, whether McCardle's imprisonment violated his Fifth Amendment due process rights. The first question would have to be answered in the affirmative to reach the second at all.

== Holdings ==
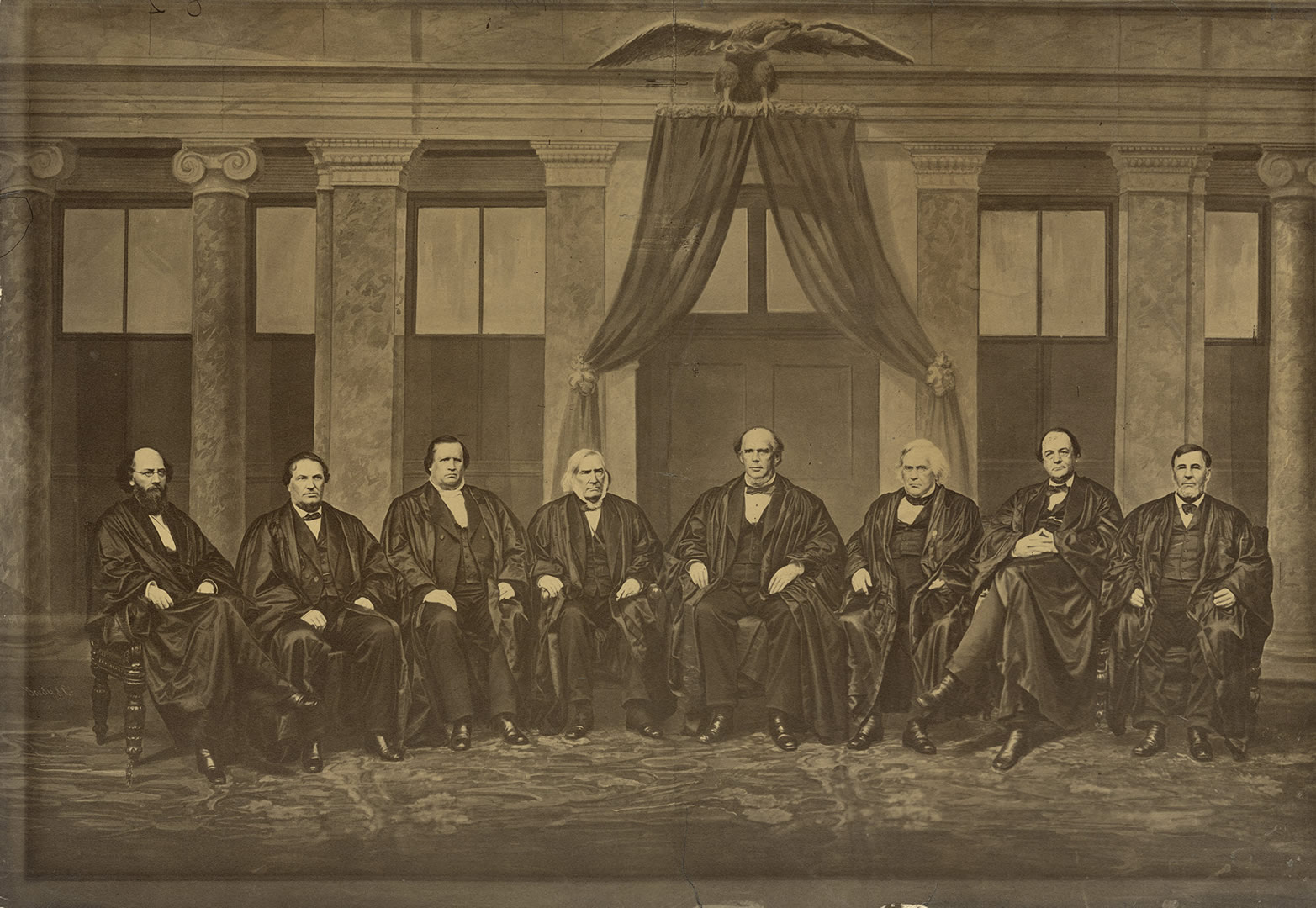
The Chase Court in 1868.

Chief Justice Chase, writing for a unanimous court, validated congressional withdrawal of the Court's jurisdiction. The basis for this repeal was Article III, section 2, clause 2 of the Constitution. The Supreme Court based its rationale in the 1810 Supreme Court case Durousseau v. United States, which had held that Congress's affirmative description of certain judicial powers implied a negation of all other powers. Creating legislation to remove the court's jurisdiction was therefore legitimate under the jurisdiction stripping powers granted by the Constitution. By repealing the act that granted the Supreme Court authority to hear the case, Congress made a clear statement that they were using their Constitutional authority to remove the Supreme Court's jurisdiction, so the court had no choice but to dismiss the case.

Chase, however, also pointedly reminded readers that the 1868 statute repealing jurisdiction "does not affect the jurisdiction which was previously exercised." Since the court had held that it lacked jurisdiction to hear the case, the second question could not be answered and McCardle had no legal recourse to challenge his imprisonment in federal court.

== See also ==
- List of United States Supreme Court cases, volume 74
- List of United States Supreme Court cases
