= Keeney v. Tamayo-Reyes =

- Supreme Court of the United States

Decided May 4, 1992
- Full case name: Keeney v. Tamayo-Reyes
- Citations: 504 U.S. 1 (more)

Holding
- A cause-and-prejudice standard, rather than Fay v. Noia's deliberate bypass standard, is the correct standard for excusing a habeas corpus petitioner's failure to develop a material fact in state-court proceedings.

Court membership
- Chief Justice William Rehnquist Associate Justices Byron White · Harry Blackmun; John P. Stevens · Sandra Day O'Connor; Antonin Scalia · Anthony Kennedy; David Souter · Clarence Thomas

Case opinions
- Majority: White, joined by Rehnquist, Scalia, Souter, Thomas
- Dissent: O'Connor, joined by Blackmun, Stevens, Kennedy
- Dissent: Kennedy
- This case overturned a previous ruling or rulings
- Townsend v. Sain

Keeney v. Tamayo-Reyes, 504 U.S. 1 (1992), was a United States Supreme Court case in which the Court held that a cause-and-prejudice standard, rather than Fay v. Noia's deliberate bypass standard, is the correct standard for excusing a habeas corpus petitioner's failure to develop a material fact in state-court proceedings. This decision increased the deference that federal courts are supposed to give to the record in underlying state court proceedings when evaluating habeas petitions.

== Background ==
In 1984 Tamayo-Reyes, a Cuban immigrant with limited English language proficiency, was charged with murder. An attorney advised him to accept a no contest plea for manslaughter. Tamayo-Reyes received assistance from a translator, but asserted in post-conviction proceedings that he had not understood the plea offer because the translator had not provided an accurate translation. After the state courts dismissed his claim and appeals, Tamayo-Reyes filed a habeas corpus petition in federal court.

Tamayo-Reyes asserted that Townsend v. Sain entitled him to a hearing in federal court for de novo fact development. Townsend made a federal hearing mandatory if facts were not adequately developed in the state court and the negligence was not a deliberate bypass. The District Court determined the failure to develop facts relevant to the federal claim was inexcusable neglect and declined a hearing. The Ninth Circuit Court of Appeals determined a hearing was required. The Supreme Court granted certiorari to decide whether the deliberate bypass standard is the correct standard for excusing a habeas petitioner's failure to develop a material fact in state-court proceedings.

== Supreme Court ==
The majority opinion was written by Justice Byron White, and joined by Antonin Scalia, Clarence Thomas, David Souter and Chief Justice William Rehnquist. Justice Sandra Day O'Connor wrote a dissent, joined by Harry Blackmun, John Paul Stevens and Anthony Kennedy. Justice Kennedy also wrote a separately dissent.

=== Majority decision ===
The Court begins with an overview of cases that undermined and then expressly overturned the deliberate bypass standard, and said newer cases like Sumner v. Mata encouraged full factual development of constitutional claims in state court because it creates friction when federal courts overturn the findings of a state court. In light of these developments, the Court overruled Townsend v. Sain.

=== Dissent ===
The dissent took the position that Townsend v. Sain merely "clarified how the district court should measure the adequacy of state court proceeding". While Townsend was consistent with the Court's earlier cases, Fay v. Noia was not, and it was unnecessary to overrule Townsend simply because Fay was overruled.
