= United States v. Kirby =

- Supreme Court of the United States

Decided December, 1868
- Full case name: United States v. Kirby
- Citations: 74 U.S. 482 (more) 7 Wall. 482; 19 L. Ed. 278; 1868 U.S. LEXIS 1023

Case history
- Prior: On appeal from the Circuit Court for the District of Kentucky

Holding
- All laws must be read as if they contain exceptions to prevent "an absurd consequence". In particular, it is absurd to prosecute a law enforcement officer for "obstructing the mail" because he has arrested a postal worker suspected of a serious crime.

Court membership
- Chief Justice Salmon P. Chase Associate Justices Samuel Nelson · Robert C. Grier; Nathan Clifford · Noah H. Swayne; Samuel F. Miller · David Davis; Stephen J. Field

Case opinion
- Majority: Field, joined by Chase, Nelson, Grier, Clifford, Swayne, Davis
- Miller took no part in the consideration or decision of the case.

United States v. Kirby, 74 U.S. (7 Wall.) 482 (1868), was a case in which the Supreme Court of the United States held that statutes must be constructed reasonably.

== Facts ==
In 1868, Farris, who was a carrier of the mail, was indicted for murder in the Circuit Court of Gallatin County, Kentucky. The state court judge issued a bench warrant to Kirby, the sheriff of Gallatin County, who seized Farris and brought him before the state court.

However, the federal government then obtained an indictment from a grand jury charging Sheriff Kirby with "knowingly and willfully obstructing or retarding the passage of the mail", a federal offense under an Act of March 3, 1825. The question of "whether the arrest of the mail-carrier upon the bench warrant from the Circuit Court of Gallatin County was, in the circumstances, an obstruction of the mail within the meaning of the Act of Congress," was certified to the US Supreme Court.

== Holding ==
Mr. Justice Field, for a unanimous court, answered the certified question in the negative by applying the cardinal rule "that all laws should receive a sensible construction," and that literal interpretations which "lead to injustice, oppression, or an absurd consequence" should be avoided. The Court concluded that "The reason of the law in such cases should prevail over its letter", and therefore ruled that the law could not be applied to the sheriff's actions.

== See also ==
- Letter and spirit of the law
- List of United States Supreme Court cases, volume 74
