= Darr v. Burford =

1950 United States Supreme Court case

- Supreme Court of the United States

Argued December 5, 1949 Decided April 3, 1950
- Full case name: Darr v. Burford
- Citations: 339 U.S. 200 (more) 70 S. Ct. 587; 94 L. Ed. 761

Case history
- Prior: 172 F.2d 668 (2d. Cir. 1949)

Court membership
- Chief Justice Fred M. Vinson Associate Justices Hugo Black · Stanley F. Reed; Felix Frankfurter · William O. Douglas; Robert H. Jackson · Harold H. Burton; Tom C. Clark · Sherman Minton

Case opinions
- Majority: Reed, joined by Vinson, Burton, Clark, Minton
- Dissent: Frankfurter, joined by Black, Jackson
- Dissent: Jackson (note)
- Douglas took no part in the consideration or decision of the case.

Darr v. Burford, 339 U.S. 200 (1950), was a United States Supreme Court case about habeas corpus.

== Background ==
=== Case history ===
Darr was a prisoner at the Oklahoma State Penitentiary. He was tried and sentenced to two consecutive forty year terms for armed bank robbery. He petitioned the Oklahoma Court of Criminal Appeals for habeas corpus, claiming he did not have adequate counsel, could not afford counsel and was not given enough time to prepare an adequate defense. He applied for habeas without appealing the conviction. His habeas petition was denied on the merits.

He then filed in district court without petitioning the United States Supreme Court for certiorari in the state proceeding. The district judge, applying the doctrine of comity based on Ex Parte Hawk, "examined into the merits sufficiently to assure himself that no extraordinary circumstances existed sufficient to justify federal inquiry into the merits...without the exhaustion of all other available remedies".

The Court of Appeals for the 10th Circuit affirmed.

=== Prior case law ===
==== Ex parte Royall (1886) ====
Ex parte Royall held that it was within the jurisdiction of federal district courts to release state prisoners held in violation of their constitutional rights, at least before trial.

==== Ex parte Fonda (1886) ====
The court denied habeas for a prisoner who sought federal relief before exhausting state appeals.

==== White v. Reagan (1877) ====
Required the federal question to be presented to the Supreme Court to be exhausted before the federal district court could hear a habeas petition.

==== Ex parte Hawk (1944) ====
The Hawk doctrine (1944) stated that a petition for certiorari presenting the federal question to the Supreme Court was required to exhaust state remedies before the merits of a habeas petition would be considered.

Ex parte Hawk was codified in the 1948 amendment to § 2254: "This new section is declaratory of existing law as affirmed by the Supreme Court. (See Ex parte Hawk, 1944, 64 S. Ct. 448, 321 U. S. 114, 88 L. Ed. 572.)".

==== Wade v. Mayo (1948) ====
District courts may hear habeas petitions for unexhausted claims when the state judgment was not adjudication of a federal question.

== Opinion of the Court ==
The Court affirmed the 10th Circuit decision:"The sole issue is whether comity calls for review here before a lower federal court may be asked to intervene in state matters. We answer in the affirmative."

If a denial of federal rights is alleged, the Supreme Court must be petitioned for certiorari before habeas relief is sought at the district court, unless "exceptional circumstances" are shown. "Whatever deviation Wade may imply from the established rule will be corrected by this decision", the Court said.

Congress codified the Ex parte Hawk exhaustion rule and authorized district courts to hear habeas claims only when the state process was "ineffective to protect the rights of the prisoner":

As it would be unseemly in our dual system of government for a federal district court to upset a state court conviction without an opportunity to the state courts to correct a constitutional violation, the federal courts sought a means to avoid such collisions. Solution was found in the doctrine of comity between courts, a doctrine which teaches that one court should defer action on causes properly within its jurisdiction until the courts of another sovereignty with concurrent powers, and already cognizant of the litigation, have had an opportunity to pass upon the matter.

The exhaustion rule is said to promote principles of comity and federalism:

Thus comity, which had constrained the lower federal courts to refuse a grant of the Great Writ when remedies in state courts were still open, brought forth the related rule that lower federal courts ordinarily will not allow habeas corpus if the applicant has not exhausted his remedy in this Court by certiorari or appeal from state courts' refusal of relief on collateral attack.

The Court concluded that the "legislative history of § 2254 reveals no suggestion that the draftsmen intended to alter the sense of the term as defined in Hawk".

=== Dissent ===
The dissent was concerned that "denial of certiorari would in practice attain a significance which the Court is unwilling to give it by candid adjudication".

== Subsequent developments ==
Brown v. Allen unambiguously stated that denial of certiorari should not be given weight by district courts considering habeas petitions. Fay v Noia overruled the requirement to petition the Supreme Court for certiorari before habeas.
