= Texas v. White =

- Supreme Court of the United States

Argued February 5, 1869 Decided April 12, 1869
- Full case name: Texas v. White, et al.
- Citations: 74 U.S. 700 (more) 7 Wall. 700; 19 L. Ed. 227; 1868 U.S. LEXIS 1056; 1868 WL 11083

Holding
- Texas (and the rest of the Confederacy) never left the Union during the Civil War, because a state cannot unilaterally secede. US Treasury bond sales by Confederate Texas during the war, originally owned by pre-war Texas, were invalid, and the bonds were therefore still owned by the post-war state.

Court membership
- Chief Justice Salmon P. Chase Associate Justices Samuel Nelson · Robert C. Grier; Nathan Clifford · Noah H. Swayne; Samuel F. Miller · David Davis; Stephen J. Field

Case opinions
- Majority: Chase, joined by Nelson
- Concurrence: Clifford, Davis, Field
- Concur/dissent: Swayne, joined by Miller
- Dissent: Grier

Laws applied
- U.S. Const. art. IV

Texas v. White, 74 U.S. (7 Wall.) 700 (1869), was a case argued before the Supreme Court of the United States in 1869. The case's notable political dispute involved a claim by the Reconstruction era government of Texas that U.S. bonds owned by Texas since 1850 had been illegally sold by the Confederate state legislature during the American Civil War. The state filed suit in the U.S. Supreme Court, given that, under the Constitution, that institution has original jurisdiction on certain cases in which a state is a party.

In accepting original jurisdiction, the court ruled that, legally speaking, Texas was and remained a state of the United States ever since it first joined the Union in 1845, despite it later purporting to join the Confederate States of America and despite it being under military rule at the time of the decision in the case. In deciding the merits of the bond issue, the court further held that the Constitution did not permit states to unilaterally secede from the United States, and that the ordinances of secession, and all the acts of the legislatures within seceding states intended to give effect to such ordinances, were "absolutely null". The purported bond sale during the civil war was thus void and the reconstructed Texas remained the legal owner.

== Background ==
=== Secession and bond sales ===
On February 1, 1861, the Texas secession convention drafted and approved an Ordinance of Secession. This ordinance was subsequently approved by both the state legislature and a statewide referendum. On January 11, 1862, the state legislature approved the creation of a military board to address issues involved in the transition in the shift in loyalty from the United States to the Confederate States.

Texas had received $10 million in United States bonds in settlement of border claims as a part of the Compromise of 1850. While many of the bonds were sold, there were still some unsold in 1861. Needing money, the legislature authorized the sale of the remaining bonds. Existing state law required that the Texas governor sign his endorsement on any bonds that were sold, but the state feared that the sale price would be depressed if the United States Treasury refused to honor bonds sold by a Confederate state. The legislature therefore repealed the requirement for the governor's endorsement in order to hide the origin of the bonds.

Before the bonds were sold, a Texas Unionist notified the Treasury which ran a legal notice in the New York Tribune that it would not honor any bonds from Texas unless they were endorsed by the prewar governor (Sam Houston). Despite the warning, 136 bonds were purchased by a brokerage owned by George W. White and John Chiles. Although this sale probably occurred earlier, the written confirmation of the transaction was not executed until January 12, 1865. The bonds were in the meantime resold to several individuals, one or more of whom were able to successfully redeem the bonds through the United States government.

With the end of the war, President Andrew Johnson appointed a temporary governor, Andrew J. Hamilton, and ordered Texas to create a new state constitution and form a new state government loyal to the Union. James W. Throckmorton was elected governor under this process. Throckmorton was in office for a year before General Philip Sheridan, the military commander of the Military District of the Southwest, dismissed him for being an "impediment to the reconstruction of the State", appointing Elisha M. Pease in his place. Pease was a Republican who had lost to Throckmorton in the election.

As the United States Treasury Department became aware of the situation regarding the bonds, it refused to redeem those bonds sold by White and Chiles. After the state realized that it was no longer in possession of the bonds, it determined that the bonds had been sold illicitly to finance the rebellion against the United States. All three of the governors, in order to regain ownership of the bonds for the state, approved filing a lawsuit under Article III, Section 2 of the United States Constitution which granted original jurisdiction to the Supreme Court in all cases "in which a State shall be a party". The case, filed on February 15, 1867, appeared on the docket as The State of Texas, Compt., v. George W. White, John Chiles, John A. Hardenburg, Samuel Wolf, George W. Stewart, the Branch of the Commercial Bank of Kentucky, Weston F. Birch, Byron Murray, Jr., and Shaw.

John Chiles, who was being sued along with White, argued that he could not be sued because Texas lacked evidence. He claimed the bond documents were destroyed by soldiers and that there was no way to get them back, therefore he should not have to reimburse the state of Texas.

=== Reconstruction politics ===
By the time the suit was filed, the radical faction of Republicans in Congress opposed President Johnson's policy in Reconstruction. Radicals opposed the creation of provisional state governments, and moderates were frustrated by a number of lawsuits instigated by provisional Southern governors attempting to obstruct congressional reconstruction. Increasingly, Republicans were abandoning Lincoln's position that the states had never left the Union, preferring to treat the South as conquered provinces totally subject to Congressional rule. They hoped that the Supreme Court would reject jurisdiction in the case by claiming that there was no legally recognized government in Texas.

Democrats, on the other hand, wanted the Court to acknowledge the existence of an official state government in Texas. Such a ruling would have the effect of accepting Texas as fully restored to its place in the Union and render the Military Reconstruction Act unconstitutional. Wall Street was also concerned with the case, opposing any actions that threatened bondholders and investors.

== Arguments ==
Twelve attorneys represented Texas and the various defendants in the case. Arguments before the Supreme Court were made over three days on February 5, 8 and 9, 1869.

=== State of Texas, plaintiff ===
The complaint filed by Texas claimed ownership of the bonds and requested that the defendants turn the bonds over to the state. Texas's attorneys disputed the legitimacy of the Confederate state legislature that had allowed the bonds to be sold. In response to an issue raised by the defendants, Texas differentiated between those acts of the legislature necessary "to preserve the social community from anarchy and to maintain order" (such as marriages and routine criminal and civil matters) and those "designed to promote the Confederacy or that were in violation of the U.S. Constitution".

Texas argued that it was a well established legal principle that if the original transfer to White and Chiles was invalid, then the subsequent transfers were also invalid. Chiles and White might be liable to such purchasers and any purchasers who had successfully redeemed the bonds were liable for a personal judgment in favor of the state for the amount they received.

=== Defendants ===
The attorneys for Chiles first raised the issue of jurisdiction. They claimed that the section of the Constitution granting the Supreme Court original jurisdiction did not apply. Texas's current situation was not that of a state as contemplated by the Founders, but was that of a territory secured by military conquest. Residents of Texas were subject to military rule and had no representation in Congress and no constitutional rights.

Chiles's attorneys also argued that the sale of the bonds itself, even if conducted by a revolutionary government, was not in violation of the Constitution. Their sale was for the benefit of the people of the state, and the people, simply because they now had a different government, could not decide to invalidate the predecessor government's actions. They rejected the notion that the people of the state and the state itself were legally separate entities. As long as the people had chosen to act through representatives it was irrelevant who those representatives were.

James Mandeville Carlisle, the attorney for Hardenburg, argued that, since his client had purchased his bonds on the open market in New York, he had no way of knowing about any possible questions concerning the validity of his title. Carlisle further stated that the precedents recognizing that the decisions of the "revolutionary" government would be binding on any subsequent governments were "universally admitted in the public law of nations".

White's attorney, P. Phillips, argued that, if the bond sales were invalid, then all actions of the state government during the war were null and void. He stated that "civilized government recognizes the necessity of government at all times". Phillips concluded his presentation by stating that, if, in fact, Texas had acted illegally during the war, then a subsequent government had no right to appeal that illegality to the Supreme Court.

== Decision ==
=== Majority opinion ===
The court delivered its opinion (with five justices supporting and three dissenting) on April 12, 1869. Chief Justice Salmon Chase, a former U.S. Secretary of the Treasury under President Abraham Lincoln, first addressed a procedural issue raised in the original filings claiming that the state lacked the authority to prosecute the case. Chase ruled that the approval by any one of the three governors of the original bill submitted to the court was sufficient to authorize the action.

Chase wrote that the original Union of the colonies had been made in reaction to very real problems faced by the colonists. The first result of these circumstances was the creation of the Articles of Confederation, which established a perpetual union between these states. The Constitution, when implemented, only strengthened and perfected this relationship. Chase wrote:

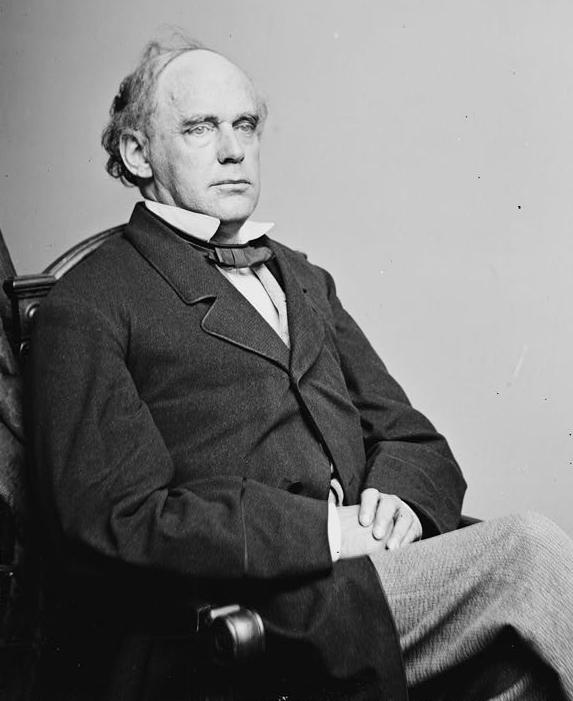
Chief Justice Salmon P. Chase

The Union of the States never was a purely artificial and arbitrary relation. It began among the Colonies, and grew out of common origin, mutual sympathies, kindred principles, similar interests, and geographical relations. It was confirmed and strengthened by the necessities of war, and received definite form and character and sanction from the Articles of Confederation. By these, the Union was solemnly declared to "be perpetual". And when these Articles were found to be inadequate to the exigencies of the country, the Constitution was ordained "to form a more perfect Union". It is difficult to convey the idea of indissoluble unity more clearly than by these words. What can be indissoluble if a perpetual Union, made more perfect, is not?

After establishing the origin of the nation, Chase next addressed Texas's relationship to that Union. He rejected the notion that Texas had merely created a compact with the other states; rather, he said, it had in fact incorporated itself into an existing indissoluble political body. From the decision:

When, therefore, Texas became one of the United States, she entered into an indissoluble relation. All the obligations of perpetual union, and all the guaranties of republican government in the Union, attached at once to the State. The act which consummated her admission into the Union was something more than a compact; it was the incorporation of a new member into the political body. And it was final. The union between Texas and the other States was as complete, as perpetual, and as indissoluble as the union between the original States. There was no place for reconsideration or revocation, except through revolution or through consent of the States.

For these reasons, Texas had never been outside the Union and any state actions taken to declare secession or implement the Ordinance of Secession were null and void. The rights of the state itself, as well as the rights of Texans as citizens of the United States, remained unimpaired. From the decision:

Considered therefore as transactions under the Constitution, the ordinance of secession, adopted by the convention and ratified by a majority of the citizens of Texas, and all the acts of her legislature intended to give effect to that ordinance, were absolutely null. They were utterly without operation in law. The obligations of the State, as a member of the Union, and of every citizen of the State, as a citizen of the United States, remained perfect and unimpaired. It certainly follows that the State did not cease to be a State, nor her citizens to be citizens of the Union. If this were otherwise, the State must have become foreign, and her citizens foreigners. The war must have ceased to be a war for the suppression of rebellion, and must have become a war for conquest and subjugation.

However, the state's suspension of the prewar government did require the United States to put down the rebellion and reestablish the proper relationship between Texas and the federal government. These obligations were created by the Constitution in its grant of the power to suppress insurrections and the responsibility to insure for every state a republican form of government. From the decision:

The authority for the performance of the first had been found in the power to suppress insurrection and carry on war; for the performance of the second, authority was derived from the obligation of the United States to guarantee to every State in the Union a republican form of government. The latter, indeed, in the case of a rebellion which involves the government of a State and for the time excludes the National authority from its limits, seems to be a necessary complement to the former.

Having settled the jurisdiction issue, Chase moved on to the question of who owned title to the bonds. In previous circuit court cases, Chase had recognized the validity of legislative decisions intended solely to maintain peace and order within Southern society. He had recognized the validity of "marriage licenses, market transactions, and other day-to-day acts legally sanctioned by the Confederate state governments." However, he clearly treated actions in furtherance of the war effort in a different light. From the decision:

It is not necessary to attempt any exact definitions within which the acts of such a State government must be treated as valid or invalid. It may be said, perhaps with sufficient accuracy, that acts necessary to peace and good order among citizens, such for example, as acts sanctioning and protecting marriage and the domestic relations, governing the course of descents, regulating the conveyance and transfer of property, real and personal, and providing remedies for injuries to person and estate, and other similar acts, which would be valid if emanating from a lawful government must be regarded in general as valid when proceeding from an actual, though unlawful, government, and that acts in furtherance or support of rebellion against the United States, or intended to defeat the just rights of citizens, and other acts of like nature, must, in general, be regarded as invalid and void.

Chase ruled that the state's relationship with White and Chiles "was therefore treasonable and void". Consequently, he ordered that the current state of Texas retained ownership of the bonds and was entitled either to the return of the bonds or to the payment of a cash equivalent from those who had redeemed the bonds.

=== Dissenting opinion ===
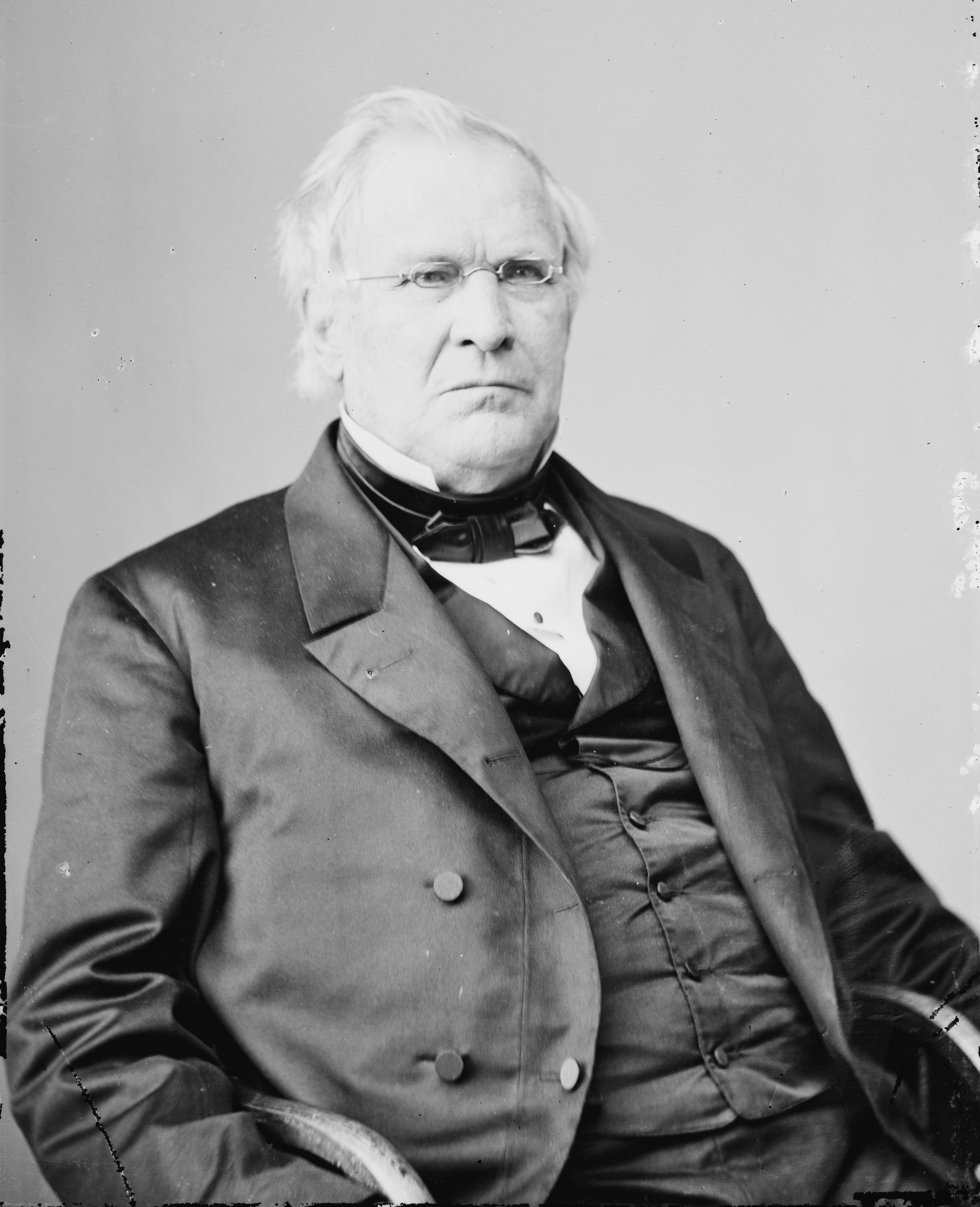
Associate Justice Robert Grier

Justice Robert Grier wrote a dissent in which he stated that he disagreed "on all points raised and decided" by the majority. Grier relied on the case Hepburn v. Ellzey (1805) in which Chief Justice John Marshall had defined a state as an entity entitled to representatives in both Congress and the Electoral College. Thus, Texas's status had become more analogous to an Indian tribe than to a state. He also believed that the issue of Texas statehood was a matter for congressional rather than judicial determination, and he was "not disposed to join in any essay to prove Texas to be a State of the Union when Congress had decided that she is not". Justice Grier said that Texas's claim that she was not a state during the Civil War was the equivalent of making a "plea of insanity" and asking the court to now overrule all her acts "made during the disease". Justices Noah Swayne and Samuel F. Miller also dissented.

The dissenting justices rejected the majority opinion for different reasons. Grier, a "doughface" from Pennsylvania, was opposed to Radical Reconstruction and was primarily concerned with the bondholders. He felt that the Treasury lost any control over the bonds immediately after they were issued. Miller and Swayne were more sympathetic than Chase to the radical position. In a separate dissent they agreed with the majority that the bonds had been sold illegally by the secessionist government, but agreed with Grier that the current state of Texas was not a state within the meaning of the Constitution.

== Reaction ==
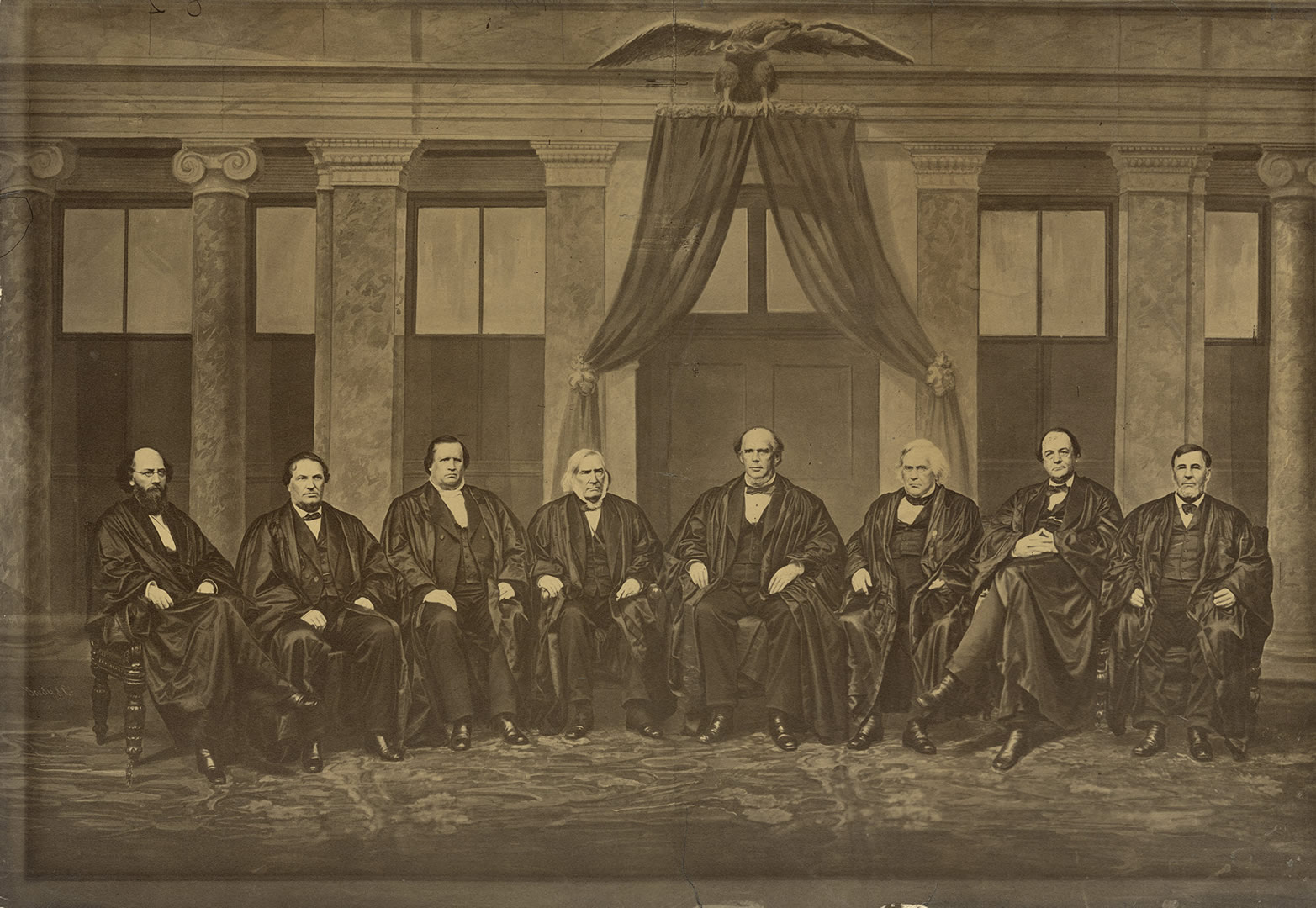
The Chase Court in 1868

The Court's decision, written by Chase, was criticized by both sides. Radical Republicans saw this as evidence that Chase was abandoning a cause he had once enthusiastically supported. Conservatives condemned Chase for a decision that would allow congressional reconstruction to continue.

In December, Illinois Senator Lyman Trumbull, using the Miller–Swayne dissent as his model, introduced legislation to overcome the White decision. Trumbull's bill stated that "under the Constitution, the judicial power of the United States does not embrace political power, or give to judicial tribunals any authority to question the political departments of the Government on political questions". In a direct attack on Chase's position the bill stipulated that "it rests with Congress to decide what Government is the established one in a State, and that it is hereby, in accordance with former legislation, declared that no civil State Government exists in Virginia, Mississippi, or Texas." The legislation was defeated by the more conservative members of Congress.

Aleksandar Pavković and Peter Radan in Creating New States: Theory and Practice of Secession state "'There was no place for reconsideration or revocation, except through revolution or through consent of the States'. Given that the United States was born from revolution, Chase's words echo what had been stated by many legal scholars and politicians of the day, including Abraham Lincoln and Daniel Webster."

== See also ==
- Secession in the United States
- List of United States Supreme Court cases, volume 74
- Reference Re Secession of Quebec – a similar case in Canada regarding unilateral secession
