= Walker v. Martin =

- Supreme Court of the United States

Decided February 23, 2011
- Full case name: Walker v. Martin
- Citations: 562 U.S. 307 (more)

Holding
- A state's rule requiring state habeas petitions to be filed "as promptly as the circumstances allow" constitutes an independent state ground that is adequate to bar habeas relief in federal court.

Court membership
- Chief Justice John Roberts Associate Justices Antonin Scalia · Anthony Kennedy; Clarence Thomas · Ruth Bader Ginsburg; Stephen Breyer · Samuel Alito; Sonia Sotomayor · Elena Kagan

Case opinion
- Majority: Ginsburg, joined by unanimous

Walker v. Martin, 562 U.S. 307 (2011), was a United States Supreme Court case in which the court held that a state's rule requiring state habeas petitions to be filed "as promptly as the circumstances allow" constitutes an independent state ground that is adequate to bar habeas relief in federal court.

== Background ==
Respondent Martin was convicted of murder and robbery and sentenced to life without parole. After the California Supreme Court denied his first state habeas petition, he returned to state court to raise new ineffective-assistance-of-counsel claims nearly five years after his conviction became final. The California Supreme Court denied the petition based on state procedural rules. When Martin later sought federal habeas relief, the District Court initially dismissed the claims as untimely, but the Ninth Circuit Court of Appeals vacated that dismissal, questioning the adequacy of California’s time bar. The District Court reaffirmed the bar as adequate, but the Ninth Circuit again remanded, finding the time bar was not firmly established or consistently applied, and directing consideration of the merits of Martin’s claims.

== Supreme Court ==
Justice Ruth Bader Ginsburg delivered the unanimous opinion holding that California’s timeliness requirement is an independent state-law ground that is adequate to bar federal habeas corpus review. Relying on Beard v. Kindler (2009), the Court held that California’s habeas timeliness rule can constitute an adequate and independent state ground barring federal habeas review. California’s discretionary timeliness rule is adequate under Beard v. Kindler, even though “the appropriate exercise of discretion may permit consideration of a federal claim in some cases but not others".

The California Supreme Court has made clear in a trilogy of cases that habeas petitioners must plead with specificity either the absence of “substantial delay,” good cause for delay, or eligibility for an exception to the timeliness bar. California case law also makes clear that a delay of nearly five years is “substantial,” and the Court rejected the argument that terms like “reasonable time” and “substantial delay” render the rule too vague to be firmly established:

Ordinarily, a state prisoner seeking federal habeas relief must first "exhaus[t] the remedies available in the courts of the State," 28 U.S.C. § 2254(b)(1)(A), thereby affording those courts "the first opportunity to address and correct alleged violations of [the] prisoner's federal rights," Coleman, 501 U.S., at 731, 111 S.Ct. 2546. The adequate and independent state ground doctrine furthers that objective, for without it, "habeas petitioners would be able to avoid the exhaustion requirement by defaulting their federal claims in state court." Id., at 732, 111 S.Ct. 2546. Accordingly, absent showings of "cause" and "prejudice," see Sykes, 433 U.S., at 84-85, 97 S.Ct. 2497, federal habeas relief will be unavailable when (1) "a state court [has] declined to address a prisoner's federal claims because the prisoner had failed to meet a state procedural requirement," and (2) "the state judgment rests on independent and adequate state procedural grounds." Coleman, 501 U.S., at 729-730, 111 S.Ct. 2546.

...

Today's decision, trained on California's timeliness rule for habeas petitions, leaves unaltered this Court's repeated recognition that federal courts must carefully examine state procedural requirements to ensure that they do not operate to discriminate against claims of federal rights.
