= Townsend v. Sain =

- Supreme Court of the United States

Argued February 19, 1962 Decided March 18, 1963
- Full case name: Townsend v. Sain, Sheriff, et al.
- Citations: 372 U.S. 293 (more) 83 S. Ct. 745; 9 L. Ed. 2d 770; 1963 U.S. LEXIS 1941

Holding
- A federal district court is required to hold an evidentiary hearing to determine the facts on a petition for writ of habeas corpus brought on a constitutional question unless the state court which previously considered the question resolved any factual dispute in a full and fair hearing supported by the record.

Court membership
- Chief Justice Earl Warren Associate Justices Hugo Black · William O. Douglas; Tom C. Clark · John M. Harlan II; William J. Brennan Jr. · Potter Stewart; Byron White · Arthur Goldberg

Case opinions
- Majority: Warren, joined by Douglas, Black, Brennan
- Concurrence: Goldberg
- Dissent: Stewart, joined by Clark, Harlan, White
- Overruled by
- Keeney v. Tamayo-Reyes

Townsend v. Sain, 372 U.S. 293 (1963), was a United States Supreme Court case wherein the Court expanded the circumstances in which federal courts should hold evidentiary hearings when presented with petitions for habeas corpus by state prisoners following denial of postconviction relief in state court. The Court held that federal district courts must hold evidentiary hearings if the state court did not resolve all material factual disputes in a full and fair hearing supported by the record.

The case centered around Charles Townsend, who was convicted of a series of murders and robberies and sentenced to death. The issue heard in the Supreme Court centered around a confession Townsend had given while under the influence of an alleged "truth serum". Townsend's attorneys argued that the effects of the truth serum had made the confession inadmissible. Townsend appealed the case by filing a writ of habeas corpus against Sheriff Frank G. Sain of Cook County, Illinois. The case made it to Illinois Supreme Court once, and the Supreme Court twice: first in 1959 and again in 1963. The appeals case however did not revolve around the truth serum, but instead procedural questions surrounding a prisoner's right to an evidentiary hearing during the appeal process.

The court held that Townsend's writ of habeas corpus should not have been summarily denied, and that the lower court should have held an evidentiary hearing to determine the veracity of Townsend's claims. The court repeated its previous decision that coerced confessions were inadmissible, and theorized that a confession via truth serum would thus be inadmissible; the court was careful to avoid saying whether or not Townsend had actually been given a truth serum.

Alongside Fay v. Noia and Sanders v. United States, Townsend is cited as revolutionizing and greatly expanding the use of habeas corpus, leading to it being used as a general purpose appeals tool. However a variety of Supreme Court decisions since then have narrowed its application.

== Background ==
On December 18, 1953, steelworker Jack Boone was robbed and murdered in Chicago. Police arrested Charles Townsend on January 1, 1954. He was charged on the information of Vincent Campbell. Campbell claimed that he saw Townsend near the scene of the attack, but otherwise little physical evidence linked Townsend to the crime. Townsend had been using heroin since age 15. After his arrest he began suffering from symptoms of withdrawal. While in police custody he was attended by a doctor who confirmed that Townsend's symptoms were caused by withdrawal. The doctor gave him two drugs, phenobarbital and hyoscine, a common practice in the 1950s. Afterward he confessed to the murder of Boone. Townsend later alleged that the hyoscine was a "truth serum" and that his confession was made while he was under its influence, thus making it inadmissible.

== Case history ==
The original case went to trial in 1955 in the Circuit Court of Cook County, where Townsend was convicted of murder and sentenced to death. During the trial, the prosecution brought in the confession of Townsend that had been given while in police custody and suffering from withdrawal. Townsend, via his public defender, objected. Outside the presence of the jury, the court held an evidentiary hearing. Townsend claimed that he had been given a truth serum while being questioned by the police. As a result, he argued, any confession gained during the interrogation was inadmissible. The trial judge held an evidentiary hearing but made no findings of fact and did not write an opinion. Townsend was subsequently convicted. The case eventually made it to the Supreme Court of Illinois, which affirmed the conviction.

He filed a federal habeas petition which was dismissed by the district court without an evidentiary hearing. The Seventh Circuit Court of Appeals affirmed. The Supreme Court vacated and remanded in 1959. On remand the Court of Appeals dismissed the petition without holding a hearing finding that "Justice would not be served by ordering a full hearing", and making no other findings other than to say the state court records supported the state court's decision.

The Supreme Court granted certiorari.

== The Supreme Court ==
Two justices were absent when case was first argued in October 1961. The Supreme Court ruled in 1963, after reargument, that the appellate court ought to have given Townsend's claims a proper hearing since the state court had not. The Court remanded the case back to the district court for a new hearing adding:

On the remand it would not, of course, be sufficient for the District Court merely to hear new evidence and to read the state-court record. Where an unresolved factual dispute exists, demeanor evidence is a significant factor in adjudging credibility. And questions of credibility, of course, are basic to resolution of conflicts in testimony. To be sure, the state-court record is competent evidence, and either party may choose to rely solely upon the evidence contained in the record, but the petitioner, and the State, must be given the opportunity to present other testimonial and documentary evidence relevant to the disputed issues.

The 5-4 split stemmed from issues surrounding mandatory de novo hearings of "final" state court judgements.

=== Majority opinion ===
The Court decided that a federal habeas court must conduct a de novo hearing in the following six circumstances:

1. The merits of the factual dispute were not resolved in a state hearing
2. The state court's factual determination is not supported by the record
3. There was not a full and fair hearing because the fact-finding procedure was not adequate
4. There is a substantial allegation of newly discovered evidence
5. The material facts were not adequate developed at the state court hearing
6. The state trier of fact did not afford the habeas applicant a full and fair hearing.

Townsend said the habeas judge has "the power to compel the production of the complete state court record":

A District Court sitting in habeas corpus clearly has the power to compel production of the complete state-court record. Ordinarily such a record—including the transcript of testimony (or if unavailable some adequate substitute, such as a narrative record), the pleadings, court opinions, and other pertinent documents—is indispensable to determining whether the habeas applicant received a full and fair state-court evidentiary hearing resulting in reliable findings. See United States ex rel. Jennings v. Ragan, 358 U. S. 276; Townsend v. Sain, 359 U. S. 64. Of course, if because no record can be obtained the district judge has no way of determining whether a full and fair hearing which resulted in findings of relevant fact was vouchsafed, he must hold one. So also, there may be cases in which it is more convenient for the district judge to hold an evidentiary hearing forthwith rather than compel production of the record. It is clear that he has the power to do so.

The court below held that the trial court's determination of disputed facts was binding on the district court. The Supreme Court said such factual determinations could be relitigated at a federal hearing if the state fact-finding procedure was not adequate for reaching "reasonably correct results":

Even if all the relevant facts were presented in the state-court hearing, it may be that the fact-finding procedure there employed was not adequate for reaching reasonably correct results. If the state trial judge has made serious procedural errors (respecting the claim pressed in federal habeas) in such things as the burden of proof, a federal hearing is required. Even where the procedure employed does not violate the Constitution, if it appears to be seriously inadequate for the ascertainment of the truth, it is the federal judge’s duty to disregard the state findings and take evidence anew.

Additionally the court noted that the medical expert for the prosecution had made a mistake by not noting in layman's terms the fact that hyoscine could possibly act as a truth serum.

The court also confirmed that a confession is inadmissible if it has been coerced from an individual, or if it was "not the product of a rational intellect and a free will". The court thus surmised that a confession taken under the influence of a supposed truth serum would meet those criteria. However the court was careful to avoid actually determining whether the drug in question was in fact a truth serum, or if the confession had been the result of it.

=== Dissent ===
The dissenting minority of the court argued that appeals courts should have greater discretion in hearings, and should not be forced to hold hearings.

== Subsequent developments ==
States wishing to avoid a federal evidentiary hearing after Townsend were required to provide a complete record of a hearing done at trial or at a state post-conviction proceeding. In 1966, Congress amended the judicial code to add §2254(d) creating a presumption of correctness for state court fact-finding when the state court put its findings in writing and met the other statutory requirements that closely tracked the Townsend criteria. This was repealed by the AEDPA's §2254(e) in 1996. The new fact-finding provision preserved the basic presumption in favor of state court findings, but removed language to the effect that petitioner's burden to rebut the presumption arose "in an evidentiary hearing in the proceeding in the Federal court", and only when the state court had provided a written opinion explaining its findings of fact.

The Supreme Court in Keeney v. Tamayo-Reyes (1992) had already overturned part of Townsend that requiring a meaningful opportunity for fact development in cases where counsel had been negligent or incompetent in the state proceedings. Before Keeney, procedural mistakes made by the prisoner's lawyer inadvertently did not disqualify a defendant from a new evidentiary hearing under the Fay v. Noia and Townsend procedures. Keeney established that prisoners must show cause for procedural default, even if the "material facts were not adequateley developed at the state-court hearing".

Keeney was part of an attempt to streamline the overburdened appeals process, since at the time more than 10,000 habeas corpus requests were filed every year, many of which were frivolous, accounting for almost 5% of all civil cases in federal court. The Supreme Court argued that giving a new evidentiary hearing to every prisoner was overkill, and wasted time and valuable court resources. As a result, only cases in which the prisoner was able to show legitimate cause for the procedural default would be entitled to new hearings.

Townsend is discussed in Colorado v. Connelly (which set the modern standard for the voluntariness of confessions). Chief Justice Rehnquist called the actions "police wrongdoing", and insinuated that the police knew about the drug and its effects. Commentators Bloom and Brodin suggest this is a "revisionist reading" since the officers apparently did not know about the administration of drugs to Townsend.

== See also ==
- Habeas corpus in the United States
