= Fay v. Noia =

- Supreme Court of the United States

Argued January 7–8, 1963 Decided March 18, 1963
- Full case name: Edward M. Fay, Warden, et al., Petitioners, v. Charles Noia.
- Citations: 372 U.S. 391 (more) 83 S. Ct. 822, 9 L.Ed.2d 837
- Argument: Oral argument

Case history
- Prior: 300 F.2d 345 (CA2 1962)

Holding
- Federal habeas courts could not deny petitions brought by state prisoners unless that prisoner had deliberately bypassed the orderly procedure of state courts for the adjudication of constitutional claims.

Court membership
- Chief Justice Earl Warren Associate Justices Hugo Black · William O. Douglas; Tom C. Clark · John M. Harlan II; William J. Brennan Jr. · Potter Stewart; Byron White · Arthur Goldberg

Case opinions
- Majority: Brennan, joined by Warren, Black, Douglas, White, Goldberg
- Dissent: Clark
- Dissent: Harlan, joined by Clark, Stewart
- Overruled by
- Coleman v. Thompson (1991)
- This case overturned a previous ruling or rulings
- Darr v. Burford (1950) (in part)

Fay v. Noia, 372 U.S. 391 (1963), was a 1963 United States Supreme Court case concerning habeas corpus. In a majority opinion authored by Justice William J. Brennan, Jr., the Court held that state prisoners were entitled to access to habeas relief in federal court, even if they did not pursue a remedy in state court that was not available to them at the time. Furthermore, the majority in Fay set out the "deliberate bypass" standard, whereby federal habeas courts could not deny petitions brought by state prisoners unless that prisoner had "deliberately bypassed the orderly procedure of state courts" for the adjudication of constitutional claims.

Fay is recognized as one of three highly influential 1963 cases in a "trilogy" of Supreme Court habeas jurisprudence, the other two being Townsend v. Sain and Sanders v. United States. Fay overturned the Court's prior decision in the 1950 case Darr v. Burford "to the extent that it required a state prisoner to seek certiorari in this Court before seeking federal habeas corpus relief." The Supreme Court later partially overruled Fay in its 1977 decision in Wainwright v. Sykes, and fully overruled Fay in its 1991 decision in Coleman v. Thompson.

== Background ==
Charles Noia, Frank Caminito and Santo Bonino were arrested in connection with a murder-robbery. They were subjected to a lengthy interrogation by police without access to counsel. They were convicted based solely on the confession obtained in the course of that interrogation and sentence to life terms in Sing Sing prison. Caminito and Bonino appealed and after several motions and petitions were able to get their convictions vacated. Noia applied for a writ of coram nobis at the sentencing court but did directly appeal. The sentencing court vacated the conviction. The New York Court of Appeals re-instated because of Noia's failure to timely appeal. The Supreme Court denied certiorari.

Noia petitioned the federal district court for a writ of habeas corpus. The district court said Noia had not exhausted state remedies as required by the habeas statute and denied relief. The Court of Appeals for the Second Circuit reversed finding exceptional "circumstances rendering [state] process ineffective to protect the rights of the prisoner". If the denial of coram nobis by the state courts had been decided on an adequate state ground federal habeas courts would not have had jurisdiction to grant relief. The Supreme Court granted certiorari.

== Supreme Court ==
The Supreme Court did not decide whether the state ground was "adequate and independent". They held that the state-ground rule limited federal appellate review, not habeas jurisdiction. Writing for the majority, Justice William Brennan quoted from the Frank v. Mangum dissent stating "habeas corpus cuts through all forms...It comes in from the outside, not in subordination to the proceedings".

Fay reaffirmed Brown v. Allen and in a footnote rejected Paul Bator's influential historical thesis which says Brown represented a sharp departure from the precedent at that time:

The argument has recently been advanced that the Moore decision did not in fact discredit the position advanced by the Court in Frank v. Mangum (that habeas would lie only if the state courts had failed to afford petitioner corrective process), and that this position was first upset in Brown v. Allen.

The argument would seem untenable in light of certain factors: (1) The opinion of the Court in Moore, written by Mr. Justice Holmes, is a virtual paraphrase of his dissenting opinion in Frank. (2) The thesis of the Frank majority finds no support in other decisions of the Court...(3) None of the opinions in Brown v. Allen even remotely suggests that the Court was changing the existing law in allowing coerced confessions and racial discrimination in jury selection to be challenged on habeas notwithstanding state court review of the merits of these constitutional claims.

== Subsequent developments ==
The majority decision in Fay was influenced by Curtis R. Reitz's article Federal Habeas Corpus: Impact of an Abortive State Proceeding. Bator's historical account was rejected but gained acceptance in later decisions. Justice Lewis Powell concurring in Schneckloth v. Bustamonte (1973) said "recent scholarship [had] cast grave doubt on Fay's version." He quoted Bator and emphasized the interest of finality.

The Court narrowed Fay in Wainwright v. Sykes (1977) holding that independent and adequate state grounds restricted federal habeas jurisdiction unless the petitioner could show "cause and prejudice".
