= Wainwright v. Sykes =

- Supreme Court of the United States

Argued March 29, 1977 Decided June 23, 1977
- Full case name: Louie L. Wainwright, Secretary, Florida Department of Offender Rehabilitation, Petitioner, v. John Sykes
- Citations: 433 U.S. 72 (more) 97 S. Ct. 2497, 53 L.Ed.2d 594
- Argument: Oral argument

Case history
- Prior: 528 F.2d 522 (CA5 1976)
- Subsequent: Rehearing denied, 434 U.S. 880, 98 S.Ct. 241.

Holding
- Respondent's failure to make timely objection under the Florida contemporaneous objection rule to the admission of his inculpatory statements, absent a showing of cause for the noncompliance and some showing of actual prejudice, bars federal habeas corpus review of his Miranda claim.

Court membership
- Chief Justice Warren E. Burger Associate Justices William J. Brennan Jr. · Potter Stewart; Byron White · Thurgood Marshall; Harry Blackmun · Lewis F. Powell Jr. William Rehnquist · John P. Stevens

Case opinions
- Majority: Rehnquist, joined by Burger, Stewart, Blackmun, Powell, Stevens
- Concurrence: Burger
- Concurrence: Stevens
- Concurrence: White (in judgment)
- Dissent: Brennan, joined by Marshall

Wainwright v. Sykes, 433 U.S. 72 (1977), was a United States Supreme Court case decided on June 23, 1977. In a 7–2 decision by Associate Justice William Rehnquist, the Court held that, if a state prisoner fails to raise a federal constitutional claim at trial or on appeal in a manner in keeping with the state's requirements, and cause and prejudice for this failure cannot be shown, that claim cannot be subsequently raised in federal habeas corpus proceedings. The majority adopted the "cause" and "prejudice" requirement that had been laid out in the 1976 Supreme Court decision, Francis v. Henderson, rejecting the broader standard the Court had outlined in the 1963 case Fay v. Noia. Sykes has since been recognized as one of multiple Supreme Court cases that limited the scope of its prior decision in Fay v. Noia, which the Court eventually overruled completely in the 1991 case Coleman v. Thompson. However, Sykes did not completely overrule Fay, though some scholars have argued that Sykes narrowed the scope of Fay so much as to effectively overrule it.

== Background ==
On June 5, 1972, John Sykes was convicted of third-degree murder by a jury in the Circuit Court of DeSoto County, Florida. At trial, inculpatory statements made by Sykes to police while in custody after receiving a Miranda warning were admitted into evidence. Sykes' conviction was upheld on appeal, and his attempts to obtain habeas relief in state court were unsuccessful. Neither Sykes nor his lawyer objected to the admissibility of his statements at trial or on appeal on the grounds that Sykes did not understand the Miranda warning he had received. He subsequently filed a petition for a writ of habeas corpus in federal court, specifically the United States District Court for the Middle District of Florida, arguing that he had not understood the Miranda warning he had been given prior to making the admitted statements.

The District Court held that under the Supreme Court's decision in Jackson v. Denno, Sykes was entitled to an evidentiary hearing to determine whether he had understood the Miranda warning he had received, and thus, whether he had deliberately waived his Miranda rights when he made the incriminating statements to police. When the state of Florida appealed, the United States Court of Appeals for the Fifth Circuit affirmed, and the state then appealed that decision to the Supreme Court.

== Opinion ==
On June 23, 1977, the Supreme Court voted 7–2 to reverse the Fifth Circuit. Justice Rehnquist delivered the opinion of the court, which adopted the requirement of "cause" and "prejudice" for excusing failure to comply with procedural rules. The Court had outlined this test in its opinion in Francis v. Henderson, which it had decided in 1976. In embracing this test in Sykes, the court also explicitly rejected the test it had outlined in its decision in Fay v. Noia, a case it had decided in 1963. In the latter decision, the Court had stated that "an intentional relinquishment or abandonment of a known right or privilege" was required before a federal court could bar a defendant from raising a claim they previously failed to raise in state court.

Chief Justice Warren Burger filed a concurring opinion, arguing that the standard outlined in Fay v. Noia "...was never designed for, and is inapplicable to, errors -- even of constitutional dimension -- alleged to have been committed during trial."

Justice John Paul Stevens filed a separate concurring opinion, arguing that, despite the inconsistency between the "cause and prejudice" standard endorsed by the majority in Sykes and the "deliberate bypass" standard outlined in Fay, that the former standard is nevertheless "consistent with the way other federal courts have actually been applying Fay."

Justice Byron White filed an opinion concurring in the judgment, arguing that while the majority was correct in reversing the Fifth Circuit's granting of habeas relief to Sykes, that this was so because the admission of his inculpatory statements at trial represented a "harmless error", as the Supreme Court had previously outlined in Harrington v. California.

Justice William J. Brennan, Jr. filed the only dissenting opinion, in which only Justice Thurgood Marshall joined. Brennan criticized the majority for failing to elaborate on the meaning of "cause" and "prejudice", and for neglecting to elaborate on the proper course of action for federal habeas courts faced with procedural defaults due to ineffective assistance of counsel.
