= Robert Cooper Grier =

United States Supreme Court justice (1794-1870)

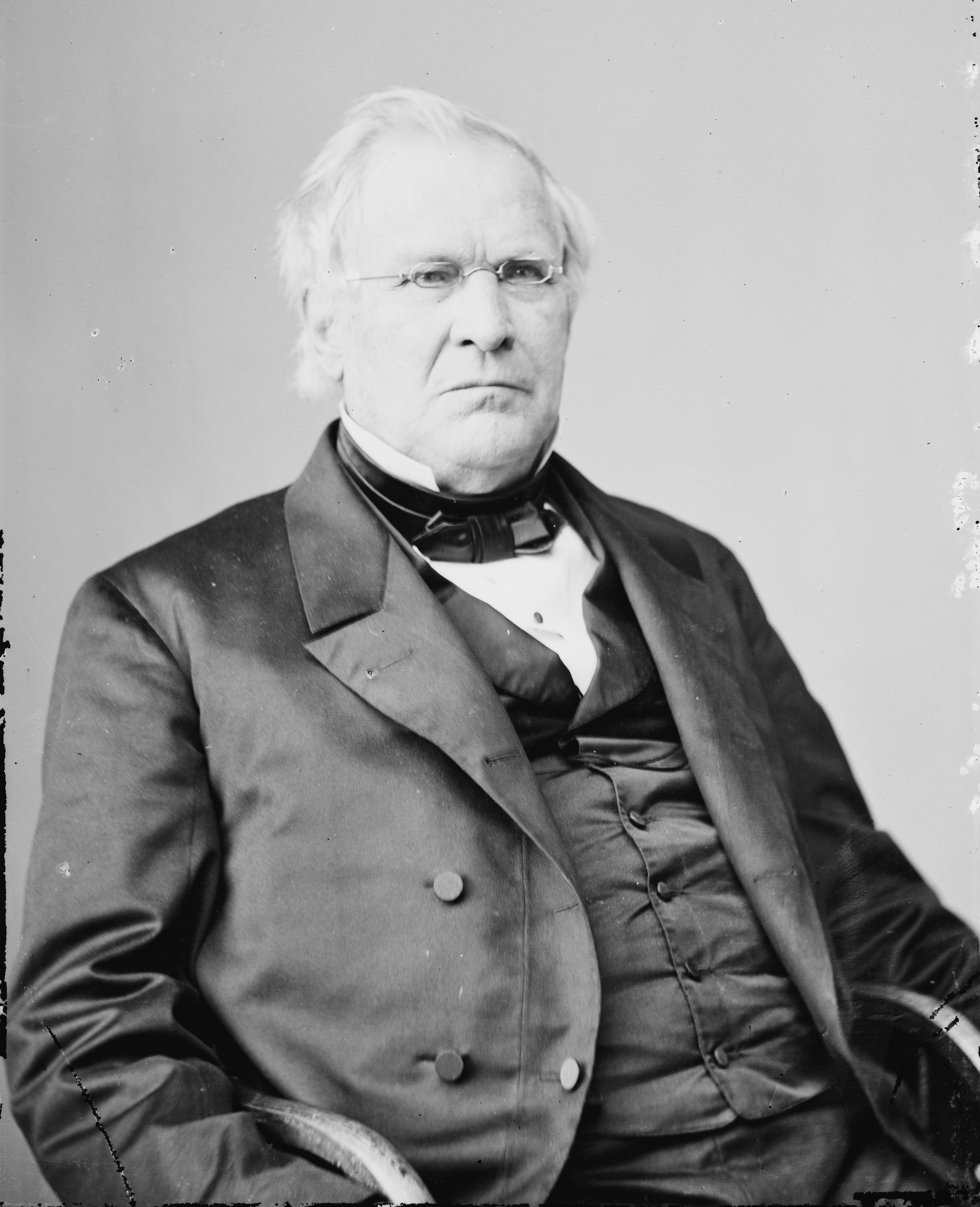
- Grier, c. 1855-1865

Associate Justice of the Supreme Court of the United States
- In office August 10, 1846 – January 31, 1870
- Nominated by: James K. Polk
- Preceded by: Henry Baldwin
- Succeeded by: William Strong

Personal details
- Born: March 5, 1794 Cumberland County, Pennsylvania, U.S.
- Died: September 25, 1870 (aged 76) Philadelphia, Pennsylvania, U.S.
- Resting place: West Laurel Hill Cemetery, Bala Cynwyd, Pennsylvania, U.S.
- Party: Democratic
- Other political affiliations: Jacksonian
- Spouse: Isabelle Rose (m. 1829)
- Children: 6
- Education: Dickinson College (BA)

Robert Cooper Grier (March 5, 1794 – September 25, 1870) was an American judge who served as an Associate Justice of the Supreme Court of the United States from 1846 to 1870.

He was a member of the Taney Court and along with Samuel Nelson, was one of two "doughfaces", or Northern Democrats, on the court that were anti-abolitionists and voted in support of slavery. He concurred with the majority in the Dred Scott v. Sandford decision that the portion of the Missouri Compromise that prohibited slavery north and west of the federal territory was unconstitutional and that Congress had no authority to regulate slavery in the territories. Grier was pressured by President-elect James Buchanan to join the Southern majority in an attempt to prevent the appearance that the decision was made along sectional lines.

Despite his pro-slavery votes, he was opposed to secession of the Confederate States of America. In 1863, Grier wrote the majority opinion in the Prize Cases, that confirmed Abraham Lincoln's presidential power to institute Union blockades of Confederate ports during the American Civil War.

== Early life and education ==
Grier was born March 5, 1794, in Cumberland County, Pennsylvania, the oldest of eleven children to Elizabeth Cooper Grier and Isaac Grier. Both of his parents were members of the Presbyterian clergy. His father tutored him in a classical education and he excelled in Latin and Greek.

In 1806, the family moved to Northumberland, Pennsylvania, where his father managed three churches and a private school. Grier entered Dickinson College in 1811 as a junior and graduated in 1812. He remained there as an instructor until taking a position at a school run by his father. He studied law under his father until his death in 1815. He worked at his father's school as an administrator and teacher and continued his law education under Charles Hall. He was admitted to the bar in 1817.

== Career ==
He practiced law for 15 years, first in Bloomsburg, Pennsylvania, and then Danville, Pennsylvania. He supported his mother and paid for the education of his ten siblings. He was a Jacksonian Democrat and supported Andrew Jackson in his presidential campaign.

A new district court for Allegheny County was opened and there was political maneuvering for appointees. Through a series of backroom deals, Grier was offered the judgeship with the expectation that he would decline. However he accepted the role and moved to Pittsburgh. He served in that role for 13 years and developed an excellent reputation.

In 1848, Grier was elected as a member to the American Philosophical Society.

=== Supreme Court justice ===
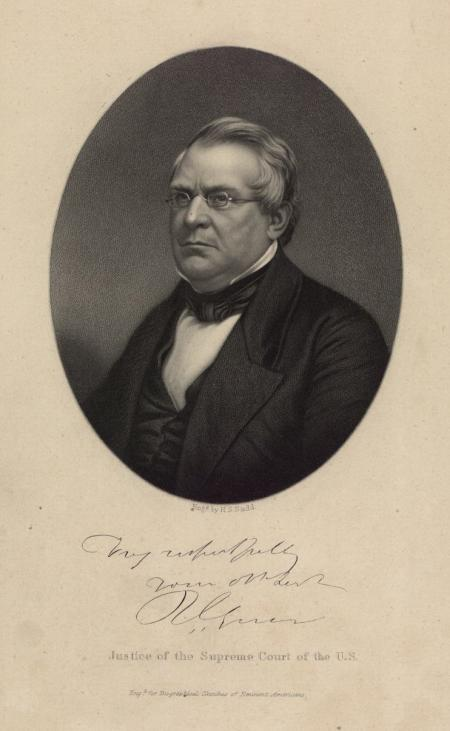
Engraving of Grier while serving as a Supreme Court justice, c. 1850

Supreme Court Justice Henry Baldwin died in April 1844, during the presidency of John Tyler. Tyler attempted to fill the vacancy twice, nominating first Edward King and then John M. Read – both were rejected by the United States Senate. As a result, the seat was still vacant when James K. Polk became president in March 1845.

Polk's first nominee for the seat, George Washington Woodward, was also rejected. Polk approached James Buchannan for consideration to be nominated, but he declined. Four congressmen from the slave state of Maryland recommended to Polk that he select Grier. They wrote that he was one who "acknowledges the right of the master to his slave and will enforce it irrespective of the clogs from time to time attempted to be thrown around by state legislation."

On August 3, 1846, Polk nominated Grier and the Senate unanimously confirmed him the following day. He was sworn into office on August 10, 1846. There had been an 841 day-long gap between the death of Henry Baldwin (April 21, 1844) and Robert Grier's swearing-in, which is the longest vacancy in the history of the U.S. Supreme Court.

Prior to Grier joining the Taney Court, it had been granting increasing power to the states to regulate interstate commerce. Grier was solidly in the middle of the opposing factions of this argument. He sided with the majority in 1849 on the Passenger Cases, that determined a state tax on immigrants was a violation of the commerce power of Congress, and in 1852 on Cooley v. Board of Wardens, which attempted to balance congressional power and state police powers.

=== Economic cases ===
In Cook v. Moffat (1847), William G. Cook of Maryland filed bankruptcy in his home state. He believed that, because he had made this decision under Maryland's insolvency laws, he escaped from all debts, including those that he owed to citizens and companies in other states. John L. Moffat and Joseph Curtis, the respondents in this case, thought otherwise. As citizens of New York, Moffat and Curtis argued that Maryland's bankruptcy laws did not free Cook from his obligations in other states. In his first majority opinion, Grier ruled in favor of Moffat and Curtis, finding that a State shall not "inflict her bankrupt laws on contracts and persons not within her limits." Perhaps more important than what Grier ruled in the case was how he ruled. Citing multiple opinions, Grier remarked that holding in favor of Cook would "overrule every case heretofore decided on this most difficult and intricate subject." To "depart from the safe maxim of stare decisis," said Grier, would be a grave mistake. Grier's respect for the Court's previous rulings constitutes an essential component of his first major opinion.

Grier authored another decisive majority opinion on the question of contracts in Richmond, Fredericksburg, and Potomac Railroad Company v. Louisa Railroad Company (1852). This case revolved around an 1834 charter issued by Virginia to the Richmond, Fredericksburg, and Potomac Railroad Company ("RFP"). The charter granted the RFP sole rights to transport passengers between Richmond and Fredericksburg for a period of thirty years, thus establishing a contract between the company and the state. Nonetheless, Virginia approved a charter to establish the Louisa Railroad Company ("LRC") in 1848. The LRC, which proposed to carry only freight, followed a route similar to that of the RFP. Feeling that its contract had been violated, the RFP filed suit. In a ruling that pays homage to Taney's Charles River Bridge (1837) opinion, Grier concentrated on strict construction of the charter: "Where do we find that the legislature have contracted to part with the power of constructing other railroads," Grier asked, "even between Richmond and Fredericksburg, for carrying coal or other freight?" Plainly answering himself, Grier explained that "such a contract cannot be elicited from the letter or spirit of this act," thus ruling in favor of the LRC. His decision clearly echoed Taney's call for economic progress and promotion of the public good in the Charles River Bridge decision that to deny the Louisa Railroad's rights would be a disservice to the people and businesses of Virginia.

=== Slavery cases ===
Grier was assigned to handle cases out of the Third Circuit which represented his home state of Pennsylvania. Since it bordered the slave state of Maryland, Grier saw several fugitive slave cases. Along with Samuel Nelson, Grier was one of two Northern Democrats on the Taney Court derogatively called "doughfaces". Because the National Democratic party was controlled by Southern Democrats, Nelson and Grier were solid votes to support slavery.

In United States v. Hanway (1851), a Third Circuit Court case, Grier weighted in on the case that arose from the Christiana Riot. Abolitionists were charged with treason after the murder of Edward Gorsuch, a slave owner from Maryland, who lead a raid on a home in Pennsylvania to capture an escaped slave. Despite Grier's support of slavery, he ruled that the federal charges had gone too far in charging the abolitionists with treason. In his instructions to the jury, Grier described the abolitions as "infuriated fanatics and unprincipled demagogues" that were known to "promulgate doctrines subversive of all morality and all government". His view of abolitionists angered those in his home state and all through the United States.

The justice also carried this philosophy toward abolitionists outside the courtroom. When a Presbyterian preacher announced an upcoming abolitionist meeting during Sunday morning service, Grier stood to protest the message, declaring that all good Christians must reject the abolitionist cause. Grier reaffirmed these beliefs in his majority opinion in Moore v. Illinois (1852), upholding an Illinois law that punished any citizen who hid runaway slaves.

==== Dred Scott decision ====
In 1857, Grier played a significant role in the controversial Dred Scott v. Sandford decision. The court appeared ready to side with Dred Scott, an enslaved person from Missouri, who claimed his freedom after travelling to a free territory. Based on the premise that he had resided in the Missouri Compromise-established free territory of Wisconsin (present-day Minnesota) with his owner, army surgeon Dr. John Emerson. Upon Dr. Emerson's death in 1843, his wife Irene Emerson inherited ownership of Dred Scott. Four years later, Scott sued Mrs. Emerson for his freedom, and a local court ruled in his favor. The Missouri Supreme Court, however, repealed the lower court's decision, reversing over two decades of precedent. After this decision, Scott's ownership transferred to Irene Emerson's brother, John Sandford. Scott then sued Sandford for his freedom. By suing Sandford, a citizen of New York, Scott enabled the Supreme Court to become involved, as this constituted a suit between people of different states.

In a separate opinion, Grier provided a half-page concurrence with the majority opinion delivered by Chief Justice Roger B. Taney. The majority decision was that the portion of the Missouri Compromise that prohibited slavery north and west of the federal territory of Missouri was ruled unconstitutional. The ruling also deemed that Congress had no authority to regulate slavery in the territories. Taney stated that, based on the language of the Constitution and the founders' feelings toward African Americans, the Court did not consider Dred Scott to be an American citizen, thus restricting his right to sue in federal court. For practical purposes, Taney could have ended his opinion at this point. He pushed further, though, invalidating the Missouri Compromise under which Scott declared his freedom. Justice Grier initially discouraged such a broad ruling, claiming that the Court should restrict itself after ruling on Scott's status as a non-citizen. Wanting to change his peer's mind, Justice John Catron wrote to President-elect James Buchanan and asked him to lobby Grier for a broader opinion. Buchanan agreed, and exchanged a series of letters with Grier, persuading the justice in an attempt to prevent the appearance that the decision was made along sectional lines.

In his separate opinion, Justice Grier wrote that he "concurr[ed] with the opinion of the court as delivered by the Chief Justice that the act of Congress of 6th March, 1820 [the Missouri Compromise], is unconstitutional and void and that, assuming the facts as stated in the opinion, the plaintiff cannot sue as a citizen of Missouri in the courts of the United States." Breaching separation of powers and siding with the majority, the Dred Scott case struck a blow to Justice Grier's historical reputation.

Grier leaked the decision of the Dred Scott case early to President-elect James Buchanan. In his inaugural address, Buchanan declared that the issue of slavery in the territories would be "speedily and finally settled" by the Supreme Court. According to historian Paul Finkelman:

Buchanan already knew what the Court was going to decide. In a major breach of Court etiquette, Justice Grier, who, like Buchanan, was from Pennsylvania, had kept the President-elect fully informed about the progress of the case and the internal debates within the Court. When Buchanan urged the nation to support the decision, he already knew what Taney would say. Republican suspicions of impropriety turned out to be fully justified.

=== Conduct investigation ===
In 1854, the United States House of Representatives' Judiciary Committee conducted an investigation of Grier's conduct in connection with a series of decisions regarding the Wheeling Suspension Bridge in Wheeling, Virginia. Grier decided for the state of Pennsylvania that the bridge interfered with interstate commerce by blocking boat traffic from Pittsburgh. Allegations were that Grier solicited a bribe in order to rule in favor of one of the parties, ignored the law in making his ruling, and leaked the Court's decision early in order to favor one of the parties (who was considering dismissal of the case). Ultimately, the House Judiciary Committee issued a report dismissing the allegations leveled against Grier, stating that Grier "is entirely and absolutely exonerated and freed from the charges preferred against him. There is absolutely nothing which can or will impair his reputation as a judge or an upright and honest man." Nonetheless, the committee's report is intriguing because it was authored by Hendrick B. Wright, who was a fellow Dickinson alumnus and defeated for reelection in the next Congress, indications of probable bias in the justice's favor.

=== American Civil War and Reconstruction ===
During the American Civil War, Grier was a proponent for preservation of the Union and felt strongly that the rebellion needed to be squashed. He was visiting his son in law in Frankfort, Kentucky, when the first shots of the war were fired at Fort Sumter. He lamented in a letter that his son in law was a secessionist "as insane as the others". He agreed with President Lincoln and refused to recognize the Confederate government as legitimate. He ruled that captured Confederates should be charged as traitors rather than citizens of another nation.

He discontinued circuit riding in 1862, and in 1863 wrote the opinion on the Prize Cases, which declared that Lincoln's blockade of Southern ports was constitutional. In the moments leading up to the Civil War, President Lincoln refused to ask Congress to officially declare war. Doing so, Lincoln believed, would recognize the Confederate States of America as an independent nation and imply the dissolution of the Union. As Commander in Chief, Lincoln acted as if war had been declared, though, issuing blockades of Southern ports that helped to cripple the Southern cause. Opponents of Lincoln's maneuvers saw the blockades as pure piracy, since there had been no official call for war. Supporters argued for war in fact, not in words, and justified the blockading and capturing of Southern vessels.

Grier was a strong supporter of the Union. In his majority opinion, Grier supported Lincoln. "A civil war is never solemnly declared: it becomes such by its accidents." Though Congress did not proclaim a state of war existed, thought Grier, "its actual existence is a fact in our domestic history which the Court is bound to notice and to know." Thus, by citing the power that the Constitution confers on the president to use the military to protect the Union, Grier upheld Lincoln's tactics.

After the completion of the war, Grier opposed reconstruction. In the Ex parte Milligan case, Grier sided with the extreme opinion of David Davis and leaked the vote to Attorney General Orville Browning. In Cummings v. Missouri and Ex parte Garland, he voted against test oaths. He was against the delay to decide Ex parte McCardle which allowed Congress time to remove the jurisdiction of the court. He argued in Texas v. White that the Republic of Texas was not a state politically.

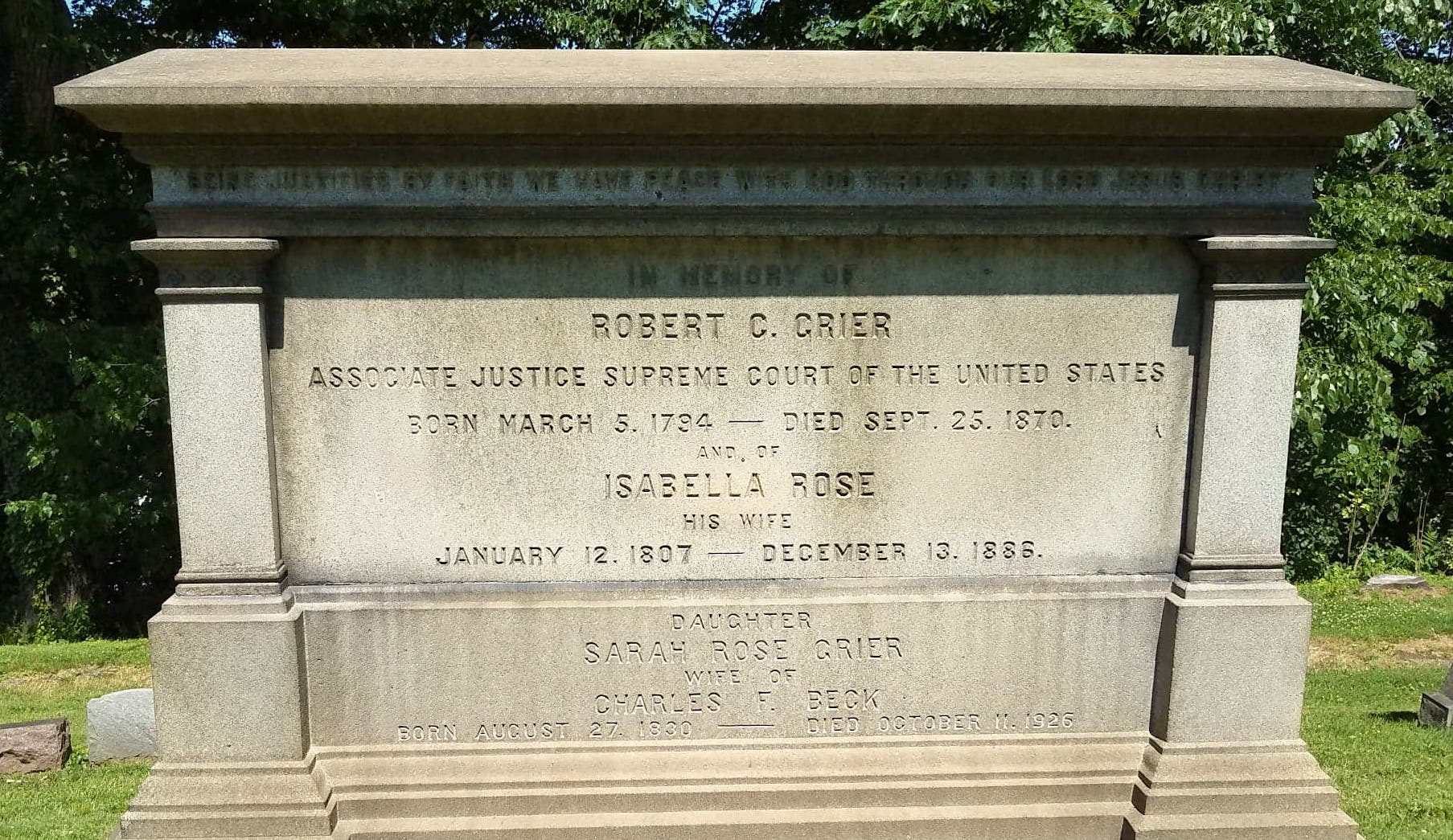
Grier's gravesite at West Laurel Hill Cemetery in Bala Cynwyd, Pennsylvania

His health declined significantly after 1867 and his votes and mind wandered during the Legal Tender Cases. Justice Stephen Johnson Field led a delegation to convince Grier to retire and he acquiesced. His judicial service ended on January 31, 1870. He died September 25, 1870 in Philadelphia, and was interred at West Laurel Hill Cemetery in Bala Cynwyd, Pennsylvania.

== Personal life ==
Grier married Isabelle Rose, the daughter of a wealthy Scottish immigrant and together they had five daughters and one son. He owned an estate in Williamsport, Pennsylvania, where he liked to entertain and fish.

== See also ==
- List of justices of the Supreme Court of the United States

Legal offices
Preceded by Henry Baldwin	Associate Justice of the Supreme Court of the United States; 1846–1870	Succeeded by William Strong
