= Brown v. Allen =

- Supreme Court of the United States

Argued April 29, 1952 Reargued October 13, 1952 Decided February 9, 1953
- Full case name: Brown v. Allen
- Citations: 344 U.S. 443 (more)

Holding
- A failure to use a state's available remedy, in the absence of some interference or incapacity, bars federal habeas corpus.

Court membership
- Chief Justice Fred M. Vinson Associate Justices Hugo Black · Stanley F. Reed; Felix Frankfurter · William O. Douglas; Robert H. Jackson · Harold H. Burton; Tom C. Clark · Sherman Minton

Brown v. Allen, 344 U.S. 443 (1953), is a landmark United States Supreme Court case about habeas corpus.

== Background ==
United States courts are authorized by statute (28 USC §2241 pursuant to §2254) to grant habeas relief to prisoners who have been convicted by a state court.

Justice Felix Frankfurter concurring in Brown notes the "uniqueness" of habeas corpus is its availability to "bring into question the legality of a person's restraint and to require justification for such detention". Justice Chase said habeas corpus has long been considered "the best and only sufficient defense of personal freedom".

== Case history ==
The named petitioner Brown was convicted of rape and sentenced to death by the state of North Carolina in 1950. He challenged the indictment alleging discrimination in the selection of grand jurors. He also challenged the admission into evidence of a confession he claimed was coerced. The state supreme court affirmed the conviction.

In two of the cases Speller v. Crawford (99 F. Supp 92) and Daniels v. Crawford (99 F. Supp. 208) the district court heard new evidence in addition to the trial and appellate records. In Brown v. Crawford (98 F. Supp. 866) the district court accepted the findings of the sentencing judge without considering new evidence.

== Supreme Court ==
Brown v. Allen held that federal courts had statutory authority under the Habeas Corpus Act of 1867 to hear collateral attacks on state convictions for constitutional error, even if the state courts had already adjudicated the federal question fully and fairly, unless there was a state ground for procedural default. There were two major opinions: the formal opinion of Justice Reed and a separate opinion by Justice Frankfurter.

=== Vote breakdown ===
Justice Frankfurter wrote two opinions. There were some differences between the Reed and Frankfurter opinions on the effect of the denial of certiorari. Justice Reed said Frankfurter's opinion concurring in the judgment represented the position of the majority about the effect of the denial of certiorari. Frankfurter also noted the interest in uniformity of "enforcement of the Constitution" in all states and outlined some guidelines or standards for limiting federal habeas review.

Justice Jackson concurred in the judgment only.

Justice Frankfurter, joined by Justice Black and Justice Douglas, wrote separately dissenting from the judgment. Justice Black also wrote separately dissenting from the judgment.

=== Opinion of the Court ===
While state adjudication is not res judicata for so-called "mixed questions of law", federal courts may dismiss petitions if they are "satisfied, by the record, that the state process has given fair consideration...and has resulted in a satisfactory conclusion." Writing separately Justice Felix Frankfurter said that "state adjudication of questions of law cannot, under the habeas corpus statute, be accepted as binding." He said the enforcement of federal constitutional rights was determined by the Habeas Corpus Act of 1867: "It is for this Court to give fair effect to the habeas corpus jurisdiction as enacted by Congress". The decision of a state court about the legality of a prisoner's detention made "on the facts presented" does not require a new hearing "on the merits, facts or law" if the reviewing federal court is "satisfied that federal constitutional rights have been protected".

Under a state's procedural rules there may exist requirements for some types of errors to be raised on appeal. Failing to exhaust these state remedies when are available was a clear ground to deny habeas applications. Therefore, in the consolidated case Daniels v. Allen habeas was denied because the defendant was one day late filing paperwork. The Court ruled that the procedural default "bars subsequent objection to conviction" unless the default occurs because of "because of lack of counsel, incapacity, or some interference by officials". The Court said the petitioners had counsel and were not obstructed by the state. This was relaxed when Fay v. Noia ruled that claims could only be forfeited by "deliberate bypass".

Justice Jackson concurring in the judgment said the "vague and unsettled" requirements of substantive due process allowed "floods of stale, frivolous and repetitious petitions". He says habeas relief should be limited to jurisdictional questions where a state denied a prisoner in custody access to state courts or improperly obstructed him from making a record.

== Reaction ==
The Wall Street Journal called the decision a "woe for the lawyers". Justice Douglas later said the opinions in Brown "were so long, and so discursive that one could find in them what he was looking for".

Paul Bator wrote an influential article Finality in Criminal Law and Federal Habeas Corpus for State Prisoners (1963) arguing that Brown represented a "radical" departure from established precedents. There has been significant disagreement about Bator's assertion that Moore v. Dempsey only allowed federal habeas review of state convictions when state procedures were inadequate to provide a "full and fair" hearing for federal questions. This view was rejected by the Court in Fay v. Noia but became more influential as new conservative justices were appointed.

Justice Sandra Day O'Connor, concurring in the judgment in Wright v. West (1992), wrote separately because she disagreed with the majority's legal analysis which closely followed Bator's explanation pre-1953 habeas law.

Stephen A. Saltzburg said Brown was not a "departure from prior holdings". Saltzburg emphasized that the scope of federal habeas jurisdiction was determined by statute and said the Brown decision "appears to be a sound reading of the intent of Congress in enacting the 1867 habeas corpus statute". Gary Peller said "Brown v. Allen simply did not break any new ground" by allowing federal district courts to review state court adjudication of federal questions.

== Subsequent developments ==
Aside from instructing district courts to grant hearings if they found a "vital flaw" or "unusual circumstances" in the state proceedings, the standard after Brown was vague and left wide discretionary power to the district courts. The circuit court decisions that followed were "confused."

The majority in Brown held that Daniels procedurally defaulted by not serving appeal papers on time. Later, Fay v. Noia held that federal courts could consider claims that were procedurally defaulted in state courts unless the habeas applicant "deliberately by-passed the orderly procedure of the state courts".
