= Habeas Corpus Act of 1867 =

Act of Congress

The Habeas Corpus Act of 1867 (sess. ii, chap. 28, 14 Stat. 385) is an act of Congress that significantly expanded the jurisdiction of federal courts to issue writs of habeas corpus. Passed February 5, 1867, the Act amended the Judiciary Act of 1789 to grant the courts the power to issue writs of habeas corpus "in all cases where any person may be restrained of their liberty in violation of the constitution, or any treaty or law of the United States." Prior to the Act's passage, prisoners in the custody of one of the states who wished to challenge the legality of their detention could petition for a writ of habeas corpus only in state courts; the federal court system was barred from issuing writs of habeas corpus in their cases. The Act also permitted the court "to go beyond the return" and question the truth of the jailer's stated justification for detaining the petitioning prisoner, whereas prior to the Act courts were technically bound to accept the jailer's word that the prisoner was actually being held for the reason stated. The Act largely restored habeas corpus following its 1863 suspension by Congress, ensuring that anyone arrested after its passage could challenge their detention in the federal courts, but denied habeas relief to anyone who was already in military custody for any military offense or for having aided the Confederacy.

Another feature of the 1867 Act is that it extended the reach of habeas to include interpersonal detention as well as official detainment:

in addition to the authority already conferred, [US Courts, and judges and justices therein] shall have power to grant writs of habeas corpus in all cases where any person may be restrained of their liberty in violation of the constitution, or of any treaty or law of the United States; and it shall be lawful for such person so restrained of their liberty to apply to either of said justices or judges for a writ of habeas corpus...and shall set forth the facts concerning the detention of the party applying, in whose custody they are detained, and by virtue of what claim or authority, if known...

Although some states already had statutes applying habeas to interpersonal as well as official confinement, such as in the case of Missouri's freedom suit provision, this federal expansion of habeas allowed petitioners in states that had not already done so to use habeas to challenge confinement contrary to the constitution, particularly in the case of coercive labor contracts that closely resembled enslavement.

When the Habeas Corpus Act of 1867 is spoken of, it is usually this act that is meant. Another act dealing with habeas corpus was passed the same day and appears on the same page of the United States Statutes at Large, being the twenty-seventh rather than the twenty-eighth chapter. It amended the Habeas Corpus Suspension Act of 1863, which permitted (among other things) government officials charged with abusing their powers under the suspension of habeas corpus to have their cases heard at the federal rather than state level. The 1867 Act ensured that the federal courts could effectively hear the cases transferred to them by issuing a writ for habeas corpus cum causa.
