= 2009 term United States Supreme Court opinions of John Paul Stevens =

The 2009 term of the Supreme Court of the United States began October 5, 2009, and concluded October 3, 2010. This was the thirty-fifth and final term of Associate Justice John Paul Stevens's tenure on the Court; Stevens retired on June 29, 2010.
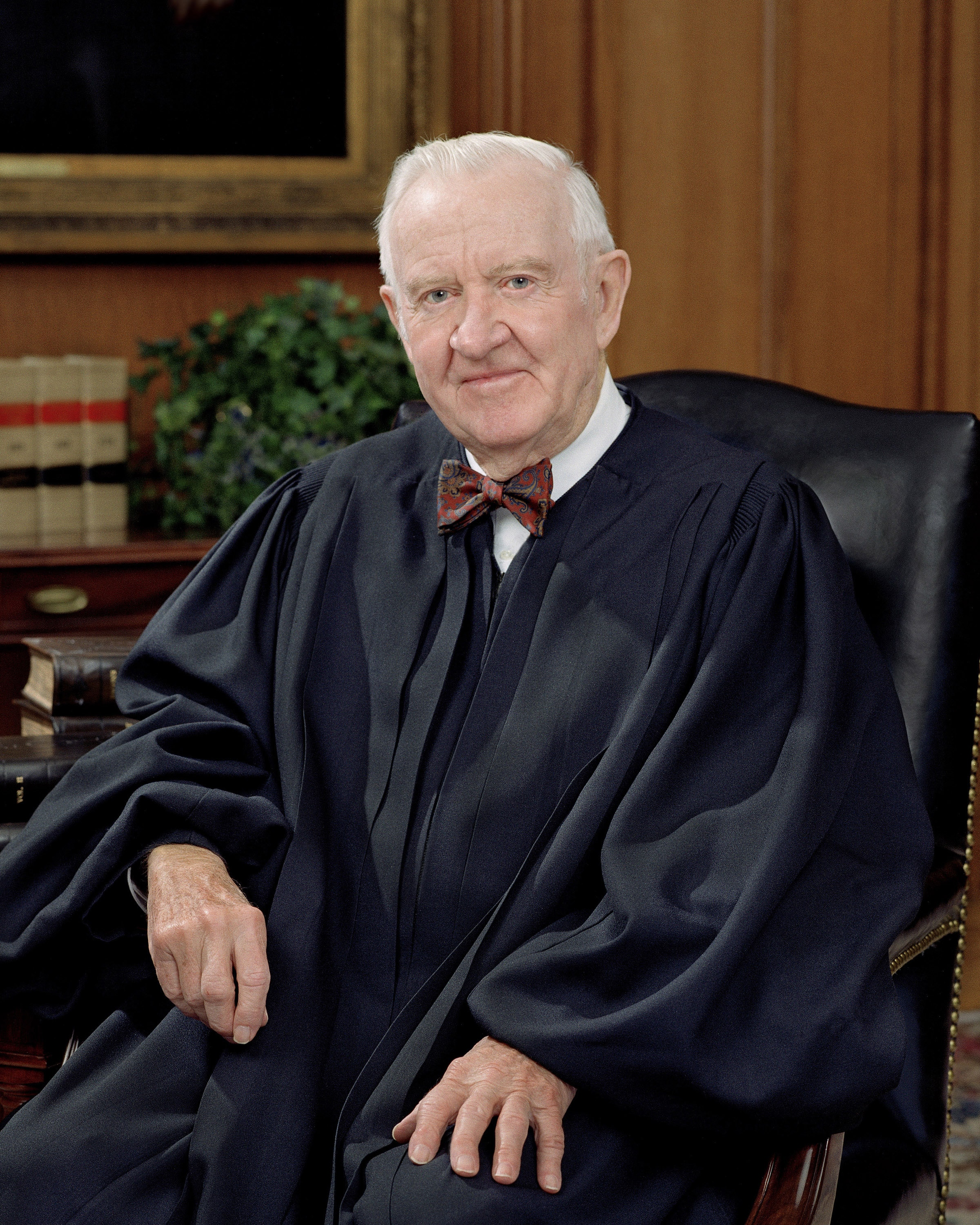

John Paul Stevens 2009 term statistics

6	Majority or plurality	13	Concurrence	3	Other
13	Dissent	2	Concurrence/dissent	Total =	37
Bench opinions = 33		Opinions relating to orders = 4		In-chambers opinions = 0
Unanimous opinions: 1		Most joined by: Ginsburg, Sotomayor (8)		Least joined by: Scalia, Thomas (4)

Type	Case	Citation	Issues	Joined by	Other opinions
	Wong v. Belmontes	558 U.S. 15 (2009)	Sixth Amendment • ineffective assistance of counsel • death penalty • jury instructions		per curiam
Stevens filed an opinion concurring in the Supreme Court's judgment that a convicted murderer on death row had failed to show that his attorney's failure to present more mitigating evidence affected the outcome of his sentencing. Stevens, however, criticized the Supreme Court's prior decision in the same case, from which he had dissented, and stated that he strongly disagreed with the decision to review the case again. The jury had been erroneously instructed that they could not give mitigating weight to any factors that did not reduce his culpability for the crime, which lead it to disregard evidence of the defendant's religious conversion and contributions to a youth rehabilitation program that could have "afford[ed] the jury a principled basis for imposing a sentence other than death." Stevens noted that "the conscientious jurors' mistaken understanding of the law would have prevented them from giving that additional evidence 'any weight at all,' let alone controlling weight."
	Michigan v. Fisher	558 U.S. 45 (2009)	Fourth Amendment • emergency aid exception	Sotomayor	per curiam
	Alvarez v. Smith	558 U.S. 87 (2009)	Case or Controversy Clause • mootness		Breyer
	Smith v. Spisak	558 U.S. 139 (2010)	Eighth Amendment • death penalty • jury instructions on mitigation • Sixth Amendment • ineffective assistance of counsel		Breyer
	NRG Power Marketing, LLC v. Maine Pub. Util. Comm'n	558 U.S. 165 (2010)	Federal Power Act • presumption of reasonable electricity rates under wholesale energy contracts		Ginsburg
	Wood v. Allen	558 U.S. 290 (2010)	habeas corpus • Sixth Amendment • ineffective assistance of counsel	Kennedy	Sotomayor
	Citizens United v. Federal Election Comm'n	558 U.S. 310 (2010)	campaign finance reform • Bipartisan Campaign Reform Act of 2002 • First Amendment • free speech • corporate speech	Ginsburg, Breyer, Sotomayor	Kennedy; Roberts; Scalia; Thomas
	United States v. Seale	558 U.S. 985 (2009)	federal kidnapping offense • statute of limitations	Scalia	
Stevens filed a statement respecting the Court's dismissal of a certified question, regarding which statute of limitations applied to the federal crime of kidnapping, 18 U.S.C. § 1201. The question arose in the federal prosecution, begun in 2007, of KKK member James Ford Seale for his role in the 1964 murders of two black teens. There was no statute of limitations for capital crimes, but if the crime was not capital in nature the limitations period would be five years and have since expired. Section 1201 was punishable by death at the time of the crime and at the time of the prosecution, but not for more than two decades in between due to a repeal of the relevant death penalty provision in 1972. The District Court in Seale's prosecution ruled that the repeal did not retroactively change the character of the crime, which a panel of the Fifth Circuit then reversed. The Fifth Circuit vacated that decision for an en banc review, but then evenly divided and so the District Court's ruling was reinstated. A majority of the Fifth Circuit then voted to certify the question to the Supreme Court. Stevens believed the certified issue was "a pure question of law that may well determine the outcome of a number of cases of ugly racial violence remaining from the 1960s." Though the question was interlocutory, due to Seale's appeal on other grounds, Stevens saw no reason to delay the resolution of that question, which Stevens viewed as "narrow, debatable, and important." Stevens further noted that the Court had not accepted a certified question since 1981, but that the certification process remains law because it "serves a valuable, if limited, function."
	Muhammad v. Kelly	558 U.S. 1019 (2009)	death penalty • staying executions	Ginsburg, Sotomayor	
Stevens filed a statement respecting the Court's denial of a stay of execution, and denial of the petition for certiorari.
	Johnson v. Bredesen	558 U.S. 1067 (2009)	Eighth Amendment • death penalty	Breyer	Thomas
Stevens filed a statement respecting the Court's denial of certiorari and a stay of execution.
	Florida v. Powell	559 U.S. 50 (2010)	Fifth Amendment • Miranda warning • adequate and independent state ground doctrine	Breyer (in part)	Ginsburg
	Maryland v. Shatzer	559 U.S. 98 (2010)	Fifth Amendment • Miranda rights • release to general prison population as break in custody		Scalia; Thomas
	Graham County Soil and Water Conservation Dist. v. United States ex rel. Wilson	559 U.S. 280 (2010)	False Claims Act • bar on qui tam suits based on publicly disclosed allegations	Roberts, Kennedy, Thomas, Ginsburg, Alito; Scalia (in part)	Scalia; Sotomayor
	Padilla v. Kentucky	559 U.S. 356 (2010)	Sixth Amendment • ineffective assistance of counsel • legal advice on deportation as consequence of conviction	Kennedy, Breyer, Ginsburg, Sotomayor	Alito; Scalia
	Shady Grove Orthopedic Associates, P. A. v. Allstate Ins. Co.	559 U.S. 393 (2010)	class actions • state rule conflict with Federal Rules of Civil Procedure • Rules Enabling Act		Scalia; Ginsburg
	Merck & Co. v. Reynolds	559 U.S. 633 (2010)	Securities Exchange Act of 1934 • securities fraud • statute of limitations • discovery rule and scienter		Breyer; Scalia
	Salazar v. Buono	559 U.S. 700 (2010)	Article III • standing • First Amendment • Establishment Clause • display of religious symbol on government land • land transfer from government to private owner	Ginsburg, Sotomayor	Kennedy; Roberts; Scalia; Alito; Breyer
	Renico v. Lett	559 U.S. 766 (2010)	Fifth Amendment • Double Jeopardy Clause • retrial after mistrial	Sotomayor; Breyer (in part)	Roberts
	Florida v. Rigterink	559 U.S. 965 (2010)	adequate and independent state ground doctrine		
Stevens dissented from the Court's summary granting of certiorari, vacatur of decision by the Florida Supreme Court, and remand. Stevens believed the lower court's decision rested upon an adequate and independent state ground, leaving the Court without jurisdiction to vacate the judgment.
	Abbott v. Abbott	560 U.S. 1 (2010)	Hague Convention on the Civil Aspects of International Child Abduction • International Child Abduction Remedies Act • ne exeat right as right of custody	Thomas, Breyer	Kennedy
	Graham v. Florida	560 U.S. 48 (2010)	Eighth Amendment • cruel and unusual punishment • sentencing of juveniles to life imprisonment for nonhomicide crimes	Ginsburg, Sotomayor	Kennedy; Roberts; Thomas; Alito
	American Needle, Inc. v. National Football League	560 U.S. 183 (2010)	antitrust law • National Football League team intellectual property licensing • concerted action • Rule of Reason	Unanimous	
	United States v. O'Brien	560 U.S. 218 (2010)	use of machine gun in federal crime as element or sentencing factor		Kennedy; Thomas
	Hardt v. Reliance Standard Life Ins. Co.	560 U.S. 242 (2010)	Employee Retirement Income Security Act of 1974 • award of attorney's fees		Thomas
	United States v. Marcus	560 U.S. 258 (2010)	plain error standard of review • Ex Post Facto Clause • Trafficking Victims Protection Act of 2000		Breyer
	Samantar v. Yousuf	560 U.S. 305 (2010)	Foreign Sovereign Immunities Act • immunity for officials of foreign states	Roberts, Kennedy, Ginsburg, Breyer, Alito, Sotomayor	Scalia; Thomas; Alito
	Carachuri-Rosendo v. Holder	560 U.S. 563 (2010)	Immigration and Nationality Act • discretionary cancellation of removal proceedings • drug possession as aggravated felony	Roberts, Kennedy, Ginsburg, Breyer, Alito, Sotomayor	Scalia; Thomas
	New Process Steel, L. P. v. NLRB	560 U.S. 674 (2010)	Taft-Hartley Act • National Labor Relations Board • delegation of powers to groups of members	Roberts, Scalia, Thomas, Alito	Kennedy
	Ontario v. Quon	560 U.S. 746 (2010)	Fourth Amendment • government review of employee text messages		Kennedy; Scalia
	Dillon v. United States	560 U.S. 817 (2010)	United States Federal Sentencing Guidelines • sentence reduction • possession of crack cocaine		Sotomayor
	Rent-A-Center, West, Inc. v. Jackson	561 U.S. 63 (2010)	Federal Arbitration Act • challenge to enforceability of arbitration agreement	Ginsburg, Breyer, Sotomayor	Scalia
	Monsanto Co. v. Geertson Seed Farms	561 U.S. 139 (2010)	Plant Protection Act • deregulation of genetically modified plants • Article III • standing		Alito
	Doe v. Reed	561 U.S. 186 (2010)	public disclosure of referendum petitions • First Amendment • free speech	Breyer	Roberts; Scalia; Breyer; Alito; Sotomayor; Thomas
	Morrison v. National Australia Bank Ltd.	561 U.S. 247 (2010)	Securities and Exchange Act of 1934 • SEC Rule 10b-5 • extraterritorial application	Ginsburg	Scalia; Breyer
	Bilski v. Kappos	561 U.S. 593 (2010)	patent law • patentability of business method	Ginsburg, Breyer, Sotomayor	Kennedy; Breyer
	Christian Legal Soc. Chapter of Univ. of Cal., Hastings College of Law v. Martinez	561 U.S. 661 (2010)	nondiscrimination policy for university student organizations • First Amendment • free speech • public forum doctrine		Ginsburg; Kennedy; Alito
	McDonald v. Chicago	561 U.S. 742 (2010)	Second Amendment • Fourteenth Amendment • Incorporation Doctrine • gun control		Alito; Scalia; Thomas; Breyer
