= 2009 term United States Supreme Court opinions of Sonia Sotomayor =

The 2009 term of the Supreme Court of the United States began October 5, 2009, and concluded October 3, 2010. This was the first term of Associate Justice Sonia Sotomayor's tenure on the Court.
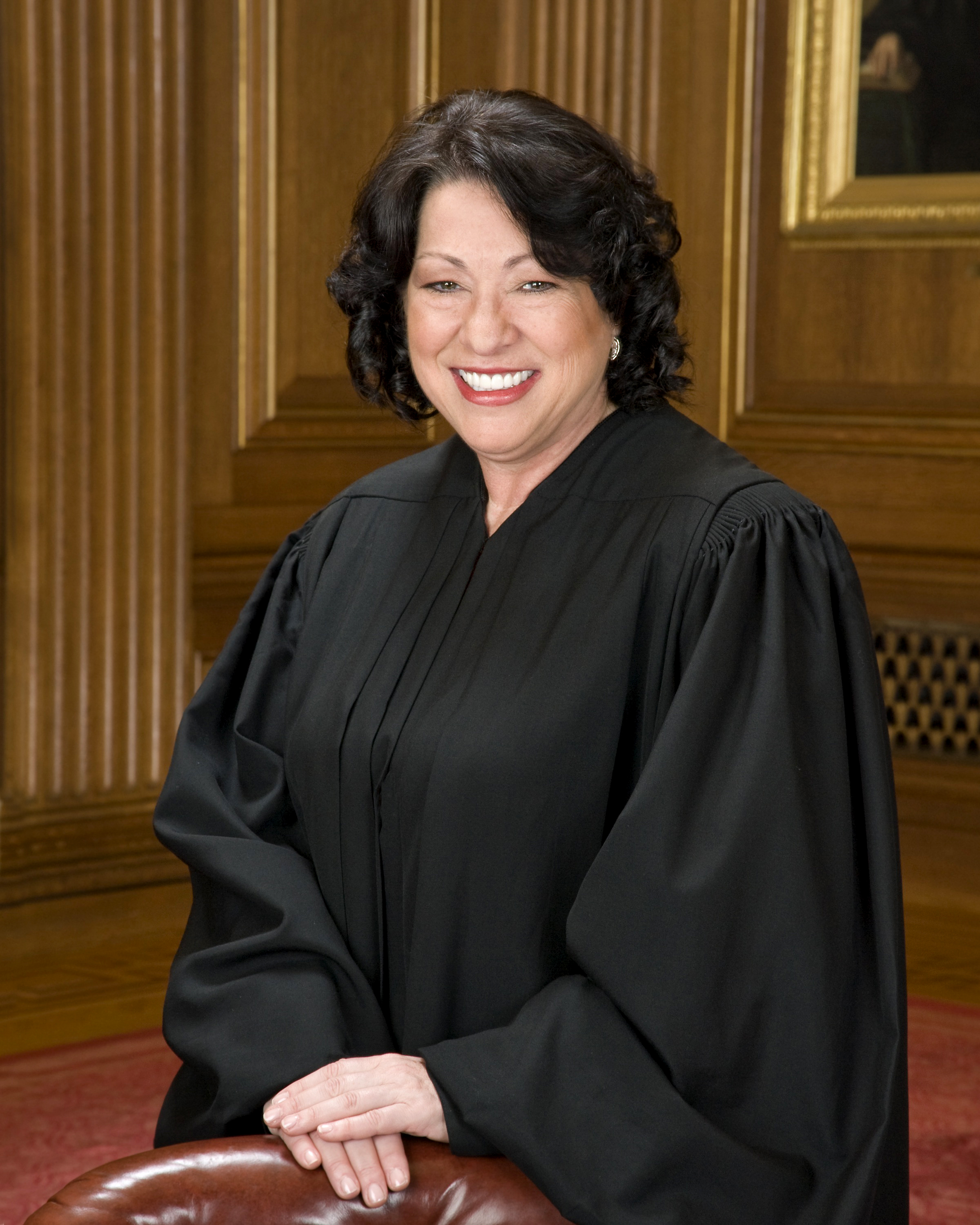

Sonia Sotomayor 2009 term statistics

8	Majority or plurality	2	Concurrence	1	Other
4	Dissent	2	Concurrence/dissent	Total =	17
Bench opinions = 16		Opinions relating to orders = 1		In-chambers opinions = 0
Unanimous opinions: 1		Most joined by: Stevens (12)		Least joined by: Alito (5)

Type	Case	Citation	Issues	Joined by	Other opinions
	Mohawk Industries, Inc. v. Carpenter	558 U.S. 100 (2009)	appealability of disclosure orders adverse to attorney–client privilege • collateral order doctrine	Roberts, Stevens, Scalia, Kennedy, Ginsburg, Breyer, Alito; Thomas (in part)	Thomas
	Wood v. Allen	558 U.S. 290 (2010)	habeas corpus • Sixth Amendment • ineffective assistance of counsel	Roberts, Scalia, Thomas, Ginsburg, Breyer, Alito	Stevens
	Milavetz, Gallop & Milavetz, P. A. v. United States	559 U.S. 229 (2010)	Bankruptcy Abuse Prevention and Consumer Protection Act of 2005 • bankruptcy attorneys as debt relief agencies	Roberts, Stevens, Kennedy, Ginsburg, Breyer, Alito; Scalia, Thomas (in part)	Scalia; Thomas
	Graham County Soil and Water Conservation Dist. v. United States ex rel. Wilson	559 U.S. 280 (2010)	False Claims Act • bar on qui tam suits based on publicly disclosed allegations	Breyer	Stevens; Scalia
	Jerman v. Carlisle, McNellie, Rini, Kramer & Ulrich LPA	559 U.S. 573 (2010)	Fair Debt Collection Practices Act • exclusion of legal errors from bona fide error defense	Roberts, Stevens, Thomas, Ginsburg, Breyer	Scalia; Breyer; Kennedy
	Hui v. Castaneda	559 U.S. 799 (2010)	Federal Tort Claims Act • Public Health Service employee immunity from liability	Unanimous	
	Robertson v. United States ex rel. Watson	560 U.S. 272 (2010)	criminal contempt proceedings initiated by private action	Kennedy	per curiam; Roberts
	Berghuis v. Thompkins	560 U.S. 370 (2010)	Fifth Amendment • waiver of right to remain silent • Sixth Amendment • ineffective assistance of counsel	Stevens, Ginsburg, Breyer	Kennedy
	Carr v. United States	560 U.S. 438 (2010)	Sex Offender Registration and Notification Act • registration requirements for interstate travel • ex post facto application	Roberts, Stevens, Kennedy, Breyer; Scalia (in part)	Scalia; Alito
	Krupski v. Costa Crociere S. p. A.	560 U.S. 538 (2010)	Federal Rules of Civil Procedure • relation back doctrine	Roberts, Stevens, Kennedy, Thomas, Ginsburg, Breyer, Alito	Scalia
	Astrue v. Ratliff	560 U.S. 586 (2010)	Equal Access to Justice Act • award of attorney's fees • administrative offset to satisfy debt to government	Stevens, Ginsburg	Thomas
	Dillon v. United States	560 U.S. 817 (2010)	Federal Sentencing Guidelines • sentence reduction • possession of crack cocaine	Roberts, Scalia, Kennedy, Thomas, Ginsburg, Breyer	Stevens
	Wrotten v. New York	560 U.S. 959 (2010)	Sixth Amendment • Confrontation Clause • testimony by two-way video		
Sotomayor filed a statement respecting the Court's denial of certiorari.
	Kawasaki Kisen Kaisha Ltd. v. Regal-Beloit Corp.	561 U.S. 89 (2010)	Carriage of Goods by Sea Act • forum selection clause	Stevens, Ginsburg	Kennedy
	Doe v. Reed	561 U.S. 186 (2010)	public disclosure of referendum petitions • First Amendment • free speech	Stevens, Ginsburg	Roberts; Stevens; Scalia; Breyer; Alito; Thomas
	Granite Rock Co. v. Teamsters	561 U.S. 287 (2010)	Labor Management Relations Act • arbitration of collective bargaining agreement ratification date	Stevens	Thomas
	Skilling v. United States	561 U.S. 358 (2010)	Enron scandal • Sixth Amendment • Article III • change of venue • juror prejudice from pretrial publicity • honest services fraud	Stevens, Breyer	Ginsburg; Scalia; Alito
