= 2009 term United States Supreme Court opinions of Stephen Breyer =

The 2009 term of the Supreme Court of the United States began October 5, 2009, and concluded October 3, 2010. This was the sixteenth term of Associate Justice Stephen Breyer's tenure on the Court.
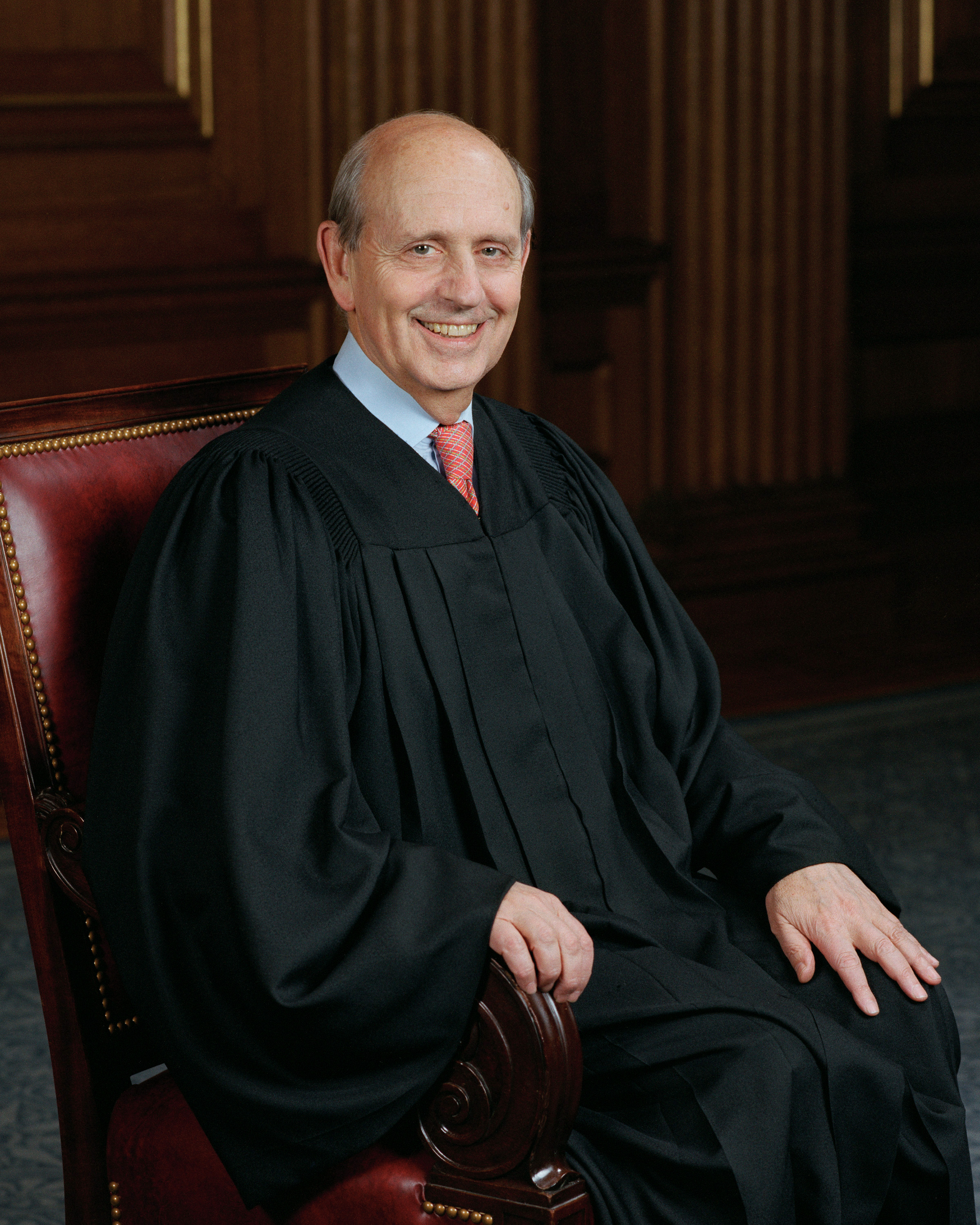

Stephen Breyer 2009 term statistics

9	Majority or plurality	6	Concurrence	0	Other
7	Dissent	2	Concurrence/dissent	Total =	24
Bench opinions = 24		Opinions relating to orders = 0		In-chambers opinions = 0
Unanimous opinions: 1		Most joined by: Ginsburg (16)		Least joined by: Scalia, Thomas (6)

Type	Case	Citation	Issues	Joined by	Other opinions
	Alvarez v. Smith	558 U.S. 87 (2009)	Case or Controversy Clause • mootness	Roberts, Scalia, Kennedy, Thomas, Ginsburg, Alito, Sotomayor; Stevens (in part)	Stevens
	Smith v. Spisak	558 U.S. 139 (2010)	Eighth Amendment • death penalty • jury instructions on mitigation • Sixth Amendment • ineffective assistance of counsel	Roberts, Scalia, Kennedy, Thomas, Ginsburg, Alito, Sotomayor; Stevens (in part)	Stevens
	Hollingsworth v. Perry	558 U.S. 183 (2010)	Proposition 8 • broadcast of federal trial • district court local rule revision	Stevens, Ginsburg, Sotomayor	per curiam
	Hemi Group, LLC v. City of New York	559 U.S. 1 (2010)	Racketeer Influenced and Corrupt Organizations Act • Jenkins Act • taxation of online cigarette sales • lost tax revenue as injury to municipality	Stevens, Kennedy	Roberts; Ginsburg
	Hertz Corp. v. Friend	559 U.S. 77 (2010)	removal jurisdiction • diversity jurisdiction • principal place of business test	Unanimous	
	Conkright v. Frommert	559 U.S. 506 (2010)	Employee Retirement Income Security Act of 1974 • standard of review of plan administrator interpretration	Stevens, Ginsburg	Roberts
	Perdue v. Kenny A.	559 U.S. 542 (2010)	Civil Rights Attorney's Fees Award Act of 1976 • calculation of attorney's fees	Stevens, Ginsburg, Sotomayor	Alito; Kennedy; Thomas
	Jerman v. Carlisle, McNellie, Rini, Kramer & Ulrich LPA	559 U.S. 573 (2010)	Fair Debt Collection Practices Act • exclusion of legal errors from bona fide error defense		Sotomayor; Scalia; Kennedy
	Merck & Co. v. Reynolds	559 U.S. 633 (2010)	Securities Exchange Act of 1934 • securities fraud • statute of limitations • discovery rule and scienter	Roberts, Kennedy, Ginsburg, Alito, Sotomayor	Stevens; Scalia
	Salazar v. Buono	559 U.S. 700 (2010)	Article III • standing • First Amendment • Establishment Clause • display of religious symbol on government land • land transfer from government to private owner		Kennedy; Roberts; Scalia; Alito; Stevens
	United States v. Comstock	560 U.S. 126 (2010)	Necessary and Proper Clause • civil commitment of mentally ill, sexually dangerous prisoners	Roberts, Stevens, Ginsburg, Sotomayor	Kennedy; Alito; Thomas
	United States v. Marcus	560 U.S. 258 (2010)	plain error standard of review • Ex Post Facto Clause • Trafficking Victims Protection Act of 2000	Roberts, Scalia, Kennedy, Thomas, Ginsburg, Alito	Stevens
	Alabama v. North Carolina	560 U.S. 330 (2010)	Southeast Interstate Low-Level Radioactive Waste Compact	Roberts	Scalia; Kennedy; Roberts
	Barber v. Thomas	560 U.S. 474 (2010)	Federal Bureau of Prisons calculation of good time credit	Roberts, Scalia, Thomas, Alito, Sotomayor	Kennedy
	Dolan v. United States	560 U.S. 605 (2010)	Mandatory Victims Restitution Act • deadline for restitution order	Thomas, Ginsburg, Alito, Sotomayor	Roberts
	Holland v. Florida	560 U.S. 631 (2010)	Antiterrorism and Effective Death Penalty Act of 1996 • statute of limitations • equitable tolling	Roberts, Stevens, Kennedy, Ginsburg, Sotomayor	Alito; Scalia
	Stop the Beach Renourishment, Inc. v. Florida Dept. of Environmental Protection	560 U.S. 702 (2010)	Fifth Amendment • Takings Clause • littoral rights	Ginsburg	Scalia; Kennedy
	Holder v. Humanitarian Law Project	561 U.S. 1 (2010)	USA Patriot Act • nonviolent training and expert advice as material support to terrorism • standing • Fifth Amendment • Due Process Clause • First Amendment • free speech • freedom of association	Ginsburg, Sotomayor	Roberts
	Doe v. Reed	561 U.S. 186 (2010)	public disclosure of referendum petitions • First Amendment • free speech		Roberts; Stevens; Scalia; Alito; Sotomayor; Thomas
	Morrison v. National Australia Bank Ltd.	561 U.S. 247 (2010)	Securities and Exchange Act of 1934 • SEC Rule 10b-5 • extraterritorial application		Scalia; Stevens
	Magwood v. Patterson	561 U.S. 320 (2010)	habeas corpus • Antiterrorism and Effective Death Penalty Act of 1996 • claims in second or successive applications	Stevens	Thomas; Kennedy
	Free Enterprise Fund v. Public Company Accounting Oversight Bd.	561 U.S. 477 (2010)	Sarbanes-Oxley Act of 2002 • Public Company Accounting Oversight Board • separation of powers • Appointments Clause	Stevens, Ginsburg, Sotomayor	Roberts
	Bilski v. Kappos	561 U.S. 593 (2010)	patent law • patentability of business method	Scalia (in part)	Kennedy; Stevens
	McDonald v. Chicago	561 U.S. 742 (2010)	Second Amendment • Fourteenth Amendment • Incorporation Doctrine • gun control	Ginsburg, Sotomayor	Alito; Scalia; Thomas; Stevens
