= 2009 term United States Supreme Court opinions of Antonin Scalia =

The 2009 term of the Supreme Court of the United States began October 5, 2009, and concluded October 3, 2010. This was the twenty-fourth term of Associate Justice Antonin Scalia's tenure on the Court.
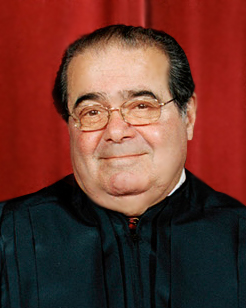

Antonin Scalia 2009 term statistics

8	Majority or plurality	16	Concurrence	1	Other
6	Dissent	0	Concurrence/dissent	Total =	31
Bench opinions = 28		Opinions relating to orders = 2		In-chambers opinions = 1
Unanimous opinions: 1		Most joined by: Thomas (16)		Least joined by: Stevens (3)

Type	Case	Citation	Issues	Joined by	Other opinions
	Wellons v. Hall	558 U.S. 220 (2010)	habeas corpus • procedural default • GVR orders	Thomas	per curiam; Alito
	Citizens United v. Federal Election Comm'n	558 U.S. 310 (2010)	campaign finance reform • Bipartisan Campaign Reform Act of 2002 • First Amendment • free speech • corporate speech	Alito; Thomas (in part)	Kennedy; Roberts; Stevens; Thomas
	Webster v. Cooper	558 U.S. 1039 (2009)	habeas corpus • statute of limitations • GVR orders		
Scalia dissented from the Court's decision to vacate a lower court's decision and remand for further consideration in light of the Court's decision in Jimenez v. Quarterman. Scalia objected that, as Jimenez was decided more than two months prior to the lower court's decision under review, there was no basis for treating Jimenez as an "intervening factor" that the lower court could not have considered.
	Maryland v. Shatzer	559 U.S. 98 (2010)	Fifth Amendment • Miranda rights • release to general prison population as break in custody	Roberts, Kennedy, Ginsburg, Breyer, Alito, Sotomayor; Thomas (in part)	Stevens; Thomas
	Johnson v. United States	559 U.S. 133 (2010)	Armed Career Criminal Act • state battery conviction as predicate violent felony	Roberts, Stevens, Kennedy, Ginsburg, Breyer, Sotomayor	Alito
	Milavetz, Gallop & Milavetz, P. A. v. United States	559 U.S. 229 (2010)	Bankruptcy Abuse Prevention and Consumer Protection Act of 2005 • bankruptcy attorneys as debt relief agencies		Sotomayor; Thomas
	Graham County Soil and Water Conservation Dist. v. United States ex rel. Wilson	559 U.S. 280 (2010)	False Claims Act • bar on qui tam suits based on publicly disclosed allegations		Stevens; Sotomayor
	Padilla v. Kentucky	559 U.S. 356 (2010)	Sixth Amendment • ineffective assistance of counsel • legal advice on deportation as consequence of conviction	Thomas	Stevens; Alito
	Shady Grove Orthopedic Associates, P. A. v. Allstate Ins. Co.	559 U.S. 393 (2010)	class actions • state rule conflict with Federal Rules of Civil Procedure • Rules Enabling Act	Roberts, Thomas; Stevens, Sotomayor (in part)	Stevens; Ginsburg
	Jerman v. Carlisle, McNellie, Rini, Kramer & Ulrich LPA	559 U.S. 573 (2010)	Fair Debt Collection Practices Act • exclusion of legal errors from bona fide error defense		Sotomayor; Breyer; Kennedy
	Merck & Co. v. Reynolds	559 U.S. 633 (2010)	Securities Exchange Act of 1934 • securities fraud • statute of limitations • discovery rule and scienter	Thomas	Breyer; Stevens
	Salazar v. Buono	559 U.S. 700 (2010)	Article III • standing • First Amendment • Establishment Clause • display of religious symbol on government land • land transfer from government to private owner	Thomas	Kennedy; Roberts; Alito; Stevens; Breyer
	Holster v. Gatco, Inc.	559 U.S. 1060 (2010)	Telephone Consumer Protection Act of 1991 • class actions • state rule conflict with Federal Rules of Civil Procedure		Ginsburg
Scalia concurred in the Court's decision to grant certiorari, vacate, and remand the lower court's judgment.
	Lewis v. Chicago	560 U.S. 205 (2010)	Title VII • disparate impact claim • statute of limitations	Unanimous	
	Jefferson v. Upton	560 U.S. 284 (2010)	habeas corpus • presumption of correctness for state court factual determinations • Sixth Amendment • ineffective assistance of counsel	Thomas	per curiam
	Samantar v. Yousuf	560 U.S. 305 (2010)	Foreign Sovereign Immunities Act • immunity for officials of foreign states		Stevens; Thomas; Alito
	Alabama v. North Carolina	560 U.S. 330 (2010)	Southeast Interstate Low-Level Radioactive Waste Compact	Stevens, Ginsburg, Alito; Roberts, Kennedy, Thomas, Breyer, Sotomayor (in part)	Kennedy; Roberts; Breyer
	Carr v. United States	560 U.S. 438 (2010)	Sex Offender Registration and Notification Act • registration requirements for interstate travel • ex post facto application		Sotomayor; Alito
	Hamilton v. Lanning	560 U.S. 505 (2010)	bankruptcy law • Chapter 13 • Bankruptcy Abuse Prevention and Consumer Protection Act of 2005 • calculation of debtor's projected disposal income		Alito
	Krupski v. Costa Crociere S. p. A.	560 U.S. 538 (2010)	Federal Rules of Civil Procedure • relation back doctrine		Sotomayor
	Carachuri-Rosendo v. Holder	560 U.S. 563 (2010)	Immigration and Nationality Act • discretionary cancellation of removal proceedings • drug possession as aggravated felony		Stevens; Thomas
	Holland v. Florida	560 U.S. 631 (2010)	Antiterrorism and Effective Death Penalty Act of 1996 • statute of limitations • equitable tolling	Thomas (in part)	Breyer; Alito
	Stop the Beach Renourishment, Inc. v. Florida Dept. of Environmental Protection	560 U.S. 702 (2010)	Fifth Amendment • Takings Clause • littoral rights	Roberts, Thomas, Alito; Kennedy, Ginsburg, Breyer, Sotomayor (in part)	Kennedy; Breyer
	Ontario v. Quon	560 U.S. 746 (2010)	Fourth Amendment • government review of employee text messages		Kennedy; Stevens
	Rent-A-Center, West, Inc. v. Jackson	561 U.S. 63 (2010)	Federal Arbitration Act • challenge to enforceability of arbitration agreement	Roberts, Kennedy, Thomas, Alito	Stevens
	Doe v. Reed	561 U.S. 186 (2010)	public disclosure of referendum petitions • First Amendment • free speech		Roberts; Stevens; Breyer; Alito; Sotomayor; Thomas
	Morrison v. National Australia Bank Ltd.	561 U.S. 247 (2010)	Securities and Exchange Act of 1934 • SEC Rule 10b-5 • extraterritorial application	Roberts, Kennedy, Thomas, Alito	Stevens; Breyer
	Skilling v. United States	561 U.S. 358 (2010)	Enron scandal • Sixth Amendment • Article III • change of venue • juror prejudice from pretrial publicity • honest services fraud	Thomas; Kennedy (in part)	Ginsburg; Alito; Sotomayor
	Black v. United States	561 U.S. 465 (2010)	honest services fraud • Federal Rules of Criminal Procedure • preservation of objections to jury instructions	Thomas	Ginsburg; Kennedy
	McDonald v. Chicago	561 U.S. 742 (2010)	Second Amendment • Fourteenth Amendment • Incorporation Doctrine • gun control		Alito; Thomas; Stevens; Breyer
	Philip Morris USA Inc. v. Scott	561 U.S. 1301 (2010)	tobacco litigation		
Scalia granted an application for a stay.
