= 2009 term United States Supreme Court opinions of Anthony Kennedy =

The 2009 term of the Supreme Court of the United States began October 5, 2009, and concluded October 3, 2010. This was the twenty-third term of Associate Justice Anthony Kennedy's tenure on the Court.
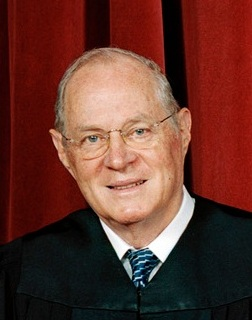

Anthony Kennedy 2009 term statistics

9	Majority or plurality	8	Concurrence	1	Other
4	Dissent	0	Concurrence/dissent	Total =	22
Bench opinions = 21		Opinions relating to orders = 1		In-chambers opinions = 0
Unanimous opinions: 0		Most joined by: Roberts, Alito (10)		Least joined by: Stevens (5)

Type	Case	Citation	Issues	Joined by	Other opinions
	Beard v. Kindler	558 U.S. 53 (2009)	habeas corpus review • adequate and independent state ground doctrine • discretionary state procedural rules	Thomas	Roberts
	Citizens United v. Federal Election Comm'n	558 U.S. 310 (2010)	campaign finance reform • Bipartisan Campaign Reform Act of 2002 • First Amendment • free speech • corporate speech	Roberts, Scalia, Alito; Stevens, Thomas, Ginsburg, Breyer, Sotomayor (in part)	Roberts; Scalia; Stevens; Thomas
	DTD Enterprises, Inc. v. Wells	558 U.S. 964 (2009)	class action • imposition of class notification cost on defendant	Roberts, Sotomayor	
Kennedy filed a statement respecting the Court's denial of certiorari, to note that, although he agreed with the denial in this instance, the petition for certiorari raised issues of constitutional importance. In a class action lawsuit, the New Jersey state trial court had imposed the costs of class notification upon the defendants apparently for no other reason than their ability to pay it. Kennedy believed that serious Due Process implications were raised if New Jersey law permitted this solely based on the relative wealth of the parties, without any consideration of the underlying merits of the case. As the petition to the Court was interlocutory, however, due to the state courts denying leave to appeal, the Court would have to interpret state law without any state court opinion on the matter. Further, the defendant had declared bankruptcy, and the applicability of the automatic stay raised an unrelated procedural obstacle to the case. Kennedy believed that under those circumstances, it was best to deny the petition notwithstanding the substantive constitutional issues.
	Perdue v. Kenny A.	559 U.S. 542 (2010)	Civil Rights Attorney's Fees Award Act of 1976 • calculation of attorney's fees		Alito; Thomas; Breyer
	Jerman v. Carlisle, McNellie, Rini, Kramer & Ulrich LPA	559 U.S. 573 (2010)	Fair Debt Collection Practices Act • exclusion of legal errors from bona fide error defense	Alito	Sotomayor; Scalia; Breyer
	Salazar v. Buono	559 U.S. 700 (2010)	Article III • standing • First Amendment • Establishment Clause • display of religious symbol on government land • land transfer from government to private owner	Roberts; Alito (in part)	Roberts; Scalia; Alito; Stevens; Breyer
	Abbott v. Abbott	560 U.S. 1 (2010)	Hague Convention on the Civil Aspects of International Child Abduction • International Child Abduction Remedies Act • ne exeat right as right of custody	Roberts, Scalia, Ginsburg, Alito, Sotomayor	Stevens
	Graham v. Florida	560 U.S. 48 (2010)	Eighth Amendment • cruel and unusual punishment • sentencing of juveniles to life imprisonment for nonhomicide crimes	Stevens, Ginsburg, Breyer, Sotomayor	Roberts; Stevens; Thomas; Alito
	United States v. Comstock	560 U.S. 126 (2010)	Necessary and Proper Clause • civil commitment of mentally ill, sexually dangerous prisoners		Breyer; Alito; Thomas
	United States v. O'Brien	560 U.S. 218 (2010)	use of machine gun in federal crime as element or sentencing factor	Roberts, Stevens, Scalia, Ginsburg, Breyer, Alito, Sotomayor	Stevens; Thomas
	Alabama v. North Carolina	560 U.S. 330 (2010)	Southeast Interstate Low-Level Radioactive Waste Compact	Sotomayor	Scalia; Roberts; Breyer
	Berghuis v. Thompkins	560 U.S. 370 (2010)	Fifth Amendment • waiver of right to remain silent • Sixth Amendment • ineffective assistance of counsel	Roberts, Scalia, Thomas, Alito	Sotomayor
	Levin v. Commerce Energy, Inc.	560 U.S. 413 (2010)	discriminatory state taxation • comity		Ginsburg; Thomas; Alito
	Barber v. Thomas	560 U.S. 474 (2010)	Federal Bureau of Prisons calculation of good time credit	Stevens, Ginsburg	Breyer
	New Process Steel, L. P. v. NLRB	560 U.S. 674 (2010)	Taft-Hartley Act • National Labor Relations Board • delegation of powers to groups of members	Ginsburg, Breyer, Sotomayor	Stevens
	Stop the Beach Renourishment, Inc. v. Florida Dept. of Environmental Protection	560 U.S. 702 (2010)	Fifth Amendment • Takings Clause • littoral rights	Sotomayor	Scalia; Breyer
	Ontario v. Quon	560 U.S. 746 (2010)	Fourth Amendment • government review of employee text messages	Roberts, Stevens, Thomas, Ginsburg, Breyer, Alito, Sotomayor; Scalia (in part)	Stevens; Scalia
	Kawasaki Kisen Kaisha Ltd. v. Regal-Beloit Corp.	561 U.S. 89 (2010)	Carriage of Goods by Sea Act • forum selection clause	Roberts, Scalia, Thomas, Breyer, Alito	Sotomayor
	Magwood v. Patterson	561 U.S. 320 (2010)	habeas corpus • Antiterrorism and Effective Death Penalty Act of 1996 • claims in second or successive applications	Roberts, Ginsburg, Alito	Thomas; Breyer
	Black v. United States	561 U.S. 465 (2010)	honest services fraud • Federal Rules of Criminal Procedure • preservation of objections to jury instructions	Thomas	Ginsburg; Scalia
	Bilski v. Kappos	561 U.S. 593 (2010)	patent law • patentability of business method	Roberts, Thomas, Alito; Scalia (in part)	Stevens; Breyer
	Christian Legal Soc. Chapter of Univ. of Cal., Hastings College of Law v. Martinez	561 U.S. 661 (2010)	nondiscrimination policy for university student organizations • First Amendment • free speech • public forum doctrine		Ginsburg; Stevens; Alito
