= 2009 term United States Supreme Court opinions of Clarence Thomas =

The 2009 term of the Supreme Court of the United States began October 5, 2009, and concluded October 3, 2010. This was the nineteenth term of Associate Justice Clarence Thomas's tenure on the Court.
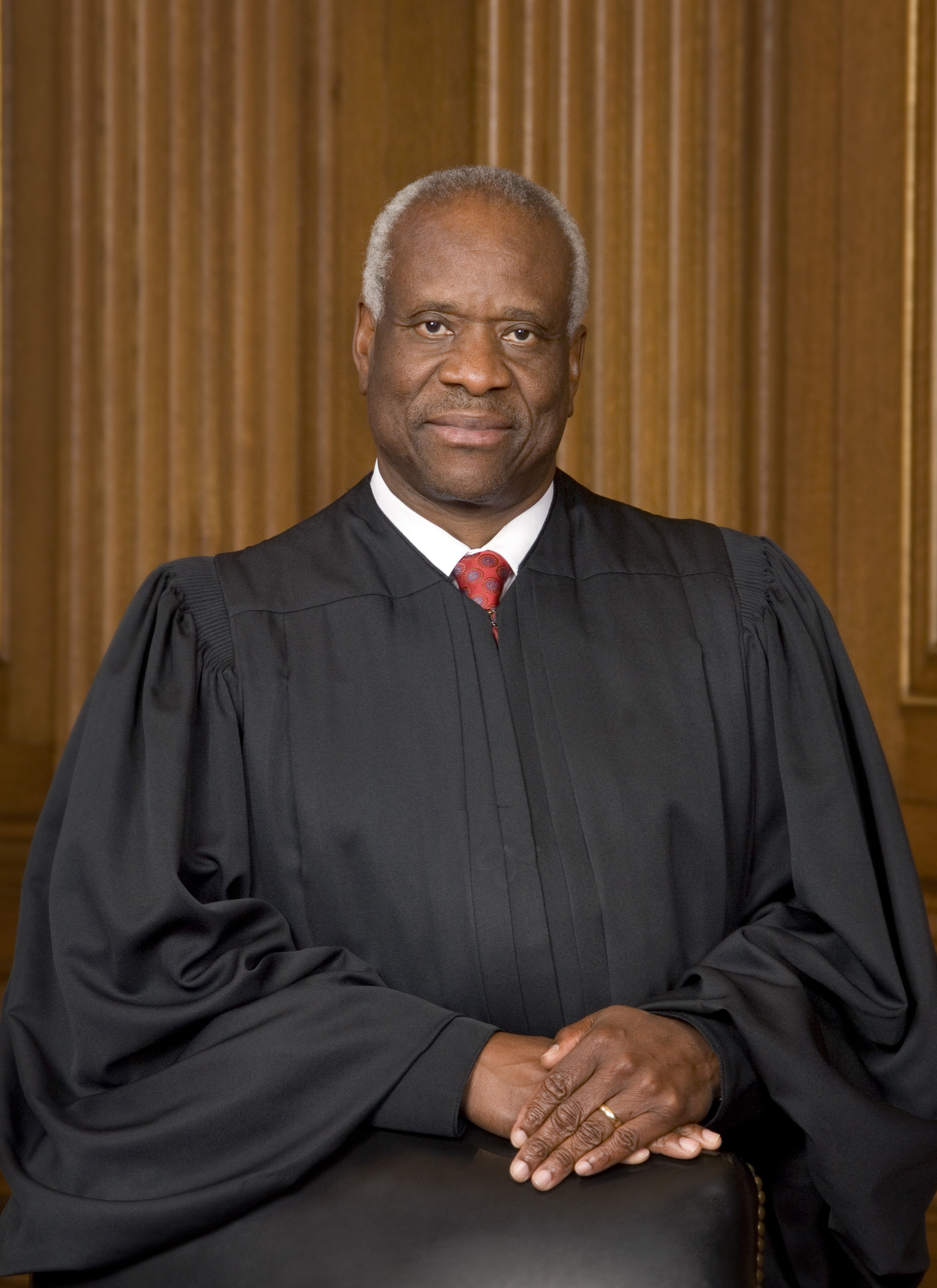

Clarence Thomas 2009 term statistics

8	Majority or plurality	14	Concurrence	0	Other
5	Dissent	1	Concurrence/dissent	Total =	28
Bench opinions = 26		Opinions relating to orders = 2		In-chambers opinions = 0
Unanimous opinions: 2		Most joined by: Scalia (15)		Least joined by: Ginsburg, Breyer (5)

Type	Case	Citation	Issues	Joined by	Other opinions
	Mohawk Industries, Inc. v. Carpenter	558 U.S. 100 (2009)	appealability of disclosure orders adverse to attorney–client privilege • collateral order doctrine		Sotomayor
	McDaniel v. Brown	558 U.S. 120 (2010)	habeas corpus • sufficiency of the evidence review • DNA evidence	Scalia	per curiam
	Presley v. Georgia	558 U.S. 209 (2010)	Sixth Amendment • right to public trial • exclusion of public from jury voir dire	Scalia	per curiam
	Citizens United v. Federal Election Comm'n	558 U.S. 310 (2010)	campaign finance reform • Bipartisan Campaign Reform Act of 2002 • First Amendment • free speech • corporate speech		Kennedy; Roberts; Scalia; Stevens
	Johnson v. Bredesen	558 U.S. 1067 (2009)	Eighth Amendment • death penalty		Stevens
Thomas concurred in the Court's denial of certiorari.
	Wilkins v. Gaddy	559 U.S. 34 (2010)	Eighth Amendment • use of excessive force	Scalia	per curiam
	Maryland v. Shatzer	559 U.S. 98 (2010)	Fifth Amendment • Miranda rights • release to general prison population as break in custody		Scalia; Stevens
	Reed Elsevier, Inc. v. Muchnick	559 U.S. 154 (2010)	copyright law • prelitigation registration requirement • subject matter jurisdiction	Roberts, Scalia, Kennedy, Alito	Ginsburg
	Bloate v. United States	559 U.S. 196 (2010)	Speedy Trial Act • exclusion of time granted to prepare pretrial motions	Roberts, Stevens, Scalia, Kennedy, Ginsburg, Sotomayor	Ginsburg; Alito
	Milavetz, Gallop & Milavetz, P. A. v. United States	559 U.S. 229 (2010)	Bankruptcy Abuse Prevention and Consumer Protection Act of 2005 • bankruptcy attorneys as debt relief agencies		Sotomayor; Scalia
	United Student Aid Funds, Inc. v. Espinosa	559 U.S. 260 (2010)	bankruptcy law • undue hardship discharge of student loan debt • failure to serve creditor with summons and complaint	Unanimous	
	Berghuis v. Smith	559 U.S. 314 (2010)	Sixth Amendment • right to impartial jury representing cross-section of community		Ginsburg
	Jones v. Harris Associates	559 U.S. 335 (2010)	Investment Company Act of 1940 • investment advisor compensation as breach of fiduciary duty		Alito
	Perdue v. Kenny A.	559 U.S. 542 (2010)	Civil Rights Attorney's Fees Award Act of 1976 • calculation of attorney's fees		Alito; Kennedy; Breyer
	Noriega v. Pastrana	559 U.S. 917 (2010)	Military Commissions Act of 2006 • Third Geneva Convention • extradition of prisoner of war • habeas corpus • Suspension Clause	Scalia	
Thomas dissented from the Court's denial of certiorari in a proceeding brought by former Panamanian dictator Manuel Noriega to challenge his extradition to France upon his release from federal prison.
	Graham v. Florida	560 U.S. 48 (2010)	Eighth Amendment • cruel and unusual punishment • sentencing of juveniles to life imprisonment for nonhomicide crimes	Scalia; Alito (in part)	Kennedy; Roberts; Stevens; Alito
	United States v. Comstock	560 U.S. 126 (2010)	Necessary and Proper Clause • civil commitment of mentally ill, sexually dangerous prisoners	Scalia (in part)	Breyer; Kennedy; Alito
	United States v. O'Brien	560 U.S. 218 (2010)	use of machine gun in federal crime as element or sentencing factor		Kennedy; Stevens
	Hardt v. Reliance Standard Life Ins. Co.	560 U.S. 242 (2010)	Employee Retirement Income Security Act of 1974 • award of attorney's fees	Roberts, Scalia, Kennedy, Ginsburg, Breyer, Alito, Sotomayor; Stevens (in part)	Stevens
	Samantar v. Yousuf	560 U.S. 305 (2010)	Foreign Sovereign Immunities Act • immunity for officials of foreign states		Stevens; Scalia; Alito
	Levin v. Commerce Energy, Inc.	560 U.S. 413 (2010)	discriminatory state taxation • comity	Scalia	Ginsburg; Kennedy; Alito
	Carachuri-Rosendo v. Holder	560 U.S. 563 (2010)	Immigration and Nationality Act • discretionary cancellation of removal proceedings • drug possession as aggravated felony		Stevens; Scalia
	Astrue v. Ratliff	560 U.S. 586 (2010)	Equal Access to Justice Act • award of attorney's fees • administrative offset to satisfy debt to government	Unanimous	Sotomayor
	Schwab v. Reilly	560 U.S. 770 (2010)	bankruptcy law • Chapter 7 • trustee objections to claimed estate exemptions	Stevens, Scalia, Kennedy, Alito, Sotomayor	Ginsburg
	Doe v. Reed	561 U.S. 186 (2010)	public disclosure of referendum petitions • First Amendment • free speech		Roberts; Stevens; Scalia; Breyer; Alito; Sotomayor
	Granite Rock Co. v. Teamsters	561 U.S. 287 (2010)	Labor Management Relations Act • arbitration of collective bargaining agreement ratification date	Roberts, Scalia, Kennedy, Ginsburg, Breyer, Alito; Stevens, Sotomayor (in part)	Sotomayor
	Magwood v. Patterson	561 U.S. 320 (2010)	habeas corpus • Antiterrorism and Effective Death Penalty Act of 1996 • claims in second or successive applications	Scalia; Stevens, Breyer, Sotomayor (in part)	Breyer; Kennedy
	McDonald v. Chicago	561 U.S. 742 (2010)	Second Amendment • Fourteenth Amendment • Incorporation Doctrine • gun control		Alito; Scalia; Stevens; Breyer
