= 2009 term United States Supreme Court opinions of Samuel Alito =

The 2009 term of the Supreme Court of the United States began October 5, 2009, and concluded October 4, 2010. This was the fifth term of Associate Justice Samuel Alito's tenure on the Court.
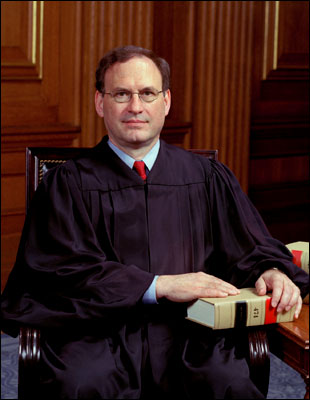

Samuel Alito 2009 term statistics

8	Majority or plurality	10	Concurrence	0	Other
8	Dissent	0	Concurrence/dissent	Total =	26
Bench opinions = 25		Opinions relating to orders = 1		In-chambers opinions = 0
Unanimous opinions: 2		Most joined by: Roberts (10)		Least joined by: Stevens, Sotomayor (4)

Type	Case	Citation	Issues	Joined by	Other opinions
	Bobby v. Van Hook	558 U.S. 4 (2009)	Sixth Amendment • ineffective assistance of counsel		per curiam
Alito joined the Court's per curiam opinion, which had reversed the lower court for resolving an ineffective assistance of counsel claim by applying guidelines published by the American Bar Association nearly twenty years after the trial. Alito filed a separate concurrence to emphasize his understanding that the Supreme Court's opinion "in no way suggests that the [ABA Guidelines] have special relevance in determining whether an attorney’s performance meets the standard required by the Sixth Amendment." Pointing out that the ABA "is a private group with limited membership," Alito observed that its views are not necessarily reflective of American lawyers as a whole. It is instead the responsibility of the courts to determine what conduct by an attorney meets constitutional standards, and Alito saw "no reason why the ABA Guidelines should be given a privileged position in making that determination."
	Wellons v. Hall	558 U.S. 220 (2010)	habeas corpus • procedural default • GVR orders	Roberts	per curiam; Scalia
	Kucana v. Holder	558 U.S. 233 (2010)	Illegal Immigration Reform and Immigrant Responsibility Act of 1996 • ban on judicial review of discretionary actions by Attorney General		Ginsburg
	South Carolina v. North Carolina	558 U.S. 256 (2010)	state apportionment of the Catawba River waters • intervention by municipal entity in original action	Stevens, Scalia, Kennedy, Breyer	Roberts
	Johnson v. United States	559 U.S. 133 (2010)	Armed Career Criminal Act • state battery conviction as predicate violent felony	Thomas	Scalia
	Mac's Shell Service, Inc. v. Shell Oil Products Co.	559 U.S. 175 (2010)	Petroleum Marketing Practices Act • constructive termination	Unanimous	
	Bloate v. United States	559 U.S. 196 (2010)	Speedy Trial Act • exclusion of time granted to prepare pretrial motions	Breyer	Thomas; Ginsburg
	Jones v. Harris Associates	559 U.S. 335 (2010)	Investment Company Act of 1940 • investment advisor compensation as breach of fiduciary duty	Unanimous	Thomas
	Padilla v. Kentucky	559 U.S. 356 (2010)	Sixth Amendment • ineffective assistance of counsel • legal advice on deportation as consequence of conviction	Roberts	Stevens; Scalia
	United States v. Stevens	559 U.S. 460 (2010)	criminalization of depictions of animal cruelty • First Amendment • free speech		Roberts
	Perdue v. Kenny A.	559 U.S. 542 (2010)	Civil Rights Attorney's Fees Award Act of 1976 • calculation of attorney's fees	Roberts, Scalia, Kennedy, Thomas	Kennedy; Thomas; Breyer
	Stolt-Nielsen S. A. v. AnimalFeeds Int'l Corp.	559 U.S. 662 (2010)	Federal Arbitration Act • class arbitration	Roberts, Scalia, Kennedy, Thomas	Ginsburg
	Salazar v. Buono	559 U.S. 700 (2010)	Article III • standing • First Amendment • Establishment Clause • display of religious symbol on government land • land transfer from government to private owner		Kennedy; Roberts; Scalia; Stevens; Breyer
	Nurre v. Whitehead	559 U.S. 1025 (2010)	First Amendment • free speech • student speech in public schools • public forum doctrine		
Alito dissented from the Court's denial of certiorari.
	Graham v. Florida	560 U.S. 48 (2010)	Eighth Amendment • cruel and unusual punishment • sentencing of juveniles to life imprisonment for nonhomicide crimes		Kennedy; Roberts; Stevens; Thomas
	United States v. Comstock	560 U.S. 126 (2010)	Necessary and Proper Clause • civil commitment of mentally ill, sexually dangerous prisoners		Breyer; Kennedy; Thomas
	Samantar v. Yousuf	560 U.S. 305 (2010)	Foreign Sovereign Immunities Act • immunity for officials of foreign states		Stevens; Scalia; Thomas
	Levin v. Commerce Energy, Inc.	560 U.S. 413 (2010)	discriminatory state taxation • comity		Ginsburg; Kennedy; Thomas
	Carr v. United States	560 U.S. 438 (2010)	Sex Offender Registration and Notification Act • registration requirements for interstate travel • ex post facto application	Thomas, Ginsburg	Sotomayor; Scalia
	Hamilton v. Lanning	560 U.S. 505 (2010)	bankruptcy law • Chapter 13 • Bankruptcy Abuse Prevention and Consumer Protection Act of 2005 • calculation of debtor's projected disposal income	Roberts, Stevens, Kennedy, Thomas, Ginsburg, Breyer, Sotomayor	Scalia
	Holland v. Florida	560 U.S. 631 (2010)	Antiterrorism and Effective Death Penalty Act of 1996 • statute of limitations • equitable tolling		Breyer; Scalia
	Monsanto Co. v. Geertson Seed Farms	561 U.S. 139 (2010)	Plant Protection Act • deregulation of genetically modified plants • Article III • standing	Roberts, Scalia, Kennedy, Thomas, Ginsburg, Sotomayor	Stevens
	Doe v. Reed	561 U.S. 186 (2010)	public disclosure of referendum petitions • First Amendment • free speech		Roberts; Stevens; Scalia; Breyer; Sotomayor; Thomas
	Skilling v. United States	561 U.S. 358 (2010)	Enron scandal • Sixth Amendment • Article III • change of venue • juror prejudice from pretrial publicity • honest services fraud		Ginsburg; Scalia; Sotomayor
	Christian Legal Soc. Chapter of Univ. of Cal., Hastings College of Law v. Martinez	561 U.S. 661 (2010)	nondiscrimination policy for university student organizations • First Amendment • free speech • public forum doctrine	Roberts, Scalia, Thomas	Ginsburg; Stevens; Kennedy
	McDonald v. Chicago	561 U.S. 742 (2010)	Second Amendment • Fourteenth Amendment • Incorporation Doctrine • gun control	Roberts, Scalia, Kennedy; Thomas (in part)	Scalia; Thomas; Stevens; Breyer
