= 2009 term United States Supreme Court opinions of John Roberts =

The 2009 term of the Supreme Court of the United States began October 5, 2009, and concluded October 3, 2010. This was the fifth term of Chief Justice John Roberts's tenure on the Court.
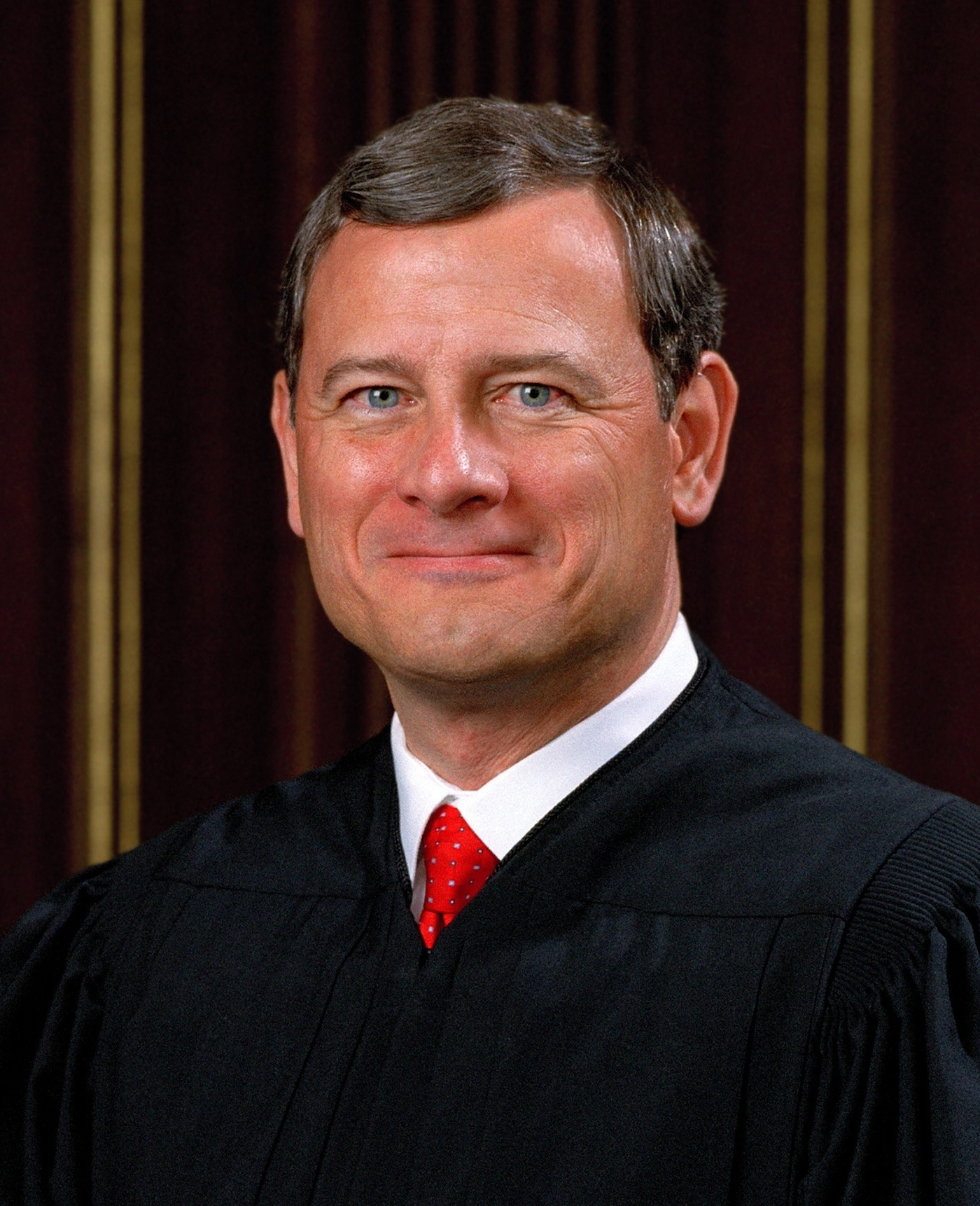

John Roberts 2009 term statistics

8	Majority or plurality	3	Concurrence	2	Other
4	Dissent	2	Concurrence/dissent	Total =	19
Bench opinions = 15		Opinions relating to orders = 2		In-chambers opinions = 2
Unanimous opinions: 0		Most joined by: Scalia (11)		Least joined by: Breyer (3)

Type	Case	Citation	Issues	Joined by	Other opinions
	Beard v. Kindler	558 U.S. 53 (2009)	habeas corpus review • adequate and independent state ground doctrine • discretionary state procedural rules	Stevens, Scalia, Kennedy, Thomas, Ginsburg, Breyer, Sotomayor	Kennedy
	South Carolina v. North Carolina	558 U.S. 256 (2010)	state apportionment of the Catawba River waters • intervention by municipal entity in original action	Thomas, Ginsburg, Sotomayor	Alito
	Citizens United v. Federal Election Comm'n	558 U.S. 310 (2010)	campaign finance reform • Bipartisan Campaign Reform Act of 2002 • First Amendment • free speech • corporate speech	Alito	Kennedy; Scalia; Stevens; Thomas
	Virginia v. Harris	558 U.S. 978 (2009)	Fourth Amendment • investigative stops • drunk driving	Scalia	
Roberts dissented from the Court's denial of certiorari. The Virginia Supreme Court had ruled that a police officer violated the Fourth Amendment when he stopped a driver reported to be drunk and driving dangerously, because the officer did not first independently verify that he was driving dangerously. Roberts questioned the wisdom of this rule given the imminent danger posed by drunk driving, characterizing the effect of the decision as "to grant drunk drivers 'one free swerve' before they can be pulled over by the police." Roberts noted that lower courts had split on the issue of when and whether the Fourth Amendment required independent verification. "Maybe the decision of the Virginia Supreme Court was correct," he wrote, "and the Fourth Amendment bars police from acting on anonymous tips of drunk driving unless they can verify each tip. If so, then the dangerous consequences of this rule are unavoidable. But the police should have every legitimate tool at their disposal for getting drunk drivers off the road. I would grant certiorari to determine if this is one of them."
	Hemi Group, LLC v. City of New York	559 U.S. 1 (2010)	Racketeer Influenced and Corrupt Organizations Act • Jenkins Act • local taxation of online cigarette sales • lost tax revenue as injury to municipality	Scalia, Thomas, Alito; Ginsburg (in part)	Ginsburg; Breyer
	Machado v. Holder	559 U.S. 966 (2010)	ineffective assistance of counsel	Scalia, Thomas, Alito	
Roberts dissented from the Court's summary granting of certiorari, vacatur of the lower Court's opinion, and remand of the case.
	United States v. Stevens	559 U.S. 460 (2010)	criminalization of depictions of animal cruelty • First Amendment • free speech	Stevens, Scalia, Kennedy, Thomas, Ginsburg, Breyer, Sotomayor	Alito
	Conkright v. Frommert	559 U.S. 506 (2010)	Employee Retirement Income Security Act of 1974 • standard of review of plan administrator interpretration	Scalia, Kennedy, Thomas, Alito	Breyer
	Salazar v. Buono	559 U.S. 700 (2010)	Article III • standing • First Amendment • Establishment Clause • display of religious symbol on government land • land transfer from government to private owner		Kennedy; Scalia; Alito; Stevens; Breyer
	Renico v. Lett	559 U.S. 766 (2010)	Fifth Amendment • Double Jeopardy Clause • retrial after mistrial	Scalia, Kennedy, Thomas, Ginsburg, Alito	Stevens
	Jackson v. District of Columbia Board of Elections and Ethics	559 U.S. 1301 (2010)	Same-sex marriage in the District of Columbia • local referendum process		
Roberts denied an application for a stay of the D.C. Religious Freedom and Civil Marriage Equality Amendment Act, which legalized same-sex marriage in Washington, D.C. effective March 3, 2010.
	Graham v. Florida	560 U.S. 48 (2010)	Eighth Amendment • cruel and unusual punishment • sentencing of juveniles to life imprisonment for nonhomicide crimes		Kennedy; Stevens; Thomas; Alito
	Robertson v. United States ex rel. Watson	560 U.S. 272 (2010)	criminal contempt proceedings initiated by private action	Scalia, Kennedy, Sotomayor	per curiam; Sotomayor
Roberts dissented from the Court's per curiam dismissal of the writ of certiorari as improvidently granted.
	Alabama v. North Carolina	560 U.S. 330 (2010)	Southeast Interstate Low-Level Radioactive Waste Compact	Thomas	Scalia; Kennedy; Breyer
	Dolan v. United States	560 U.S. 605 (2010)	Mandatory Victims Restitution Act • deadline for restitution order	Stevens, Scalia, Kennedy	Breyer
	Holder v. Humanitarian Law Project	561 U.S. 1 (2010)	USA Patriot Act • nonviolent training and expert advice as material support to terrorism • standing • Fifth Amendment • Due Process Clause • First Amendment • free speech • freedom of association	Stevens, Scalia, Kennedy, Thomas, Alito	Breyer
	Doe v. Reed	561 U.S. 186 (2010)	public disclosure of referendum petitions • First Amendment • free speech	Kennedy, Ginsburg, Breyer, Alito, Sotomayor	Stevens; Scalia; Breyer; Alito; Sotomayor; Thomas
	Free Enterprise Fund v. Public Company Accounting Oversight Bd.	561 U.S. 477 (2010)	Sarbanes-Oxley Act of 2002 • Public Company Accounting Oversight Board • separation of powers • Appointments Clause	Scalia, Kennedy, Thomas, Alito	Breyer
	Lux v. Rodrigues	561 U.S. 1306 (2010)	signatures required to appear on congressional ballot		
Roberts denied an application for an injunction.
