= United States v. Seale =

Federal criminal case in the United States

United States v. Seale is a federal criminal case in the United States, in which Ku Klux Klan member James Ford Seale was prosecuted and convicted for his role in the racially motivated murders in 1964 of two black teens.

The case was procedurally unusual in that it was initiated in 2007, and it was unclear whether the statute of limitations had expired due to revision of the governing criminal statute in the interim. The trial court ruled against Seale on the issue, which was affirmed by an evenly divided appellate court. The appellate court then took the highly unusual step of seeking certification of the legal question to the Supreme Court of the United States, seeking guidance on whether the revisions retroactively changed the applicable limitations period. The Supreme Court dismissed the certification without comment.

== Background ==
The case has its beginnings in the 1964 kidnapping of two black teenagers. After they had been beaten, they had weights attached and were thrown into the Mississippi River to drown. After an investigation, James Ford Seale and another man, allegedly members of the Ku Klux Klan, were indicted for the murder. The charges were dropped because, it was later alleged, the police were colluding with the Klan. Nevertheless, the House Committee on Un-American Activities called Seale to testify and placed its belief that he had committed the crime in its records. Seale then dropped off the radar, and was thought dead until 2005. In 2007, he was indicted by the federal government for the crime.

== The case and the timeliness issue ==
The federal kidnapping statute doesn't specify a time limit on prosecutions, so the general limits of 18 U.S.C. §§ 3281 and 3282 supply the time limit on prosecution, if there is any. There is no time limit on a capital crime (section 3281), but non-capital crimes are subject to a five-year statute of limitations (section 3282). Seale moved to dismiss the indictment on the theory that the latter applied to him. Although kidnapping was a capital offense in 1964, Congress detached the death penalty from it in the mid-1970s in response to United States v. Jackson, 390 U.S. 570 (1968), and Furman v. Georgia, 408 U.S. 238 (1972). This should be given retroactive effect, Seale contended, making his offense subject to section 3282's five year limit, and the indictment accordingly untimely. The district court rejected this argument. The case proceeded to trial, the jury found Seale guilty on all counts (helped, no doubt, by an FBI agent's testimony that Seale had admitted the crime after his arrest), and three life sentences ensued.

On appeal, Seale raised seven issues, but a panel of the United States Court of Appeals for the Fifth Circuit decided only one of them. It embraced Seale's argument that the prosecution was time-barred; because that decision terminated the case, the panel did not address the remaining issues. The full Fifth Circuit agreed to hear the case en banc, vacating the panel's decision. Although the en banc court decided to hear the case, however, it could not decide how to decide the case, dividing nine to nine. The upshot was that the panel opinion was vacated, and the district court's denial of Seale's motion was nominally affirmed without opinion. The case was remanded to the panel for consideration of the remaining six issues raised on appeal.

Rather than await the panel's decision or appeal, Seale asked the Fifth Circuit to invoke a rarely used procedure. 28 U.S.C. § 1254(2) and Supreme Court Rule 19 allow a federal court of appeals to certify a question to the Supreme Court, bypassing (to an extent) the usual appellate process. The procedure is not commonly used; only four cases certified have been accepted by the court in more than sixty years, the last one in 1981. Nevertheless, on Seale's motion, a majority of the Fifth Circuit agreed to certify the question of whether section 3281 or 3282 is controlling for a kidnapping that occurred in 1964.

Judge Harold DeMoss, writing for the majority, premised certification both on the unusual posture of the particular case and its implications for the broader considerations at issue, noting that the government is investigating several other cases from the 1960s that may raise the same question of time limits. Writing for the four dissenters, Chief Judge Edith Jones noted that the Supreme Court was unlikely to take the case, that the Department of Justice had not made it clear that other cases involving the same question are in the pipeline, as the majority had contended, and that certification was inappropriate when the panel might dispose of the case on other grounds on remand.

It is in the discretion of the Supreme Court to answer certified questions or not. The court has indicated that such actions are disfavored, and it has rarely taken such cases, but such cases have been taken before.

== Supreme Court dismissal ==
The Supreme Court dismissed the certified question on November 2, 2009. In a statement respecting the dismissal joined by Justice Antonin Scalia, Justice John Paul Stevens wrote:

This certificate presents us with a pure question of law that may well determine the outcome of a number of cases of ugly racial violence remaining from the 1960s ... [and which is] narrow, debatable, and important. I recognize that the question reaches us in an interlocutory posture, ... [y]et I see no benefit and significant cost to postponing the question’s resolution. A prompt answer from this Court will expedite the termination of this litigation and determine whether other similar cases may be prosecuted. In these unusual circumstances, certification can serve the interests not only of legal clarity but also of prosecutorial economy and the proper administration and expedition of judicial business.

The case will now return to the District Court for consideration of the residuum of issues, per the Fifth Circuit's original en banc decision.
