= Astrue v. Ratliff =

- Supreme Court of the United States

Decided June 14, 2010
- Full case name: Astrue v. Ratliff
- Citations: 560 U.S. 586 (more)

Holding
- The government can reduce the fee award due to a person who has successfully sued the government to cover that person's preexisting debts to the government.

Court membership
- Chief Justice John Roberts Associate Justices John P. Stevens · Antonin Scalia; Anthony Kennedy · Clarence Thomas; Ruth Bader Ginsburg · Stephen Breyer; Samuel Alito · Sonia Sotomayor

Case opinions
- Majority: Thomas, joined by unanimous
- Concurrence: Sotomayor, joined by Stevens, Ginsburg

Astrue v. Ratliff, 560 U.S. 586 (2010), was a United States Supreme Court case in which the court held that the government can reduce the fee award due to a person who has successfully sued the government to cover that person's preexisting debts to the government.

== Background ==
Catherine G. Ratliff was Ruby Kills Ree's attorney in Ree's successful suit against the United States Social Security Administration for Social Security benefits. The federal District Court granted Ree's unopposed motion for attorney's fees under the Equal Access to Justice Act (EAJA), which provides that "a court shall award to a prevailing party... fees and other expenses... in any civil action... brought by or against the United States."

Before paying the fees award, the Government discovered that Ree owed the United States a debt that predated the award. Accordingly, the government sought an administrative offset against the award under 31 U. S. C. §3716, which subjects to offset all "funds payable by the United States," to an individual who owes certain delinquent federal debts unless, for example, payment is exempted by statute or regulation. The parties to this case did not establish that any such exemption applied to §2412(d) fees awards, which, as of 2005, were covered by the Treasury Department's Offset Program (TOP).

After the Government notified Ree that it would apply TOP to offset her fees award against a portion of her debt, Ratliff intervened, challenging the offset on the grounds that §2412(d) fees belong to a litigant's attorney and thus may not be used to satisfy the litigant's federal debts. The District Court held that because §2412(d) directs that fees be awarded to the "prevailing party," not to her attorney, Ratliff lacked standing to challenge the offset. The Eighth Circuit Court of Appeals reversed, holding that under its precedent, EAJA attorney's fees are awarded to prevailing parties' attorneys.

== Opinion of the court ==
The Supreme Court issued an opinion on June 14, 2010.

Although she concurred with the majority, Justice Sonia Sotomayor opined that it was unlikely that Congress had considered this sort of question when it passed the EAJA. If Congress had considered this, Sotomayor thought it was unlikely that Congress would have wanted EAJA fee awards to be subject to offset because such offsets undercut the effectiveness of that program. Sotomayor also observed that the Treasury Department had independently started TOP in 2005, but the statute under which the Treasury Department authorized TOP was passed in 1996 and did not explicitly authorize such a program.
