= Kawasaki Kisen Kaisha Ltd. v. Regal-Beloit Corp. =

- Supreme Court of the United States

Decided June 17, 2010
- Full case name: Kawasaki Kisen Kaisha Ltd. v. Regal-Beloit Corp.
- Citations: 561 U.S. 89 (more)

Holding
- When a cargo shipment begins overseas, portions of the trip when the goods are traveling over land by train are governed by the Carriage of Goods by Sea Act, not the Carmack Amendment to the Interstate Commerce Act.

Court membership
- Chief Justice John Roberts Associate Justices John P. Stevens · Antonin Scalia; Anthony Kennedy · Clarence Thomas; Ruth Bader Ginsburg · Stephen Breyer; Samuel Alito · Sonia Sotomayor

Case opinions
- Majority: Kennedy
- Dissent: Sotomayor, joined by Stevens, Ginsburg

Laws applied
- Carriage of Goods by Sea Act

Kawasaki Kisen Kaisha Ltd. v. Regal-Beloit Corp., 561 U.S. 89 (2010), was a United States Supreme Court case in which the Court held that, when a cargo shipment begins overseas, portions of the trip when the goods are traveling over land by train are governed by the Carriage of Goods by Sea Act, not the Carmack Amendment to the Interstate Commerce Act.
