= Hamilton v. Lanning =

- Supreme Court of the United States

Decided June 7, 2010
- Full case name: Hamilton v. Lanning
- Citations: 560 U.S. 505 (more)

Holding
- When a bankruptcy court calculates a debtor's projected disposable income, the court may account for changes in the debtor's income or expenses that are known or virtually certain at the time of confirmation.

Court membership
- Chief Justice John Roberts Associate Justices John P. Stevens · Antonin Scalia; Anthony Kennedy · Clarence Thomas; Ruth Bader Ginsburg · Stephen Breyer; Samuel Alito · Sonia Sotomayor

Case opinions
- Majority: Alito, joined by Roberts, Stevens, Kennedy, Thomas, Ginsburg, Breyer, Sotomayor
- Dissent: Scalia

Hamilton v. Lanning, 560 U.S. 505 (2010), was a United States Supreme Court case in which the court held that when a bankruptcy court calculates a debtor's projected disposable income, the court may account for changes in the debtor's income or expenses that are known or virtually certain at the time of confirmation.
