= Dillon v. United States =

- Supreme Court of the United States

Decided June 17, 2010
- Full case name: Dillon v. United States
- Citations: 560 U.S. 817 (more)

Holding
- When a defendant receives a resentencing hearing after the Sentencing Guidelines have changed in their favor, the updated Guidelines are binding on the district court at resentencing, even though the court could treat them as merely advisory if it was sentencing the defendant for the first time.

Court membership
- Chief Justice John Roberts Associate Justices John P. Stevens · Antonin Scalia; Anthony Kennedy · Clarence Thomas; Ruth Bader Ginsburg · Stephen Breyer; Samuel Alito · Sonia Sotomayor

Dillon v. United States, 560 U.S. 817 (2010), was a United States Supreme Court case in which the court held that, when a defendant receives a resentencing hearing after the Sentencing Guidelines have changed in their favor, the updated Guidelines are binding on the district court at resentencing, even though the court could treat them as merely advisory if it was sentencing the defendant for the first time.

== Background ==
In 1993, Dillon was convicted of, among other things, crack and powder cocaine offenses, which produced a base offense level of 38 and a Guidelines range of 262-to-327 months' imprisonment. The court sentenced him at the bottom of the range for those counts. After the United States Sentencing Commission amended the Guidelines to reduce the base offense level associated with each quantity of crack cocaine and made that amendment retroactive, Dillon moved for a sentence reduction under 18 U.S.C. §3582(c)(2). That provision authorizes a district court to reduce an otherwise final sentence pursuant to a Guidelines amendment if a reduction is consistent with the commission's policy statements. The relevant policy statement, USSG §1B1.10, precludes a court from reducing a sentence "to a term that is less than the minimum of the amended guidelines range" except in limited circumstances. In addition to the two-level reduction authorized by the amendment, Dillon sought a variance below the amended Guidelines range, contending that United States v. Booker authorized the exercise of such discretion. The District Court imposed a sentence at the bottom of the revised range but declined to grant a further reduction. Finding Booker inapplicable to §3582(c)(2) proceedings, the court concluded that the commission's directives in §1B1.10 constrained it to impose a sentence within the amended Guidelines range. The Third Circuit Court of Appeals affirmed.

== Opinion of the court ==
The Supreme Court issued an opinion on June 17, 2010.

Justice Sonia Sotomayor delivered the opinion of the Court. The Court affirmed the judgment of the Third Circuit, holding that the rule established in United States v. Booker, which made the Federal Sentencing Guidelines advisory in ordinary sentencing proceedings, does not apply in the same manner to sentence-reduction proceedings under 18 U.S.C. § 3582(c)(2). The Court reasoned that § 3582(c)(2) authorizes only a limited modification of an otherwise final sentence rather than a full resentencing.

The Court described § 3582(c)(2) as establishing a two-step inquiry. First, the district court must determine whether a sentence reduction is authorized under the Sentencing Commission's policy statement in USSG § 1B1.10 and determine the extent of the reduction permitted by that policy. Second, the court considers the applicable sentencing factors in 18 U.S.C. § 3553(a) to determine whether the authorized reduction is warranted in whole or in part under the circumstances of the case.

The Court also rejected Dillon's argument that treating the Commission's policy statement as binding violated the Sixth Amendment. It distinguished sentence-modification proceedings from original sentencing proceedings, reasoning that § 3582(c)(2) proceedings cannot increase a defendant's punishment and instead give courts limited discretion to reduce an existing sentence. The Court characterized § 3582(c)(2) as a congressional act of lenity allowing some prisoners to benefit from retroactive changes to the Sentencing Guidelines.
