= Dolan v. United States =

- Supreme Court of the United States

Decided April 20, 2010
- Full case name: Dolan v. United States
- Citations: 560 U.S. 605 (more)

Holding
- A sentencing court that misses the 90-day deadline nonetheless retains the power to order restitution where that court made clear prior to the deadline's expiration that it would order restitution.

Court membership
- Chief Justice John Roberts Associate Justices John P. Stevens · Antonin Scalia; Anthony Kennedy · Clarence Thomas; Ruth Bader Ginsburg · Stephen Breyer; Samuel Alito · Sonia Sotomayor

Case opinions
- Majority: Breyer, joined by Thomas, Ginsburg, Alito, Sotomayor
- Dissent: Roberts, joined by Stevens, Scalia, Kennedy

Dolan v. United States, 560 U.S. 605 (2010), was a United States Supreme Court case in which the court held that a sentencing court that misses the 90-day deadline nonetheless retains the power to order restitution where that court made clear prior to the deadline's expiration that it would order restitution.

== Background ==
Brian Russell Dolan pleaded guilty to assault resulting in serious bodily injury and entered into a plea agreement, which stated that the federal District Court could order restitution for his victim. Dolan's pre-sentence report also noted that restitution was required, but it did not recommend an amount because of a lack of information on hospital costs and lost wages. The Mandatory Victims Restitution Act provides that "if the victim's losses are not ascertainable by the date that is 10 days prior to sentencing," the court "shall set a date for the final determination of the victim's losses, not to exceed 90 days after sentencing." On July 30, the District Court held a sentencing hearing and imposed a sentence of imprisonment and supervised release. On August 8, the court entered a judgment, stating that restitution was "applicable" but leaving open the amount of restitution given that no information had yet "been received regarding possible restitution payments." On October 5, 67 days later, an addendum documenting the restitution amount was added to the presentence report. The court did not set a hearing until February 4, about three months after the 90-day deadline had expired. At the hearing, Dolan argued that because that deadline had passed, the law no longer authorized restitution. Disagreeing, the court ordered restitution, and the Tenth Circuit Court of Appeals affirmed.

== Opinion of the court ==
The Supreme Court issued an opinion on April 20, 2010.
