= Wood v. Allen =

- Supreme Court of the United States

Decided January 20, 2010
- Full case name: Wood v. Allen
- Citations: 558 U.S. 290 (more)

Holding
- The state court's conclusion that the petitioner's counsel made a strategic decision not to pursue or present evidence of his mental deficiencies was not an unreasonable determination of the facts.

Court membership
- Chief Justice John Roberts Associate Justices John P. Stevens · Antonin Scalia; Anthony Kennedy · Clarence Thomas; Ruth Bader Ginsburg · Stephen Breyer; Samuel Alito · Sonia Sotomayor

Case opinions
- Majority: Sotomayor
- Dissent: Stevens, joined by Kennedy

Wood v. Allen, 558 U.S. 290 (2010), was a United States Supreme Court case in which the Court held that the state court's conclusion that the petitioner's counsel made a strategic decision not to pursue or present evidence of his mental deficiencies was not an unreasonable determination of the facts. The Court therefore denied the habeas corpus petition. Having thus disposed of the claim, the Court declined to decide the issues the petition raised about interpreting the Antiterrorism and Effective Death Penalty Act.
