= Alvarez v. Smith =

- Supreme Court of the United States

Argued October 14, 2009 Decided December 8, 2009
- Full case name: Alvarez, Cook County State's Attorney v. Smith, et al.
- Docket no.: 08-351
- Citations: 558 U.S. 87 (more) 130 S. Ct. 576; 175 L. Ed. 2d 447
- Argument: Oral argument
- Opinion announcement: Opinion announcement

Case history
- Prior: Smith v. City of Chicago, 524 F.3d 834 (7th Cir. 2008); cert. granted, 555 U.S. 1169 (2009).

Holding
- Case dismissed as moot because the parties agreed that there was no longer contention over the property seized.

Court membership
- Chief Justice John Roberts Associate Justices John P. Stevens · Antonin Scalia; Anthony Kennedy · Clarence Thomas; Ruth Bader Ginsburg · Stephen Breyer; Samuel Alito · Sonia Sotomayor

Case opinions
- Majority: Breyer, joined by Roberts, Scalia, Kennedy, Thomas, Ginsburg, Alito, Sotomayor; Stevens (Parts I and II)
- Concur/dissent: Stevens

Alvarez v. Smith, 558 U.S. 87 (2009), was a United States Supreme Court decision on seizure of property by the Chicago Police Department, however the case was declared moot by the Court as the parties agreed that there was no longer contention over the property seized.

== Background ==
Under the Illinois Drug Asset Forfeiture Procedure Act (DAFPA) moveable personal property used in a drug crime is subject to forfeiture and allows the police to seize property without a warrant. In addition it allows the state to keep the property for five months before judicial proceedings begin.

The respondents, all who had had property seized under the law, sued claiming that the State had failed to provide a speedy hearing to reclaim property thus violating Due Process. The District Court for the Northern District of Illinois dismissed the cases based on Seventh Circuit precedent. Respondents appealed to the Seventh Court of Appeals on the grounds that Mathews v. Eldridge requires a hearing before the seizure of real property.

The Appeals Court overruled its precedent and held that DAFPA did not provide the adequate mechanisms for owners to challenge the seizure of their property. The Court reasoned that the length of time (97 to 187 days maximum) was too long. The Seventh Circuit remanded the case back to the District Court and ordered it to devise a mechanism by which an owner can contest the seizure of his property.

== Opinion of the Court ==
The Court declined to answer the question. In oral argument the court learned that the parties no longer disputed ownership of the property in question. Therefore, the majority opinion, written by Justice Breyer, declared the case moot and vacated the judgment of the Seventh Circuit.

Justice Stevens filled a separate opinion, agreeing with Parts I and II of the Majority (which declared the case moot) however opposed Part III which declared the judgment of the Appeals Court vacated. Stevens believed judgments should not be vacated when "the party seeking relief from judgment below caused the mootness by voluntary action," citing U.S. Bancorp Mortgage Co. v. Bonner Mall Partnership.
