= Ne exeat =

Writ

At common law, ne exeat (Latin "that he not depart") is an equitable writ restraining a person from leaving the jurisdiction of the court or the state. The writ may be issued to ensure the compliance by the defendant with a court order.

The full phrase in the United States is ne exeat republica (Latin "let him not leave the republic"). The phrase ne exeat regno (Latin "let him not leave the kingdom") has also been used in English law. In 1969 Mr Justice Meggary affirmed that the order still exists under English law, and was not repealed by the passing of the Debtors Act 1869.

It is used in family law to prohibit a person from leaving or removing a child or property from the jurisdiction. In England and Wales, however, it has been mostly replaced by passport impoundment orders. Mr Justice Mostyn said in 2012, "The writ ne exeat regno is a charming historical relic but must be regarded as an anachronism given the availability of the modern form of order".

In the United States, it is still provided for in the Internal Revenue Code at 26 U.S.C. § 7402(a).
