= South Carolina v. North Carolina =

- Supreme Court of the United States

Argued October 13, 2009 Decided January 20, 2010
- Full case name: State of South Carolina v. State of North Carolina
- Citations: 558 U.S. 256 (more) 130 S. Ct. 854; 175 L. Ed. 2d 713

Court membership
- Chief Justice John Roberts Associate Justices John P. Stevens · Antonin Scalia; Anthony Kennedy · Clarence Thomas; Ruth Bader Ginsburg · Stephen Breyer; Samuel Alito · Sonia Sotomayor

Case opinions
- Majority: Alito, joined by Stevens, Scalia, Kennedy, Breyer
- Concur/dissent: Roberts, joined by Thomas, Ginsburg, Sotomayor

South Carolina v. North Carolina, 558 U.S. 256 (2010), is a case in which the Supreme Court of the United States settled a dispute between the states of South Carolina and North Carolina regarding which parties may intervene in litigation between two states over water rights. By a 5–4 vote, the Court held that an interstate water authority and the Duke Energy Corporation could intervene, while ruling unanimously that the city of Charlotte, North Carolina, could not.

== Background ==
In 1991, North Carolina's legislature passed the Interbasin Transfer Statute, which allowed for water to be transferred from one river basin into another. Only transfers greater than 2,000,000 gallons of water per day required permits, so smaller transfers were implicitly authorized without state approval. In granting or denying a permit, North Carolina's Environmental Management Commission was required to consider the necessity, reasonableness and beneficial effects, among other things, of the transfer to North Carolina's interests; there was no requirement that they assess of the impact on a downstream state. South Carolina objected to this because in times of drought, an interbasin transfer from the Catawba River (which runs through both states) could limit the amount of water available downstream in South Carolina.

== Procedural history ==
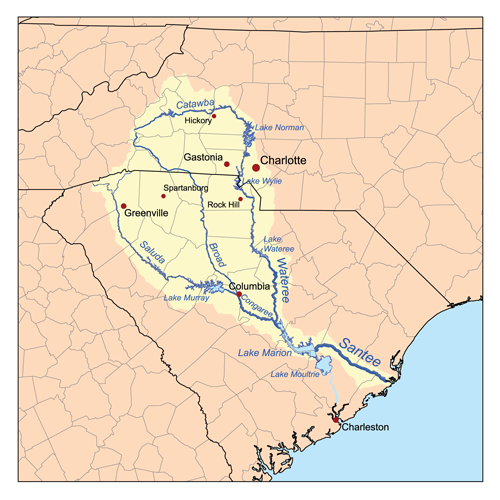
Map of the Santee River watershed showing the Catawba River

South Carolina Attorney General, Henry McMaster, filed suit against North Carolina in 2007 under the Supreme Court's original jurisdiction over suits between two states. The Court appointed Kristin Linsley as the special master to review the evidence and determine the equitable apportionment of the river's water. Linsley, a San Francisco litigation partner and former law clerk to Justice Antonin Scalia, was the first woman appointed by the Supreme Court to serve in that role. Three other parties affected by the dispute sought to intervene: the city of Charlotte, North Carolina; the Duke Energy Corporation, which operates hydroelectric power plants along the river; and the Catawba River Water Supply Project (CRWSP), a bi-state public utility that distributes water from the river to roughly 200,000 people. Linsley allowed them to join the case, and South Carolina appealed her decision to the Supreme Court.

== Discussion ==
=== Opinion of the Court ===
The Court's analysis was based on the precedent set in a similar 1953 case, New Jersey v. New York, which held that a party wishing to intervene in a suit between two states must show "some compelling interest in his own right, apart from his interest in a class with all other citizens and creatures of the state, which interest is not properly represented by the state." Based on this analysis, Justice Samuel Alito, writing for the five-member majority, found that CRWSP and Duke Energy had sufficiently different interests from the state of North Carolina to justify allowing them to intervene, but the city of Charlotte, as a subdivision of the state, did not. While Charlotte was one of the governmental bodies permitted to divert water from the Catawba, the Court found that their interests did not differ from the state as a whole. As a result, Alito wrote, "respect for 'sovereign dignity' requires us to recognize that North Carolina properly represents Charlotte in this dispute over a matter of uniquely sovereign interest."

=== Roberts's concurrence and dissent ===
Chief Justice John Roberts, writing for a four-member minority, concurred with the majority's rejection of Charlotte's attempt to intervene, but dissented to the rest of the ruling, arguing that the other two parties' intervention should also have been rejected. The dissenters noted that the Court had never before allowed private actors to intervene in a dispute between states over water rights, and that it was improper to do so now. "An interest in water is an interest shared with other citizens," Roberts wrote, "and is properly pressed or defended by the State."

== Aftermath ==
Later in 2010, North Carolina and South Carolina agreed on an out-of-court settlement that allowed transfers of water from the Catawba River. The concessions granted South Carolina were enough for the state to agree to keep the ultimate resolution of the matter out of the Supreme Court. The agreement placed no definite limits on North Carolina's withdrawals from the river, but required continuing consultation with its southern neighbor.

== Sources ==
- Davis, Mark (June 2009). "Preparing for Apportionment: Lessons from Catawba River" (PDF). Sea Grant Law and Policy Journal. 2 (1): 44–55.
- Kinnard, Meg (December 21, 2010). "SC Atty General Says Deal Settles NC Water Dispute". Yahoo News.
- Mauro, Tony (January 15, 2008). "Supreme Court First: A Female Special Master". Legal Times.
- Nelson, Gabriel (January 20, 2010). "Supreme Court Splits in Ruling on Catawba River Dispute". New York Times.
- Sarine, L. Elizabeth (2012). "The Supreme Court's Problematic Deference to Special Masters in Interstate Water Disputes". Ecology Law Quarterly. 39 (2): 535–569.
