= Hardt v. Reliance Standard Life Insurance Co. =

- Supreme Court of the United States

Decided May 24, 2010
- Full case name: Hardt v. Reliance Standard Life Insurance Co.
- Citations: 560 U.S. 242 (more)

Holding
- A fee claimant need not be a "prevailing party" to be eligible for an attorney's fees award under ERISA. Only some degree of success on the merits is required.

Court membership
- Chief Justice John Roberts Associate Justices John P. Stevens · Antonin Scalia; Anthony Kennedy · Clarence Thomas; Ruth Bader Ginsburg · Stephen Breyer; Samuel Alito · Sonia Sotomayor

Case opinions
- Majority: Thomas, joined by Roberts, Scalia, Kennedy, Ginsburg, Breyer, Alito, Sotomayor; Stevens (Parts I & II)
- Concurrence: Stevens (in part)

Laws applied
- Employee Retirement Income Security Act of 1974

Hardt v. Reliance Standard Life Insurance Co., 560 U.S. 242 (2010), was a United States Supreme Court case in which the court held that a fee claimant need not be a "prevailing party" to be eligible for an attorney's fees award under the Employee Retirement Income Security Act of 1974. Only some degree of success on the merits is required.

== Background ==
After medical problems forced Hardt to stop working, she filed for long-term disability benefits under her employer's long-term disability plan. Upon exhausting her administrative remedies, Hardt sued Reliance, her employer's disability insurance carrier, alleging that it had violated the Employee Retirement Income Security Act of 1974 (ERISA) by wrongfully denying her benefits claim. The federal District Court denied Reliance summary judgment, finding that because the carrier had acted on incomplete medical information, the benefits denial was not based on substantial evidence. Though also denying Hardt summary judgment, the court stated that it found "compelling evidence" in the record that she was totally disabled and that it was inclined to rule in her favor, but it concluded that it would be unwise to do so without giving Reliance the chance to address the deficiencies in its approach. The court therefore remanded to Reliance, giving it 30 days to consider all the evidence and to act on Hardt's application, or else the court would enter judgment in Hardt's favor. Reliance did as instructed and awarded Hardt benefits.

Hardt then filed a motion under 29 U.S.C. §1132(g)(1), a fee-shifting statute that applies in most ERISA lawsuits and provides that "the court in its discretion may allow a reasonable attorney's fee and costs... to either party." Granting the motion, the District Court applied the Circuit's framework governing attorney's fee requests in ERISA cases, concluding, among other things, that Hardt had attained the requisite "prevailing party" status. The Fourth Circuit Court of Appeals vacated the fees award, holding that Hardt had failed to establish that she qualified as a "prevailing party" under the rule set forth in Buckhannon Board & Care Home, Inc. v. West Virginia Dept. of Health and Human Resources, 532 U. S. 598, 604, that a fee claimant is a "prevailing party" only if he has obtained an "enforceable judgmen[t] on the merits " or a "court-ordered consent decre[e]." The court reasoned that because the remand order did not require Reliance to award Hardt benefits, it did not constitute an enforceable judgment on the merits.

== Opinion of the court ==
The Supreme Court issued an opinion on May 24, 2010.
