= Carr v. United States =

- Supreme Court of the United States

Decided June 1, 2010
- Full case name: Carr v. United States
- Citations: 560 U.S. 438 (more)

Holding
- SORNA, which criminalizes interstate travel for sex offenders who do not register as a sex offender in the other state, does not apply to sex offenders whose interstate travel occurred before SORNA's effective date.

Court membership
- Chief Justice John Roberts Associate Justices John P. Stevens · Antonin Scalia; Anthony Kennedy · Clarence Thomas; Ruth Bader Ginsburg · Stephen Breyer; Samuel Alito · Sonia Sotomayor

Case opinions
- Majority: Sotomayor, joined by Roberts, Stevens, Kennedy, Breyer; Scalia (except Part III-C)
- Concurrence: Scalia (in part)
- Dissent: Alito, joined by Thomas, Ginsburg

Laws applied
- Ex Post Facto Clause

Carr v. United States, 560 U.S. 438 (2010), was a United States Supreme Court case in which the court held that the Sex Offender Registration and Notification Act, which criminalizes interstate travel for sex offenders who do not register as a sex offender in the other state, does not apply to sex offenders whose interstate travel occurred before SORNA's effective date.

== Background ==
Enacted in 2006, the Sex Offender Registration and Notification Act (SORNA) makes it a federal crime for any person (1) who "is required to register under [SORNA]," and (2) who "travels in interstate or foreign commerce," to (3) "knowingly fai[l] to register or update a registration." This is codified in 18 U. S. C. §2250.

Before SORNA's enactment, petitioner Carr, a registered sex offender in Alabama, relocated to Indiana without complying with the latter State's registration requirements. Carr was indicted under §2250 post-SORNA. The federal District Court denied Carr's motion to dismiss, which asserted that the §2250 prosecution would violate the Constitution's Ex Post Facto Clause because he had traveled to Indiana before SORNA's effective date. Carr then pleaded guilty and was sentenced to prison.

Affirming the conviction, the Seventh Circuit Court of Appeals held that §2250 does not require that a defendant's travel postdate SORNA and that reliance on a defendant's pre-SORNA travel poses no ex post facto problem so long as the defendant had a reasonable time to register post-SORNA but failed to do so, as had Carr.

== Opinion of the court ==
The Supreme Court issued an opinion on June 1, 2010.
