= Littoral rights =

Legal term for access and use rights to ocean shoreline

In United States law, littoral rights are rights concerning properties that abut static water like an ocean, bay, delta, sea or lake, rather than a flowing river or stream (riparian). Littoral rights are usually concerned with the use and enjoyment of the shore, but also may include rights to use the water similar to riparian rights.

An owner whose property abuts tidal waters (i.e. oceanfront) owns the land to the mean low water line or 100 rods below mean high water, whichever is less. The land between low water and high water is reserved for the use of the public by state law and is regulated by the state. In certain states, the specific rights afforded under the doctrine of littoral rights may be spelled out by statute or case law. In Florida, for example, littoral rights encompass: "(1) the right to have access to the water; (2) the right to reasonably use the water; (3) the right to accretion and reliction; and (4) the right to the unobstructed view of the water". It has been held by the courts of Florida that "littoral rights are private property rights that cannot be taken from upland owners without just compensation".

In an 1836 speech on the floor of Congress, United States Representative Thomas L. Hamer of Ohio characterized "riparian and littoral rights" as being among the various rights created by the Constitution of the United States.

In 2005, the Michigan Supreme Court overturned an appellate court's decision on lakeshore rights of owners adjacent to the Great Lakes, that had equated wayward beach walking to trespassing. The Court said that pedestrians could walk along the beach, even though owners of property abutting the Great Lakes own that same land to the current water edge.
