= Graham County Soil & Water Conservation District v. United States ex rel. Wilson =

Graham County Soil & Water Conservation District. v. United States ex rel. Wilson
- Supreme Court of the United States

Decided March 30, 2010
- Full case name: Graham County Soil & Water Conservation District v. United States ex rel. Wilson
- Citations: 559 U.S. 280 (more)

Holding
- State "administrative" disclosures trigger the public disclosure bar within the False Claims Act.

Court membership
- Chief Justice John Roberts Associate Justices John P. Stevens · Antonin Scalia; Anthony Kennedy · Clarence Thomas; Ruth Bader Ginsburg · Stephen Breyer; Samuel Alito · Sonia Sotomayor

Case opinions
- Majority: Stevens, joined by Roberts, Kennedy, Thomas, Ginsburg, Alito; Scalia (Not Part IV)
- Concurrence: Scalia (in part)
- Dissent: Sotomayor, joined by Breyer

Laws applied
- False Claims Act
- Abrogated by
- Affordable Care Act

Graham County Soil & Water Conservation District. v. United States ex rel. Wilson, 559 U.S. 280 (2010), was a United States Supreme Court case in which the court held that state "administrative" disclosures trigger the public disclosure bar within the False Claims Act. That bar deprives courts of jurisdiction to hear qui tam suits based on misrepresentations in public disclosures by the government. This decision was abrogated by the Affordable Care Act, which explicitly limited this immunity to federal disclosures only.

== Background ==
This case reached the Supreme Court a previous time in 2005.

The False Claims Act (FCA) authorizes both the United States Attorney General and private qui tam relators to recover from persons who make false or fraudulent payment claims to the United States. However, at the time of this case, it barred qui tam actions based upon the public disclosure of allegations or transactions in, among other things, "a congressional, administrative, or Government Accounting Office [(GAO)] report, hearing, audit, or investigation." This stipulation was in 31 U.S.C. §3730(e)(4)(A).

In this case, federal contracts provided that two North Carolina counties would remediate areas damaged by flooding and that the Federal Government would shoulder most of the costs. Wilson, then an employee of a local government body involved in this effort, alerted local and federal officials about possible fraud. Both the county and the State issued reports identifying potential irregularities in the contracts' administration. Subsequently, Wilson filed a qui tam action, alleging that county conservation districts and local and federal officials (including Graham County), knowingly submitted false payment claims in violation of the FCA. The federal District Court ultimately dismissed for lack of jurisdiction because Wilson had not refuted that her action was based upon allegations publicly disclosed in the county and state reports, which it held were "administrative" reports under the FCA's public disclosure bar. In reversing, the Fourth Circuit Court of Appeals concluded that only federal administrative reports may trigger the public disclosure bar.

== Opinion of the court ==
The Supreme Court issued an opinion on March 30, 2010.

== Later developments ==
With a provision in the Affordable Care Act, Congress updated the False Claims Act to abrogate this decision. After the change, the relevant part of the statute specifies that the public disclosure bar applies when a statement made "in a congressional, Government Accountability Office, or other Federal report, hearing, audit, or investigation".

== See also ==
- Schindler Elevator Corp. v. United States ex rel. Kirk
