= Carachuri-Rosendo v. Holder =

- Supreme Court of the United States

Decided June 14, 2010
- Full case name: Carachuri-Rosendo v. Holder
- Citations: 560 U.S. 563 (more)

Holding
- The term "aggravated felonies" in 8 U.S.C. §1101(a)(43) does not mean "any conduct punishable as a felony."

Court membership
- Chief Justice John Roberts Associate Justices John P. Stevens · Antonin Scalia; Anthony Kennedy · Clarence Thomas; Ruth Bader Ginsburg · Stephen Breyer; Samuel Alito · Sonia Sotomayor

Laws applied
- 8 U.S.C. §1101(a)(43)

Carachuri-Rosendo v. Holder, 560 U.S. 563 (2010), was a United States Supreme Court case in which the court held that the term "aggravated felonies" in 8 U.S.C. §1101(a)(43) does not mean "any conduct punishable as a felony." Moreover, an immigration court cannot enhance the state offense of record after the conviction just because facts known to the immigration court would have authorized a greater penalty.

In particular, the case established that second or subsequent simple possession offenses are not "aggravated felonies" when the state conviction is not based on the fact of a prior conviction. For instance, the conduct may be an aggravated felony if the state prosecutor chose to charge the defendant as a recidivist.

== Background ==
Carachuri-Rosendo, a lawful permanent resident of the United States, faced deportation after committing two misdemeanor drug offenses in Texas. For the first, possession of a small amount of marijuana, he received 20 days in jail. For the second, possession without a prescription of one anti-anxiety tablet, he received 10 days. Texas law, like federal law, authorized a sentencing enhancement if the State proved that petitioner had been previously convicted of a similar offense, but Texas did not seek such an enhancement in the second case.

After the second conviction, the Federal Government initiated deportation proceedings. Carachuri-Rosendo conceded that he was subject to deportation, but he claimed that he was eligible for discretionary cancellation of the deportation under the Immigration and Nationality Act (INA) because he had not been convicted of any "aggravated felony." Section 1101(a)(43)(B) defines that term to include, among other things, "illicit trafficking in a controlled substance... including a drug trafficking crime" as defined in 18 U.S.C. §924(c), which, in turn, defines a "drug trafficking crime" as a "felony punishable under," among other things, "the Controlled Substances Act (21 U.S.C. 801 et seq.)." A felony is a crime for which the "maximum term of imprisonment authorized" is "more than one year." Simple possession offenses are ordinarily misdemeanors punishable with shorter sentences, but a conviction "after a prior conviction under this subchapter [or] the law of any State... has become final"—a "recidivist" simple possession offense—is "punishable" as a "felony" under §924(c)(2) and subject to a 2-year sentence. Only this "recidivist" simple possession category might be an "aggravated felony" under 8 U.S.C. §1101(a)(43). A prosecutor must charge the existence of the prior conviction. See 21 U.S.C. §851(a)(1). Notice and an opportunity to challenge its validity, §§851(b)–(c), are mandatory prerequisites to obtaining a punishment based on the fact of the prior conviction and necessary prerequisites to "authorize" a felony punishment for the simple possession offense at issue.

The Immigration Judge considering Carachuri-Rosendo's case held that the second simple possession conviction was an "aggravated felony" that made him ineligible for cancellation of the deportation. The Board of Immigration Appeals and Fifth Circuit Court of Appeals affirmed. Relying on the holding in Lopez v. Gonzales—that to be an "aggravated felony" for immigration law purposes, a state drug conviction must be punishable as a felony under federal law—the court used a "hypothetical approach," concluding that because petitioner's "conduct" could have been prosecuted as a recidivist simple possession under state law, it could have also been punished as a felony under federal law.

== Opinion of the court ==
On June 14, 2010, the Supreme Court voted unanimously to reverse the Court of Appeals ruling. Justice Stevens wrote the opinion, while Justices Scalia and Thomas wrote concurrences. The court reversed for several reasons. Among them, it clarified that Lopez did not authorize the hypothetical approach.
