= Magwood v. Patterson =

- Supreme Court of the United States

Decided June 24, 2010
- Full case name: Magwood v. Patterson
- Citations: 561 U.S. 287 (more)

Holding
- When a state prisoner obtains federal habeas corpus relief and is re-sentenced, a habeas application challenging the new judgment is not a "second or successive" challenge even if the prisoner could have challenged the original sentence on the same ground.

Court membership
- Chief Justice John Roberts Associate Justices John P. Stevens · Antonin Scalia; Anthony Kennedy · Clarence Thomas; Ruth Bader Ginsburg · Stephen Breyer; Samuel Alito · Sonia Sotomayor

Case opinions
- Majority: Thomas, joined by Scalia; Stevens, Breyer, Sotomayor (except part IV-B)
- Concurrence: Breyer (in part and in judgment), joined by Stevens, Sotomayor
- Dissent: Kennedy, joined by Roberts, Ginsburg, Alito

Laws applied
- 28 U.S.C. § 2244(b)

Magwood v. Patterson, 561 U.S. 287 (2010), was a United States Supreme Court case in which the Court held that, when a state prisoner obtains federal habeas corpus relief and is re-sentenced, a habeas application challenging the new judgment is not a "second or successive" challenge even if the prisoner could have challenged the original sentence on the same ground.

== Significance ==
In this context, the Court said the habeas petition challenged the judgment, not the state's overall custody of the petitioner. If the Court had interpreted this situation as a "second or successive challenge," the petitioner's case would have been ignored under 28 U.S.C. § 2244(b)—even if it was meritorious.
