= Perdue v. Kenny A. =

- Supreme Court of the United States

Decided April 21, 2010
- Full case name: Perdue v. Kenny A.
- Citations: 559 U.S. 542 (more)

Holding
- A federal court can award larger-than-usual attorney's fees for excellent performance in a civil rights case, but only in extraordinary circumstances.

Court membership
- Chief Justice John Roberts Associate Justices John P. Stevens · Antonin Scalia; Anthony Kennedy · Clarence Thomas; Ruth Bader Ginsburg · Stephen Breyer; Samuel Alito · Sonia Sotomayor

Case opinions
- Majority: Alito, joined by Roberts, Scalia, Kennedy, Thomas
- Concurrence: Kennedy
- Concurrence: Thomas
- Concur/dissent: Breyer, joined by Stevens, Ginsburg, Sotomayor

Perdue v. Kenny A., 559 U.S. 542 (2010), was a United States Supreme Court case in which the court held that a federal court can award larger-than-usual attorney's fees for excellent performance in a civil rights case, but only in extraordinary circumstances.

== Background ==
Kenny A. and other children in the Georgia foster-care system, and their next friends, filed a class action on behalf of 3,000 children in foster care and named as defendants the Governor of Georgia and various state officials. Claiming that deficiencies in the foster-care system in two counties near Atlanta, Georgia violated their federal and state constitutional and statutory rights, the children sought injunctive and declaratory relief, as well as attorney's fees and expenses.

The United States District Court for the Northern District of Georgia eventually referred the case to mediation, where the parties entered into a consent decree, which the federal District Court approved. The consent decree resolved all pending issues other than the fees that the children's attorneys were entitled to receive under 42 U. S. C. §1988.

Title 42 U. S. C. §1988 authorizes courts to award a "reasonable" attorney’s fee for prevailing parties in civil rights actions. Half of respondents' $14 million fee request was based on their calculation of the "lodestar," i.e., the number of hours the attorneys and their employees worked multiplied by the hourly rates prevailing in the community. The other half represented a fee enhancement for superior work and results, supported by affidavits claiming that the lodestar would be insufficient to induce lawyers of comparable skill and experience to litigate this case. Awarding fees of about $10.5 million, the District Court found that the proposed hourly rates were "fair and reasonable" but that some of the entries on counsel's billing records were vague and that the hours claimed for many categories were excessive. The court therefore cut the lodestar to approximately $6 million but enhanced that award by 75%, or an additional $4.5 million. The Eleventh Circuit Court of Appeals affirmed in reliance on its precedent.

== Opinion of the court ==
The Supreme Court issued an opinion on April 21, 2010.
