= Jerman v. Carlisle, McNellie, Rini, Kramer & Ulrich LPA =

- Supreme Court of the United States

Decided April 21, 2010
- Full case name: Jerman v. Carlisle, McNellie, Rini, Kramer & Ulrich LPA
- Citations: 559 U.S. 573 (more)

Holding
- A debt collector's ignorance of the law does not qualify as a good-faith mistake for the Fair Debt Collection Practices Act's bona fide error defense.

Court membership
- Chief Justice John Roberts Associate Justices John P. Stevens · Antonin Scalia; Anthony Kennedy · Clarence Thomas; Ruth Bader Ginsburg · Stephen Breyer; Samuel Alito · Sonia Sotomayor

Case opinions
- Majority: Sotomayor, joined by Roberts, Stevens, Thomas, Ginsburg, Breyer
- Concurrence: Breyer
- Concurrence: Scalia (in part)
- Dissent: Kennedy, joined by Alito

Laws applied
- Fair Debt Collection Practices Act

Jerman v. Carlisle, McNellie, Rini, Kramer & Ulrich LPA, 559 U.S. 573 (2010), was a United States Supreme Court case in which the court held that a debt collector's ignorance of the law does not qualify as a good-faith mistake for the Fair Debt Collection Practices Act's bona fide error defense.

== Background ==
The Fair Debt Collection Practices Act (FDCPA) imposes civil liability on "debt collector[s]" for certain prohibited debt collection practices. A debt collector who "fails to comply with any [FDCPA] provision... with respect to any person is liable to such person" for "actual damage[s]," costs, "a reasonable attorney's fee as determined by the court," and statutory "additional damages". In addition, violations of the FDCPA are deemed unfair or deceptive acts or practices under the Federal Trade Commission Act (FTC Act), which is enforced by the Federal Trade Commission (FTC). A debt collector who acts with "actual knowledge or knowledge fairly implied on the basis of objective circumstances that such act is [prohibited under the FDCPA]" is subject to civil penalties enforced by the FTC. A debt collector is not liable in any action brought under the FDCPA, however, if it "shows by a preponderance of evidence that the violation was not intentional and resulted from a bona fide error notwithstanding the maintenance of procedures reasonably adapted to avoid any such error".

A law firm and one of its attorneys (collectively Carlisle) filed a lawsuit in Ohio state court on behalf of a mortgage company to foreclose a mortgage on real property owned by Jerman. The complaint included a notice that the mortgage debt would be assumed valid unless Jerman disputed it in writing. Jerman's lawyer sent a letter disputing the debt, and, when the mortgage company acknowledged that the debt had in fact been paid, Carlisle withdrew the suit. Jerman then filed this action, contending that by sending the notice requiring her to dispute the debt in writing, Carlisle had violated §1692g(a) of the FDCPA, which governs the contents of notices to debtors.

The federal District Court, acknowledging a division of authority on the question, held that Carlisle had violated §1692g(a) but ultimately granted Carlisle summary judgment under the "bona fide error" defense. The Sixth Circuit Court of Appeals affirmed, holding that the defense was not limited to clerical or factual errors and that it extended to mistakes of law.

== Opinion of the court ==
The Supreme Court issued an opinion on April 21, 2010.
