= 2009 term per curiam opinions of the Supreme Court of the United States =

Seal of the United States Supreme Court.

The Supreme Court of the United States handed down nineteen per curiam opinions during its 2009 term, which began on October 5, 2009, and concluded October 3, 2010.

Because per curiam decisions are issued from the Court as an institution, these opinions lack the attribution of authorship or joining votes to specific justices. All justices on the Court at the time the decision was handed down are assumed to have participated and concurred unless otherwise noted.

== Court membership ==
Chief Justice: John Roberts

Associate Justices: John Paul Stevens, Antonin Scalia, Anthony Kennedy, Clarence Thomas, Ruth Bader Ginsburg, Stephen Breyer, Samuel Alito, Sonia Sotomayor

== Corcoran v. Levenhagen ==
- Full caption: Joseph E. Corcoran v. Mark Levenhagen, Superintendent, Indiana State Prison
- Citations: 558 U.S. 1; 130 S. Ct. 8; 175 L. Ed. 2d 1; 2009 U.S. LEXIS 7479; 78 U.S.L.W. 3236; 22 Fla. L. Weekly Fed. S 1
- Prior history: Petition granted sub nom., Corcoran v. Buss, 483 F. Supp. 2d 709 (N.D. Ind. 2007); rev'd, 551 F. 3d 703 (7th Cir. 2008)
- Subsequent history: On remand, writ granted, 593 F. 3d 547 (7th Cir. 2010); rehearing denied, opinion amended, 7th Cir.; vacated and remanded, sub nom. Wilson v. Corcoran, 562 U.S. ___ (2010)
- Full text of the opinion: official slip opinion · Findlaw · Justia · Legal Information Institution

558 U.S. 1
Decided October 20, 2009.
Seventh Circuit vacated and remanded.

The petitioner was convicted of murder and sentenced to death in state court. He filed a writ of habeas corpus in federal court, arguing, inter alia, that his sentence violated the Sixth Amendment. The District Court granted his petition on that basis alone and ordered the defendant to be resentenced, and did not discuss his other claims as it considered those moot. On appeal, the Seventh Circuit reversed the District Court and directed it upon remand to deny the habeas writ, without permitting the District Court to review the other claims, and without explaining why those claims should not be considered.

The Supreme Court vacated the Seventh Circuit's decision, explaining that it was error for that court to dispose of the petitioner's other claims without any explanation. The Seventh Circuit was to either permit the District Court to consider the unaddressed claims on remand, or itself explain why that consideration was not necessary.

== Bobby v. Van Hook ==
- Full caption: David Bobby, Warden v. Robert J. Van Hook
- Citations: 558 U.S. 4; 130 S. Ct. 13; 175 L. Ed. 2d 255; 2009 U.S. LEXIS 7976; 78 U.S.L.W. 3267; 22 Fla. L. Weekly Fed. S 3
- Prior history: Defendant convicted, sentenced to death; aff'd, sub nom. State v. Van Hook, No. C-85-0565, 1987 WL 11202 (Ohio App. 1987); appeal denied, 530 N.E.2d 883 (Ohio May 13, 1988); cert. denied, sub nom. Van Hook v. Ohio, 489 U.S. 1100 (1989); petition denied, sub nom. State v. Van Hook, No. C-910505, 1992 WL 308350 (Ohio App. Oct. 21, 1992); appeal denied, 608 N.E.2d 1085 (Ohio 1993); rehearing denied, 611 N.E.2d 328 (Ohio 1993); 639 N.E.2d 1199 (Ohio 1994); petition denied, sub nom. Van Hook v. Anderson, No. C-1-94-269, S.D. Ohio Aug. 7, 2003); rev'd, 444 F.3d 830 (6th Cir. 2006); vacated, en banc, 488 F.3d 411 (6th Cir. 2007); cert. denied, sub nom. Van Hook v. Hudson, 552 U.S. 1023 (2007); rev'd, sub nom. Van Hook v. Anderson, 535 F.3d 458 (6th Cir. 2008); vacated, en banc, 6th Cir., 2009; rev'd, 560 F.3d 523 (6th Cir. 2009)
- Laws applied: U.S. Const. amend. VI
- Full text of the opinion: official slip opinion · Findlaw · Justia · Legal Information Institute

558 U.S. 4
Decided November 9, 2009.
Sixth Circuit reversed and remanded.

The Sixth Circuit had granted habeas relief to the petitioner on the ground of ineffective assistance of counsel during the capital phase of his sentencing, in violation of the Sixth Amendment. The Supreme Court reversed, believing it was clear the petitioner's attorneys "met the constitutional minimum standard of competence under the correct standard." The Sixth Circuit had instead improperly relied on professional guidelines that were published many years after the trial to determine the applicable standard.

Van Hook was convicted in 1985 for aggravated robbery and aggravated murder. Using a strategy he had used since a teenager, he picked up a homosexual man at a gay bar and lured him into a secluded place to rob him; in this instance, Van Hook concluded the robbery by stabbing the victim to death and disfiguring his body. At his sentencing hearing, the defense called several witnesses, and Van Hook himself gave an unsworn statement, presenting mitigating evidence regarding Van Hook's traumatic childhood, personality disorder, and substance abuse. The court weighed the factors and sentenced him to death.

In 1995, Van Hook submitted his petition for a writ of habeas corpus, which was finally denied by the District Court in 2003. A panel of the Sixth Circuit reversed, ruling that his confession had been unconstitutionally obtained. That decision was vacated on rehearing en banc. On remand, the Sixth Circuit panel again granted the petition, finding that Van Hook's attorneys were ineffective during Van Hook's sentencing for failing to adequately investigate and present mitigating evidence, for not securing an independent mental health expert, and for failing to object to damaging evidence in an investigation report. The en banc Sixth Circuit again vacated, and remanded for the panel to revise its opinion. In its third opinion, the panel granted relief to Van Hook on the sole ground that his lawyers did not adequately investigate and present mitigating evidence, relying on the American Bar Association Guidelines for the Appointment and Performance of Defense Counsel in Death Penalty Cases published in 2003.

In reversing, the Supreme Court observed that the Sixth Amendment guarantee to criminal defendants of effective counsel is only a "general standard"—"an objective standard of reasonableness," as explained in the governing case, Strickland v. Washington, 466 U.S. 668 (1984). Restatements of professional standards, such as the ABA Guidelines, can be useful as "guides", "but only to the extent they describe the professional norms prevailing when the representation took place." The Supreme Court ruled that the Sixth Circuit erred in treating the ABA Guidelines as "inexorable commands" rather than as "evidence of what reasonably diligent attorneys would do." The Sixth Circuit further erred in relying on Guidelines published 18 years after Van Hook went to trial, "without even pausing to consider whether they reflected the prevailing professional practice at the time of trial."

Even applying the standards prevailing at the time, the Supreme Court found that Van Hook's counsel was not ineffective. The Sixth Circuit had incorrectly characterized defense counsel as waiting until the "last minute" to begin their mitigation investigation, as the record showed counsel had repeatedly interviewed family members, contacted an expert, and reviewed Van Hook's military history months before the start of trial. The Sixth Circuit panel believed that the evidence counsel did uncover should have prompted them to seek more. The Supreme Court, however, considered that such further testimony on the same points would have added nothing of value, and the decision not to investigate further was reasonable under the circumstances.

The Supreme Court further found that the aggravating factors were strong. Van Hook was indisputably the sole perpetrator and had the intent to rob the victim from the start, even using the same strategy he had used in past robberies and deviating in this case only by killing his victim. The Sixth Circuit ultimately "focused on the number of aggravating factors instead of their weight...leading it to overstate further the effect additional mitigating evidence might have had."

Alito filed a concurrence, emphasizing his understanding that the Supreme Court's opinion "in no way suggests that the [ABA Guidelines] have special relevance in determining whether an attorney’s performance meets the standard required by the Sixth Amendment." He wrote that it is purely the responsibility of the courts to determine what work by an attorney meets constitutional standards, and he saw "no reason why the ABA Guidelines should be given a privileged position in making that determination."

== Wong v. Belmontes ==
- Full caption: Robert Wong, Warden v. Fernando Belmontes, Jr.
- Citations: 558 U.S. 15
- Prior history: Defendant convicted, sentenced to death; aff'd, 755 P.2d 310 (Cal. 1988); cert. denied, sub nom. Belmontes v. California, 488 U.S. 1034 (1989); rehearing denied, 492 U.S. 938 (1989); petition denied, sub nom. Belmontes v. Calderon, No. S–89–0736 DFL JFM (E.D. Cal., Aug. 15, 2000); rev'd, sub nom. Belmontes v. Woodford, 350 F.3d 861 (9th Cir. 2003); rehearing denied, 359 F. 3d 1079 (9th Cir. 2004); vacated, sub nom. Brown v. Belmontes, 544 U.S. 945 (2005); rev'd, 414 F. 3d 1094 (9th Cir. 2005); rev'd, sub nom. Ayers v. Belmontes, 549 U.S. 7 (2006); rev'd, 529 F.3d 834 (9th Cir. 2008)
- Laws applied: U.S. Const. amend. VI
- Full text of the opinion: official slip opinion · Findlaw · Justia · Legal Information Institute

558 U.S. 15
Decided November 16, 2009.
Ninth Circuit reversed and remanded.

For the third time, the Supreme Court set aside the Ninth Circuit's reversal of a death sentence in a California murder case. The Supreme Court ruled that the petitioner's claim of ineffective assistance of counsel, in violation of the Sixth Amendment, failed the two-prong test under Strickland v. Washington, 466 U.S. 668 (1984), because he could not establish that prejudice resulted even if his attorney's performance was constitutionally deficient.

In 1981, Belmontes broke into a woman's home in Victor, California, and bludgeoned her to death, repeatedly striking her in the head with a steel bar. He and his accomplices then stole the victim's stereo, sold it for $100, and used the money to buy beer and drugs for the night. Belmontes was convicted of murder in state court in 1982. During the sentencing phase, his defense attorney successfully excluded evidence he had committed another murder, for which he had served time only as an accessory, though the court warned that the prior murder could be admissible as rebuttal evidence if the defense made it an issue. Constrained by that limit, the defense attorney nevertheless presented several witnesses, and testimony from Belmontes himself, regarding the abuse he suffered as a child, and his religious conversion while in jail on the accessory charge. The jury returned a sentence of death.

The District Court denied Belmontes' petition for habeas relief, and the Ninth Circuit reversed, finding error in the jury's instructions. The Supreme Court summarily vacated that decision and remanded for reconsideration in light of Brown v. Payton, 544 U.S. 133 (2005). On remand, the Ninth Circuit reaffirmed its decision, and the Supreme Court reversed in Ayers v. Belmontes, 549 U.S. 7 (2006). On remand, the Ninth Circuit again granted Belmontes relief, this time on the basis of ineffective assistance of counsel during the sentencing phase of his trial.

In Wong v. Belmontes, the Supreme Court again reversed, holding that Belmontes failed to establish the showing of prejudice required by Strickland, regardless of whether his attorney's performance was constitutionally deficient. The Supreme Court criticized the Ninth Circuit for changing its view of the case; the same panel of judges that characterized the mitigation evidence presented as merely "cursory" in its most recent opinion had characterized the same evidence as "substantial" in its first opinion. Though the Ninth Circuit ruled that Belmontes was prejudiced by his attorney's failure to present even more evidence to "humanize" him, the Supreme Court disagreed, finding that such evidence would either be merely cumulative, or would have opened the door for the admissibility of evidence of the prior murder. The Supreme Court dismissed as "fanciful" the notion that the jury's result could have been different if only the defense attorney had called more witnesses, in light of the circumstances of the murder. The Supreme Court took particular issue with the Ninth Circuit's assertion that the case did not involve "needless suffering", given that the motive for the murder was petty burglary, and the victim had been beaten 15-20 times on the head, suffered defensive wounds that indicated a struggle, and remained alive in that state until shortly after police found her.

Stevens filed a concurrence. He criticized the Supreme Court's prior decision, from which he had dissented, and stated that he strongly disagreed with the decision to review the case again. Stevens agreed, however, with the Court's present conclusion that the failure to present additional mitigating evidence probably did not affect the outcome.

== Porter v. McCollum ==
- Full caption: George Porter, Jr. v. Bill McCollum, Attorney General of Florida, et al.
- Citations: 558 U.S. 30
- Prior history: Defendant convicted, sentenced to death, Porter v. State (1988); aff'd in part, 564 So. 2d 1060 (Fla. 1990); petition denied; aff'd, 788 So. 2d 917 (Fla. 2001); petition granted, sub nom. Porter v. Crosby, No. 6:03-cv-1465, 2007 WL 1747316 (M.D. Fla. June 18, 2007); rev'd, 552 F.3d 1260 (11th Cir. 2008)
- Laws applied: U.S. Const. amend. VI
- Full text of the opinion: official slip opinion · Findlaw · Justia · Legal Information Institute

558 U.S. 30
Decided November 30, 2009.
Eleventh Circuit reversed and remanded.

The Supreme Court reversed the death sentence of a Korean War veteran who suffered from post-traumatic stress disorder, ruling that his defense attorney's failure to uncover or present any mitigating evidence regarding his military service or his mental health deprived him of the effective assistance of counsel in violation of the Sixth Amendment.

Porter was convicted in 1987 of murdering his ex-girlfriend and her boyfriend in Melbourne, Florida. He represented himself at trial, but eventually pleaded guilty and then was represented by a court-appointed attorney during the penalty phase. That attorney failed to uncover or present any evidence of Porter's mental health, his family background, or his military service. The sum total of the mitigating evidence presented was instead inconsistent testimony about Porter's behavior when intoxicated and testimony that Porter had a good relationship with his son. The jury recommended a sentence of death.

Porter filed a postconviction petition in 1995. The reviewing state trial court conducted a 2-day evidentiary hearing, during which Porter presented extensive mitigating evidence that was apparently unknown to his penalty-phase attorney. His siblings testified to the physical abuse Porter suffered from their father and witnessed towards his mother. Porter enlisted in the Army at age 17 to fight in the Korean War, and his company commander testified at the hearing regarding his service. Porter fought in the brutal battles of Kunuri and Chipyong, was wounded twice, and earned medals for his service.

The trial court denied his postconviction petition, not reaching the issue of whether his attorney's performance was deficient, but finding that the failure to present this evidence did not prejudice Porter at trial. It discounted the evidence of his military service in light of his AWOL periods. The Florida Supreme Court affirmed. Porter next filed a petition for habeas relief in federal court. The District Court granted his petition, granting him a new sentencing hearing. The Eleventh Circuit reversed, in deference to the state court's judgment.

In reversing, the Supreme Court held that the decision of Porter's attorney not to investigate did not reflect reasonable professional judgment.

Regarding the second prong of the Strickland test, whether that deficiency prejudiced the results of Porter's trial, the judge and jury at Porter’s original sentencing heard almost nothing that would humanize Porter or allow them to accurately gauge his moral culpability.

Our Nation has a long tradition of according leniency to veterans in recognition of their service, especially for those who fought on the front lines as Porter did. Moreover, the relevance of Porter’s extensive combat experience is not only that he served honorably under extreme hardship and gruesome conditions, but also that the jury might find mitigating the intense stress and mental and emotional toll that combat took on Porter. Porter, slip op. at 14.

== Michigan v. Fisher ==
- Full caption: Michigan v. Jeremy Fisher
- Citations: 558 U.S. 45
- Prior history: Motion to suppress evidence and dismiss indictment granted, Mich. Cir. Ct., Wayne Co.; rev'd and remanded for hearing, No. 256027, 2005 WL 3481454 (Mich. App. Dec. 20, 2005) (per curiam); motion to suppress and dismiss indictment granted, Mich. Cir. Ct., Wayne Co., Dec. 19, 2006; aff'd, No. 276439, 2008 WL 786515 (Mich. App. Mar. 25, 2008); leave to appeal denied, 765 N.W.2d 19 (Mich. 2009)
- Laws applied: U.S. Const. amend. IV
- Full text of the opinion: official slip opinion · Findlaw · Justia

558 U.S. 45
Decided December 7, 2009.
Court of Appeals of Michigan reversed and remanded.

Jeremy Fisher was charged under Michigan law with assault with a dangerous weapon and possession of a firearm during the commission of a felony, namely pointing a long gun at a police officer who was opening Fisher's front door to enter without a warrant. The trial court suppressed the officer's statement on Fourth Amendment grounds. The Michigan Court of Appeals remanded for an evidentiary hearing, and the trial court reinstated its order to suppress. The Court of Appeals affirmed. The Michigan Supreme Court initially granted and then denied leave to appeal.

The U.S. Supreme Court reversed and remanded, ruling that the officer's attempted entry was a reasonable exception to the Fourth Amendment prohibition against unreasonable searches.

Stevens filed a dissent, joined by Sotomayor.

== McDaniel v. Brown ==
- Full caption: E.K. McDaniel, Warden, et al. v. Troy Brown
- Citations: 558 U.S. 120
- Prior history: Defendant convicted, Nev. Dist. Ct., Elko Co., Sept. 30, 1994; rev'd in part, sub nom. Brown v. Nevada, 934 P.2d 235 (Nev. 1997); defendant resentenced, Nev. Dist. Ct., Elko Co., Mar. 18, 1998; aff'd, Nev., Sept. 8, 2000; postconviction petition denied, Feb. 21, 2002; aff'd, Nev., Nov. 21, 2003; habeas petition granted, sub nom. Brown v. Farwell, No: 03-00712, 2006 WL 6181129 (D. Nev. Dec. 14, 2006); aff'd, 525 F.3d 787 (9th Cir. 2008); cert. granted, 555 U.S. 1152 (2009)
- Laws applied: U.S. Const. amend. XIV
- Full text of the opinion: official slip opinion · Findlaw · Justia

558 U.S. 120
Decided January 11, 2010.
Ninth Circuit reversed and remanded.

The Court had originally granted certiorari and scheduled the case for argument, but then removed it from the calendar and decided it purely on the briefs.

Thomas filed a concurrence, joined by Scalia.

== Hollingsworth v. Perry ==
- Full caption: Dennis Hollingsworth, et al. v. Kristin M. Perry, et al
- Citations: 558 U.S. 183
- Prior history: Order requesting limited broadcast of trial, N.D. Cal. Jan. 7, 2010; mandamus petition denied, 9th Cir. Jan. 8, 2010; order granted, 9th Cir. Jan. 8, 2010
- Subsequent history: Judgment for plaintiffs, 704 F. Supp. 2d 921 (N.D. Cal. 2010); stay granted pending appeal, No. 10-16696, 9th Cir. Aug. 16, 2010
- Laws applied: 28 U.S.C. § 2071(b); N.D. Cal. Local Rule 77-3
- Full text of the opinion: official slip opinion · Findlaw · Justia

558 U.S. 183
Decided January 13, 2010.
Application for stay granted.

Breyer filed a dissent, joined by Stevens, Ginsburg, and Sotomayor.

== Presley v. Georgia ==
- Full caption: Eric Presley v. Georgia
- Citations: 558 U.S. 209
- Prior history: Defendant convicted, Ga. Sup. Ct., DeKalb Cty; motion for new trial denied, Ga. Sup. Ct.; affirmed, 658 S.E. 2d 773 (Ga. Ct. App. 2008); affirmed, 674 S.E. 2d 909 (Ga. 2009)
- Laws applied: U.S. Const. amend. VI
- Full text of the opinion: official slip opinion · FindLaw · Justia · Legal Information Institute

558 U.S. 209
Decided January 19, 2010.
Supreme Court of Georgia reversed and remanded.

Thomas filed a dissent, joined by Scalia.

== Wellons v. Hall ==
- Full caption: Marcus A. Wellons v. Hilton Hall, Warden
- Citations: 558 U.S. 220
- Prior history: Defendant convicted, sentenced to death; affirmed, 463 S.E. 2d 868 (Ga. 1995); petition denied, N.D. Ga.; affirmed, 554 F. 3d 923 (11th Cir. 2009)
- Subsequent history: Reversed and remanded, No. 07-13086, 11th Cir., Apr. 19, 2010.
- Full text of the opinion: official slip opinion · FindLaw · Justia · Legal Information Institute

558 U.S. 220
Decided January 19, 2010.
Eleventh Circuit vacated and remanded.

Scalia filed a dissent, joined by Thomas. Alito filed a dissent, joined by Roberts.

== Briscoe v. Virginia ==
In Briscoe v. Virginia, 559 U.S. 32 (2010), the Court vacated the Supreme Court of Virginia's judgment and remanded for further proceedings not inconsistent with Melendez-Diaz v. Massachusetts, 557 U.S. 305 (2009).

== Wilkins v. Gaddy ==
- Full caption: Jamie Wilkins v. Officer Gaddy
- Citations: 559 U.S. 34
- Prior history: Complaint dismissed sua sponte, No. 08–00138 (W.D.N.C. Apr. 16, 2008); motion for reconsideration denied, No. 08–00138 (W.D.N.C. Aug. 25, 2008); affirmed, 308 Fed. Appx. 696 (4th Cir. 2009)
- Laws applied: U.S. Const. amend. VIII
- Full text of the opinion: official slip opinion · FindLaw · Justia · Legal Information Institute

559 U.S. 34
Decided February 22, 2010.
Hudson v. McMillian requires courts to decide excessive force claims in the incarceration context based on the nature of the force rather than the extent of the injury.

Fourth Circuit reversed and remanded.

Thomas filed a concurrence, joined by Scalia.

== Thaler v. Haynes ==
- Full caption: Rick Thaler, Director, Texas Department of Criminal Justice, Correctional Institutions Division v. Anthony Cardell Haynes
- Citations: 559 U.S. 43
- Prior history: Defendant convicted, sentenced to death, Tex. Dist. Ct., Harris Cty; affirmed, No. 73,685 (Tex. Crim. App. Oct. 10, 2001); cert. denied, sub nom. Haynes v. Texas, 535 U.S. 999 (2002); petition denied, sub nom. Haynes v. Quarterman, 2007 WL 268374 (S.D. Tex. Jan. 25, 2007); certificate of appealability granted, 526 F. 3d 189 (5th Cir. 2008); reversed, 561 F. 3d 535 (5th Cir. 2009)
- Laws applied: U.S. Const. amend. XIV
- Full text of the opinion: official slip opinion · FindLaw · Justia · Legal Information Institute

559 U.S. 43
Decided February 22, 2010.
Fifth Circuit reversed and remanded. A summary reversal without oral argument.

Anthony Cardell Haynes was tried in a Texas court after the murder of a police officer.

For purposes of an AEDPA challenge, no Supreme Court decision "clearly establishes" that a judge, in ruling on an objection to a peremptory challenge under Batson v. Kentucky, must reject a demeanor-based explanation for the challenge unless the judge personally observed and recalls the aspect of the prospective juror's demeanor on which the explanation is based.

== Kiyemba v. Obama ==
- Full caption: Jamal Kiyemba et al. v. Barack Obama, President of the United States et al.
- Citations: 559 U.S. 131
- Prior history: Judgment for petitioners, 581 F. Supp. 2d 33 (D.D.C. 2008); reversed, 555 F. 3d 1022 (D.C. Cir. 2009; cert. granted, 558 U.S. 969 (2009)
- Subsequent history: Opinion reinstated, 605 F. 3d 1046 (D.C. 2010); cert. denied, 563 U.S. ___ (2011)
- Full text of the opinion: official slip opinion · Findlaw · Justia

559 U.S. 131
Decided March 1, 2010.
District of Columbia Circuit vacated and remanded.

Twenty-two members of a Chinese ethnic minority called Uyghurs were captured by U.S. forces at a terrorist training camp shortly after the beginning of the Afghanistan War. They were imprisoned at the Guantanamo Bay detention camp despite the fact that they were not designated enemy combatants. U.S. law prevents them from being released back to China because, as terrorists, they would be tortured or executed.

The Uyghurs challenged their detention on the basis of habeas corpus, demanding their freedom even if it meant releasing them into the U.S. Meanwhile, the detainees have received at least one offer of resettlement in another country. All but five have accepted those offers. The remaining five have in fact rejected two such offers.

No court had yet ruled on this case in light of the offers of resettlement. Therefore the Supreme Court declined to rule on the question of whether a federal court has the right to release the prisoners held at Guantanamo Bay. Said the court, "We are a court of review, not of first view."

== Sullivan v. Florida ==
In Sullivan v. Florida, 560 U.S. 181 (2010), the Court dismissed the writ of certiorari as improvidently granted.

== Robertson v. United States ex rel. Watson ==
- Full caption: John Robertson v. United States ex rel. Wykenna Watson
- Citations: 560 U.S. 272
- Prior history: Defendant convicted, D.C. Sup. Ct.; aff'd, sub nom. In re Robertson, 940 A.2d 1050 (D.C. 2008); cert. granted, 558 U.S. 1090
- Full text of the opinion: official slip opinion · Findlaw · Justia

560 U.S. 272
Argued March 31, 2010.
Decided May 24, 2010.
The Court dismissed the writ of certiorari as improvidently granted.

Roberts filed a dissent, joined by Scalia, Kennedy, and Sotomayor. Sotomayor filed a dissent, joined by Kennedy, to clarify her understanding of the rule the Chief Justice proposed in his opinion.

== Jefferson v. Upton ==
- Full caption: Lawrence Joseph Jefferson v. Stephen Upton, Warden
- Citations: 560 U.S. 284
- Prior history: Petition granted, sub nom. Jefferson v. Terry, 490 F. Supp. 2d 1261 (N.D. Georgia 2007); rev'd, sub nom. Jefferson v. Hall, 570 F.3d 1283 (11th Cir. 2009)
- Full text of the opinion: official slip opinion · Findlaw · Justia

560 U.S. 284
Decided May 24, 2010.
Eleventh Circuit vacated and remanded.

Lawrence Jefferson was sentenced to death for a capital crime. He subsequently argued in state and then federal court that his lawyers had been constitutionally inadequate because they failed to investigate a traumatic head injury he sustained as a child. This injury may have caused abnormal behavior leading to limited or no impulse control.

In state court his lawyers explained that they did not pursue testing of the head injury because the case mental health expert had told them verbally that further testing was a waste of time. This explanation is disputed by the expert himself. The state court held that the defense lawyers made a reasonable investigation into his mental health and thus Jefferson's claim was rejected.

Under federal law, facts found by the state must be presumed correct, unless any of eight criteria are met, as outlined in Townsend v. Sain. On appeal, the Eleventh Circuit upheld the ruling of the state court because they were "duty bound" to accept their factual findings.

The Supreme Court found that the federal court incorrectly upheld the decision of the state court because they failed to consider seven of the eight criteria. The case was remanded back to the federal court to reconsider whether or not to accept the factual evidence found by the state by applying all eight criteria.

Scalia filed a dissent, joined by Thomas.

== United States v. Juvenile Male ==
In United States v. Juvenile Male, 560 U.S. 558 (2010), the Court granted certiorari and certified a question to the Supreme Court of Montana.

== Weyhrauch v. United States ==
In Weyhrauch v. United States, 561 U.S. 476 (2010), the Court vacated the Court of Appeals for the Ninth Circuit's judgment and remanded for further consideration in light of Skilling v. United States, 561 U.S. 358 (2010), which was handed down the same day.

== Sears v. Upton ==
- Full caption: Demarcus Ali Sears v. Stephen Upton, Warden
- Citations: 561 U.S. 945; 130 S. Ct. 3259
- Prior history: Defendant convicted, 1993; affirmed, 493 S.E. 2d 180 (Ga. 1997); petition denied, Ga. Sup. Ct., Butts Cty; affirmed, Ga.
- Laws applied: U.S. Const. amend. VI
- Full text of the opinion: official slip opinion · FindLaw · Legal Information Institute

561 U.S. 945
Decided June 29, 2010.
Supreme Court of Georgia vacated and remanded.

Having found Demarcus Ali Sears guilty of a capital crime, a Georgia court sentenced him to death despite several mitigating circumstances, including a severe cognitive impairment and an abusive childhood. Most of these mitigating circumstances were never brought out by the defense attorney during the sentencing phase of the trial. A lower court ruled that the Sears' claim of ineffective assistance of counsel, in violation of the Sixth Amendment, failed the two-prong test under Strickland v. Washington. The two parts of the test are to show that the defense was inadequate and to show that this prejudiced the outcome of the trial. The lower court ruled that although the defense attorney clearly provided an inadequate defense, there was no way to know – without speculation – whether that might have prejudiced the sentencing phase of the trial.

The Supreme Court vacated the judgment of the lower court and required them to reconsider the claim. Proper application of the prejudice test of Strickland v. Washington "requires precisely the type of probing and fact-specific analysis that the state trial court failed to undertake." Courts must undertake a point-by-point investigation of the deficiencies in the defense and reweigh the likely outcome. Courts may not perform a cursory analysis and claim that there is no way to know how the inadequate defense might have affected the outcome of the trial.

Roberts and Alito noted without separate opinion that they would deny the petition for a writ of certiorari. Scalia filed a dissent, joined by Thomas.

== See also ==
- List of United States Supreme Court cases, volume 558
- List of United States Supreme Court cases, volume 559
- List of United States Supreme Court cases, volume 560
- List of United States Supreme Court cases, volume 561
