= Ineffective assistance of counsel =

US law

In United States law, ineffective assistance of counsel (IAC) is a claim raised by a convicted criminal defendant asserting that the defendant's legal counsel performed so ineffectively that it deprived the defendant of the constitutional right guaranteed by the Assistance of Counsel Clause of the Sixth Amendment to the United States Constitution. Ineffectiveness claims may only be brought where the defendant had the right to counsel, ordinarily during the critical stages of a prosecution.

Having the "benefit of counsel" or "assistance of counsel" means that the criminal defendant has had a competent attorney representing them. Competence is defined as reasonable professional assistance and is defined in part by prevailing professional norms and standards. To prove they received ineffective assistance, a criminal defendant must show two things:

1. Deficient performance by counsel
2. Resulting prejudice, in that but for the deficient performance, there is a "reasonable probability" that the result of the proceeding would have differed.

The foregoing test was set forth in Strickland v. Washington (1984). In dissent, Justice Thurgood Marshall objected that the two-prong Strickland test was too permissive of attorney poor performance, and that the prejudice prong, in applying a form of harmless error review, would withhold relief from defendants who did not receive a fair trial, but for whom other evidence existed of their guilt. Scholars have often argued that the poor quality of appointed counsel imperils the right to counsel as guaranteed by Gideon v. Wainwright.

== The Strickland test ==
=== 1. Performance ===
To constitute ineffective counsel, a defendant's attorney's performance must have fallen below "an objective standard of reasonableness." Courts are "highly deferential," indulging a "strong presumption that counsel's conduct falls within the wide range of reasonable professional assistance." Strickland permits attorneys to make strategic decisions to emphasize one line of defense over another, so long as they are made "after thorough investigation of law and facts relevant to plausible options." Even incomplete investigations are reasonable to the extent that "reasonable professional judgements support the limitations on investigation."

The performance prong emphasizes that the attorney's performance must have been deficient at the time it was rendered, avoiding "the distorting effects of hindsight." Attorneys therefore cannot be ineffective for failing to anticipate future developments in evidence reliability or future changes in law.

Criminal convictions have been affirmed on appeal even where the defense attorney fell asleep during the prosecutor's cross-examination of the defendant, was heavily intoxicated on alcohol throughout the trial, was in extremely poor health and senile, was mentally ill (and even discussed his delusions in opening argument), or was himself a convicted felon whose sentence included community service in the form of defending accused murderers (despite his lack of experience in such cases).

Nonetheless, the Supreme Court has found notable examples of ineffectiveness. In Rompilla v. Beard, the Supreme Court faulted the defendant's lawyer for not reviewing a file that the attorney knew would be used by the prosecution in the sentencing phase of the trial. In Glover v. United States, a lawyer was held to be ineffective when he failed to object to the judge's miscalculation of the defendant's sentence. In Hinton v. Alabama, the Supreme Court held a lawyer's performance ineffective when he did not request funding for a better ballistics expert, though he was statutorily entitled to do so.

=== 2. Prejudice ===
The prejudice prong of Strickland requires that the attorney's ineffectiveness resulted in an objectively reasonable probability that the outcome of the proceeding would have been different absent the ineffectiveness. For errors of law, the defendant must also have been "deprived of a substantive or procedural right to which the law entitles him." Serving any length of time in prison longer than a defendant otherwise would have constitutes prejudice.

==== The Cronic Doctrine ====
In certain limited circumstances, the defendant need not prove prejudice at all, under the Cronic doctrine. In United States v. Cronic, the Supreme Court acknowledged that "affirmative government interference in the representation process" or the lawyer's failure to subject the prosecution's case to "meaningful adversarial testing" could constitute ineffective performance and per se prejudice.

==== The Cuyler test ====
Attorneys may have also been ineffective if they had a conflict of interest that was "inherently prejudicial." Such claims arise under the Cuyler test, which makes prejudice somewhat easier to demonstrate than ordinary Strickland claims. Attorneys may be conflicted when they are simultaneously representing multiple people with potentially adverse interests, previously represented clients who shared confidential information that may now be relevant to the current client's interests, have a personal or financial interest adverse to the client, or are part of a firm or organization that may have interests adverse to a client. Defendants may prevail on a Cuyler claim by showing that an actual conflict existed and that the conflict had an "adverse effect" on the defendant during trial, even if there would not have been a reasonable probability the outcome would have differed.

==== The McCoy doctrine ====
A defendant may also not have to demonstrate prejudice if the attorney made a key decision about the case against the client's wishes, including whether to plead guilty (McCoy v. Louisiana), whether to waive the right to a jury trial, whether to forgo an appeal, or whether the defendant wanted to testify on their own behalf.

== Guilty pleas ==
Ineffectiveness claims can be brought by defendants who pled guilty to a plea deal and did so following the bad advice of counsel. Such claims typically arise when the defendant's lawyer fails to inform their client about the "collateral" consequences of their guilty plea. Collateral consequences include the loss of the ability to vote, ineligibility for professional licensure, loss of public benefits eligibility, and immigration consequences. The Supreme Court recognized the last in Padilla v. Kentucky, when it reversed the conviction of a defendant who had been incorrectly advised by this lawyer that a guilty plea would have no immigration consequences (instead, he was slated for deportation). Some other courts, like the Georgia Supreme Court, have held counsel to be ineffective when it fails to advise the defendant of the fact that the sentence would be ineligible for parole. To satisfy the prejudice prong of Strickland, a defendant who accepted a guilty plea must show that, but for the counsel's errors, there would have been a "reasonable probability" that the defendant would have rejected it and gone to trial instead. Ineffective assistance of counsel may also be a ground for voiding a waiver of the right to appeal that a defendant may have signed as part of a plea agreement with prosecutors.

=== Forgone plea deals ===
Likewise, in Missouri v. Frye, the Supreme Court ruled that a defendant can claim ineffective assistance of counsel if they reject a plea deal that, but for bad advice of counsel, would have otherwise been accepted, maintained by the prosecutor, and accepted by the judge.

== On direct appeal ==
Ineffective assistance claims are generally preferred on collateral habeas review rather than direct appeal, so that additional fact-finding can be performed. The failure to raise ineffective assistance on direct appeal does not waive defendants' ability to raise it in habeas review, whether concerning the trial lawyer's performance or the appellate lawyer's performance, because the requirement for effective assistance of counsel applies during the defendant's direct appeal as well.

== On habeas collateral review ==
Ineffective assistance of counsel is often raised in habeas challenges because it indirectly encompasses other claims that might have been brought on direct appeal, but were waived. Thus, a defendant making a constitutional claim for the first time on habeas review would argue that it was not made earlier on direct appeal because the lawyer was then ineffective. On federal habeas review, such claims have to survive two levels of deference: first deference to the attorney's conduct, and then second a federal court's deference to the state court's first habeas review.
