= 2009 term opinions of the Supreme Court of the United States =

October 2009 to October 2010 opinions

The 2009 term of the Supreme Court of the United States began October 5, 2009, and concluded October 3, 2010. The table illustrates which opinion was filed by each justice in each case and which justices joined each opinion.

== Table key ==
Delivered the court's opinion

Joined the court's opinion

Filed a concurrence

Joined a concurrence

Filed a dissent

Joined a dissent

Filed a concurrence/dissent

Joined a concurrence/dissent

Did not participate in the decision
- Decisions that do not note an argument date were decided without oral argument. Decisions that do not note a justice delivering the court's opinion are per curiam.
- Multiple concurrences and dissents within a case are numbered, with joining votes numbered accordingly. Justices frequently join multiple opinions in a single case; each vote is subdivided accordingly.
- An asterisk ( * ) in the court's opinion denotes that it was only a majority in part or a plurality. An asterisk in a joining vote denotes that the justice joined it only in part.
- A dash ( - ) denotes that the justice voted without filing or joining an opinion.

== 2009 term opinions ==
#	Case name and citation	Argued	Decided	Roberts	Stevens	Scalia	Kennedy	Thomas	Ginsburg	Breyer	Alito	Sotomayor
1	Corcoran v. Levenhagen, 558 U.S. 1		October 20, 2009									
2	Bobby v. Van Hook, 558 U.S. 4		November 9, 2009									
3	Wong v. Belmontes, 558 U.S. 15		November 16, 2009									
4	Porter v. McCollum, 558 U.S. 30		November 30, 2009									
5	Michigan v. Fisher, 558 U.S. 45		December 7, 2009									
6	Beard v. Kindler, 558 U.S. 53	November 2, 2009	December 8, 2009									
7	Union Pacific v. Locomotive Engineers and Trainmen, 558 U.S. 67	October 7, 2009	December 8, 2009									
8	Alvarez v. Smith, 558 U.S. 87	October 14, 2009	December 8, 2009		*							
9	Mohawk Industries, Inc. v. Carpenter, 558 U.S. 100	October 5, 2009	December 8, 2009					*				
10	McDaniel v. Brown, 558 U.S. 120		January 11, 2010									
11	Smith v. Spisak, 558 U.S. 139	October 13, 2009	January 12, 2010		*							
12	NRG Power Marketing, LLC v. Maine Pub. Util. Comm'n, 558 U.S. 165	October 13, 2009	January 13, 2010									
13	Hollingsworth v. Perry, 558 U.S. 183		January 13, 2010									
14	Presley v. Georgia, 558 U.S. 209		January 19, 2010									
15	Wellons v. Hall, 558 U.S. 220		January 19, 2010	2		1		1			2	
16	Kucana v. Holder, 558 U.S. 233	November 10, 2009	January 20, 2010									
17	South Carolina v. North Carolina, 558 U.S. 256	October 13, 2009	January 20, 2010									
18	Wood v. Allen, 558 U.S. 290	November 4, 2009	January 20, 2010									
19	Citizens United v. Federal Election Comm'n, 558 U.S. 310	September 9, 2009	January 21, 2010	1	* / 1	2		* / 2* / 2	* / 1	* / 1	1 / 2	* / 1
20	Hemi Group, LLC v. City of New York, 559 U.S. 1	November 3, 2009	January 25, 2010	*					*			
21	Briscoe v. Virginia, 559 U.S. 32	January 11, 2010	January 25, 2010									
22	Wilkins v. Gaddy, 559 U.S. 34		February 22, 2010									
23	Thaler v. Haynes, 559 U.S. 43		February 22, 2010									
24	Florida v. Powell, 559 U.S. 50	December 7, 2009	February 23, 2010							* / *		
25	Hertz Corp. v. Friend, 559 U.S. 77	November 10, 2009	February 23, 2010									
26	Maryland v. Shatzer, 559 U.S. 98	October 5, 2009	February 24, 2010		1			* / 2				
27	Kiyemba v. Obama, 559 U.S. 131		March 1, 2010									
28	Johnson v. United States, 559 U.S. 133	October 6, 2009	March 2, 2010									
29	Reed Elsevier, Inc. v. Muchnick, 559 U.S. 154	October 7, 2009	March 2, 2010									
30	Mac's Shell Service, Inc. v. Shell Oil Products Co., 559 U.S. 175	January 19, 2010	March 2, 2010									
31	Bloate v. United States, 559 U.S. 196	October 6, 2009	March 8, 2010									
32	Milavetz, Gallop & Milavetz, P. A. v. United States, 559 U.S. 229	December 1, 2009	March 8, 2010			* / 1		* / 2				
33	United Student Aid Funds, Inc. v. Espinosa, 559 U.S. 260	December 1, 2009	March 23, 2010									
34	Graham Cty. ...Consv. Dist. v. United States ex rel. Wilson, 559 U.S. 280	November 30, 2009	March 30, 2010			*						
35	Berghuis v. Smith, 559 U.S. 314	January 20, 2010	March 30, 2010									
36	Jones v. Harris Associates, 559 U.S. 335	November 2, 2009	March 30, 2010									
37	Padilla v. Kentucky, 559 U.S. 356	October 13, 2009	March 31, 2010									
38	Shady Grove Orthopedic Assoc. P.A. v. Allstate Ins., 559 U.S. 393	November 2, 2009	March 31, 2010		*	*						*
39	United States v. Stevens, 559 U.S. 460	October 6, 2009	April 20, 2010									
40	Conkright v. Frommert, 559 U.S. 506	January 20, 2010	April 21, 2010									
41	Perdue v. Kenny A., 559 U.S. 542	October 14, 2009	April 21, 2010				1	2				
42	Jerman v. Carlisle, McNellie, Rini, Kramer & Ulrich LPA, 559 U.S. 573	January 13, 2010	April 21, 2010			1				2		
43	Merck & Co. v. Reynolds, 559 U.S. 633	November 30, 2009	April 27, 2010		1	2		2				
44	Stolt-Nielsen S. A. v. AnimalFeeds Int'l Corp., 559 U.S. 662	December 9, 2009	April 27, 2010									
45	Salazar v. Buono, 559 U.S. 700	October 7, 2009	April 28, 2010	1	1	2	*	2	1	2	* / 3	1
46	Renico v. Lett, 559 U.S. 766	March 29, 2010	May 3, 2010							*		
47	Hui v. Castaneda, 559 U.S. 799	March 2, 2010	May 3, 2010									
48	Abbott v. Abbott, 560 U.S. 1	January 12, 2010	May 17, 2010									
49	Graham v. Florida, 560 U.S. 48	November 9, 2009	May 17, 2010	1	2	1		1	2		1* / 2	2
50	United States v. Comstock, 560 U.S. 126	January 12, 2010	May 17, 2010			*	1				2	
51	Sullivan v. Florida, 560 U.S. 181	November 9, 2009	May 17, 2010									
52	American Needle, Inc. v. National Football League, 560 U.S. 183	January 13, 2010	May 24, 2010									
53	Lewis v. Chicago, 560 U.S. 205	February 22, 2010	May 24, 2010									
54	United States v. O'Brien, 560 U.S. 218	February 23, 2010	May 24, 2010		1			2				
55	Hardt v. Reliance Standard Life Ins. Co., 560 U.S. 242	April 26, 2010	May 24, 2010		*							
56	United States v. Marcus, 560 U.S. 258	February 24, 2010	May 24, 2010									
57	Robertson v. United States ex rel. Watson, 560 U.S. 272	March 31, 2010	May 24, 2010	1		1	1 / 2					1 / 2
58	Jefferson v. Upton, 560 U.S. 284		May 24, 2010									
59	Samantar v. Yousuf, 560 U.S. 305	March 3, 2010	June 1, 2010			1		2			3	
60	Alabama v. North Carolina, 560 U.S. 330	January 11, 2010	June 1, 2010	* / 1 / 2			*	* / 1		* / 2		*
61	Berghuis v. Thompkins, 560 U.S. 370	March 1, 2010	June 1, 2010									
62	Levin v. Commerce Energy, Inc., 560 U.S. 413	March 22, 2010	June 1, 2010			2	1	2			3	
63	Carr v. United States, 560 U.S. 438	February 24, 2010	June 1, 2010			*						
64	Barber v. Thomas, 560 U.S. 474	March 30, 2010	June 7, 2010									
65	Hamilton v. Lanning, 560 U.S. 505	March 22, 2010	June 7, 2010									
66	Krupski v. Costa Crociere S. p. A., 560 U.S. 538	April 21, 2010	June 7, 2010									
67	United States v. Juvenile Male, 560 U.S. 558		June 7, 2010									
68	Carachuri-Rosendo v. Holder, 560 U.S. 563	March 31, 2010	June 14, 2010			1		2				
69	Astrue v. Ratliff, 560 U.S. 586	February 22, 2010	June 14, 2010									
70	Dolan v. United States, 560 U.S. 605	April 20, 2010	June 14, 2010									
71	Holland v. Florida, 560 U.S. 631	March 1, 2010	June 14, 2010					*				
72	New Process Steel, L.P. v. NLRB, 560 U.S. 674	March 23, 2010	June 17, 2010									
61	Stop the Beach Renourishment v. FL Dept. of Env. Protection, 560 U.S. 702	December 2, 2009	June 17, 2010			*	* / 1		* / 2	* / 2		* / 1
74	Ontario v. Quon, 560 U.S. 746	April 19, 2010	June 17, 2010		1	* / 2						
75	Schwab v. Reilly, 560 U.S. 770	November 3, 2009	June 17, 2010									
76	Dillon v. United States, 560 U.S. 817	March 30, 2010	June 17, 2010									
77	Holder v. Humanitarian Law Project, 561 U.S. 1	February 23, 2010	June 21, 2010									
78	Rent-A-Center, West, Inc. v. Jackson, 561 U.S. 63	April 26, 2010	June 21, 2010									
79	Kawasaki Kisen Kaisha Ltd. v. Regal-Beloit Corp., 561 U.S. 89	March 24, 2010	June 21, 2010									
80	Monsanto Co. v. Geertson Seed Farms, 561 U.S. 139	April 27, 2010	June 21, 2010									
81	Doe v. Reed, 561 U.S. 186	April 28, 2010	June 24, 2010		1 / 5	2			5	1 / 3	4	5
82	Morrison v. National Australia Bank Ltd., 561 U.S. 247	March 29, 2010	June 24, 2010		1				1	2		
83	Granite Rock Co. v. Teamsters, 561 U.S. 287	January 19, 2010	June 24, 2010		*							*
84	Magwood v. Patterson, 561 U.S. 320	March 24, 2010	June 24, 2010		*			*		*		*
85	Skilling v. United States, 561 U.S. 358	March 1, 2010	June 24, 2010		*	* / 1	* / 1*	* / 1		*	* / 2	*
86	Black v. United States, 561 U.S. 465	December 8, 2009	June 24, 2010			1	2	1				
87	Weyhrauch v. United States, 561 U.S. 476	December 8, 2009	June 24, 2010									
88	Free Enterprise Fund v. Public Co. Acct. Oversight Bd., 561 U.S. 477	December 7, 2009	June 28, 2010									
89	Bilski v. Kappos, 561 U.S. 593	November 9, 2009	June 28, 2010		1	* / 2*	*		1	1 / 2		1
90	Christian Legal Soc. of Hastings College of Law v. Martinez, 561 U.S. 661	April 19, 2010	June 28, 2010		1		2					
91	McDonald v. Chicago, 561 U.S. 742	March 2, 2010	June 28, 2010		1	1		* / 2	2	2	*	2
92	Sears v. Upton, 561 U.S. 945		June 29, 2010	-							-	
#	Case name and citation	Argued	Decided	Roberts	Stevens	Scalia	Kennedy	Thomas	Ginsburg	Breyer	Alito	Sotomayor

== 2009 term membership and statistics ==
This was the fifth term of Chief Justice Roberts' tenure, the first term for Justice Sotomayor, and the last term for Justice Stevens.

Justice		Appointment history		Agreement with judgment		Opinions filed				
Seniority	Name	President	Date confirmed	%	#					Total
Chief Justice	John Roberts	George W. Bush	September 29, 2005	90.2%	83/92	8	3	2	2	15
Associate Justice	John Paul Stevens	Gerald Ford	December 19, 1975	72.5%	66/91	6	13	2	12	33
Associate Justice	Antonin Scalia	Ronald Reagan	September 26, 1986	87%	80/92	8	15	0	6	29
Associate Justice	Anthony Kennedy	Ronald Reagan	February 18, 1988	90.2%	83/92	9	8	0	4	21
Associate Justice	Clarence Thomas	George H. W. Bush	October 23, 1991	84.8%	78/92	8	13	1	4	26
Associate Justice	Ruth Bader Ginsburg	Bill Clinton	August 10, 1993	79.3%	73/92	9	3	0	3	15
Associate Justice	Stephen Breyer	Bill Clinton	August 3, 1994	76.9%	70/91	9	6	2	7	24
Associate Justice	Samuel Alito	George W. Bush	January 31, 2006	86.7%	78/90	8	10	0	7	25
Associate Justice	Sonia Sotomayor	Barack Obama	August 6, 2009	80.2%	69/86	8	2	2	4	16
Notes on statistics: Opinion counts only include the bench opinions listed above; opinions relating to orders or in-chambers opinions are not included.; Agreement with the Court's judgment does not guarantee agreement with the reasoning expressed in its opinion. A justice is not considered in agreement if they dissented even in part. Agreement percentages are based only on the listed cases in which a justice participated and are rounded to the nearest one-tenth of one percentage point.						Totals				
Notes on statistics: Opinion counts only include the bench opinions listed above; opinions relating to orders or in-chambers opinions are not included.; Agreement with the Court's judgment does not guarantee agreement with the reasoning expressed in its opinion. A justice is not considered in agreement if they dissented even in part. Agreement percentages are based only on the listed cases in which a justice participated and are rounded to the nearest one-tenth of one percentage point.						73	73	9	49	204
