= 2009 term United States Supreme Court opinions of Ruth Bader Ginsburg =

The 2009 term of the Supreme Court of the United States began October 5, 2009, and concluded October 3, 2010. This was the seventeenth term of Associate Justice Ruth Bader Ginsburg's tenure on the Court.
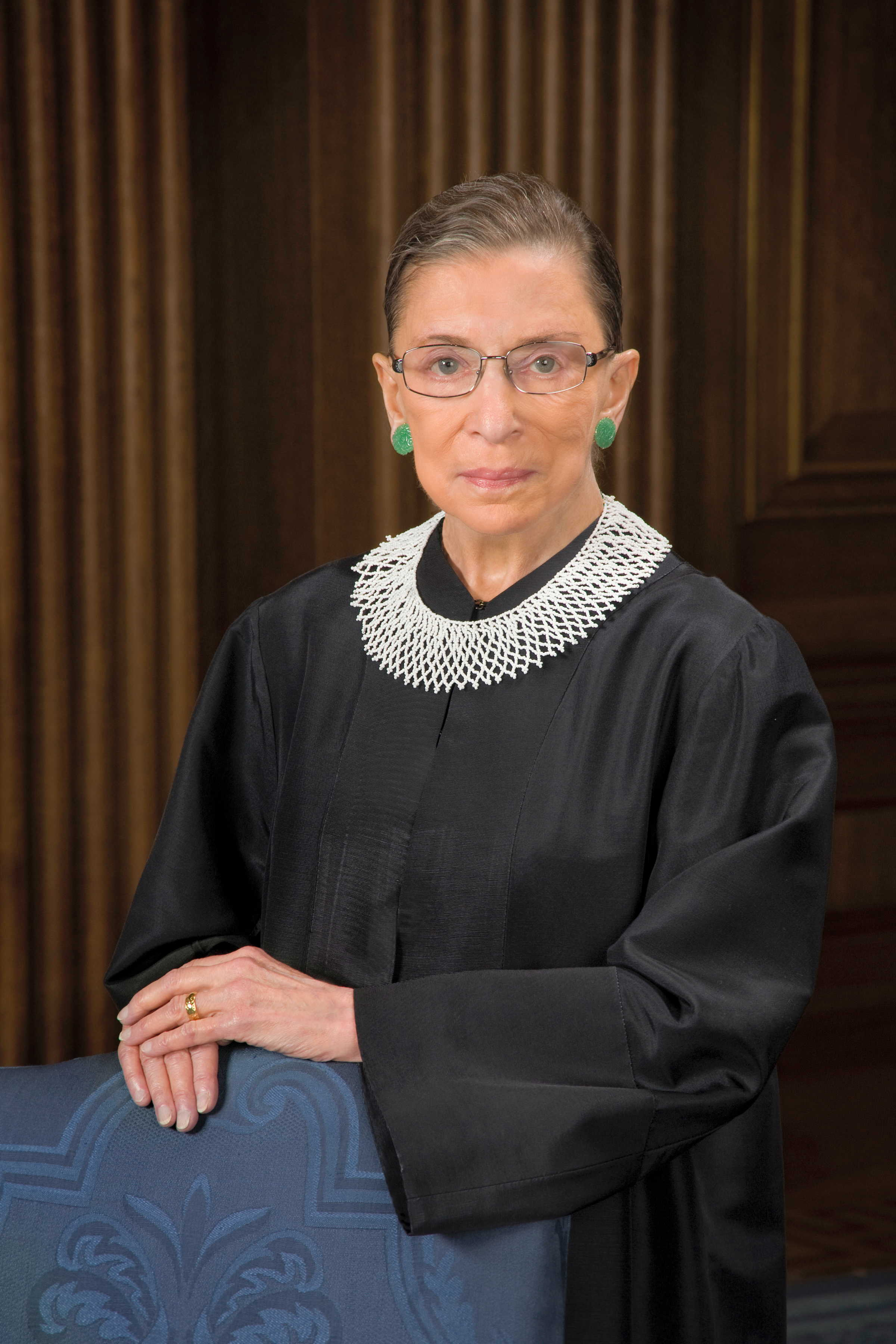

Ruth Bader Ginsburg 2009 term statistics

9	Majority or plurality	3	Concurrence	0	Other
4	Dissent	0	Concurrence/dissent	Total =	16
Bench opinions = 15		Opinions relating to orders = 1		In-chambers opinions = 0
Unanimous opinions: 2		Most joined by: Breyer (14)		Least joined by: Scalia, Thomas (6)

Type	Case	Citation	Issues	Joined by	Other opinions
	Union Pacific Railroad v. Brotherhood of Locomotive Engineers	558 U.S. 67 (2009)	Railway Labor Act • conferencing prior to National Railroad Adjustment Board arbitration	Unanimous	
	NRG Power Marketing, LLC v. Maine Pub. Util. Comm'n	558 U.S. 165 (2010)	Federal Power Act • presumption of reasonable electricity rates under wholesale energy contracts	Roberts, Scalia, Kennedy, Thomas, Breyer, Alito, Sotomayor	Stevens
	Kucana v. Holder	558 U.S. 233 (2010)	Illegal Immigration Reform and Immigrant Responsibility Act of 1996 • ban on judicial review of discretionary actions by Attorney General	Roberts, Stevens, Scalia, Kennedy, Thomas, Breyer, Sotomayor	Alito
	Hemi Group, LLC v. City of New York	559 U.S. 1 (2010)	Racketeer Influenced and Corrupt Organizations Act • Jenkins Act • local taxation of online cigarette sales • lost tax revenue as injury to municipality		Roberts; Breyer
	Florida v. Powell	559 U.S. 50 (2010)	Fifth Amendment • Miranda warning • adequate and independent state ground doctrine	Roberts, Scalia, Kennedy, Thomas, Alito, Sotomayor; Breyer (in part)	Stevens
	Reed Elsevier, Inc. v. Muchnick	559 U.S. 154 (2010)	copyright law • prelitigation registration requirement • subject matter jurisdiction	Stevens, Breyer	Thomas
	Bloate v. United States	559 U.S. 196 (2010)	Speedy Trial Act • exclusion of time granted to prepare pretrial motions		Thomas; Alito
	Berghuis v. Smith	559 U.S. 314 (2010)	Sixth Amendment • right to impartial jury representing cross-section of community	Unanimous	Thomas
	Shady Grove Orthopedic Associates, P. A. v. Allstate Ins. Co.	559 U.S. 393 (2010)	class actions • state rule conflict with Federal Rules of Civil Procedure • Rules Enabling Act	Kennedy, Breyer, Alito	Scalia; Stevens
	Stolt-Nielsen S. A. v. AnimalFeeds Int'l Corp.	559 U.S. 662 (2010)	Federal Arbitration Act • class arbitration	Stevens, Breyer	Alito
	Holster v. Gatco, Inc.	559 U.S. 1060 (2010)	Telephone Consumer Protection Act of 1991 • class actions • state rule conflict with Federal Rules of Civil Procedure	Breyer	Scalia
Ginsburg dissented from the Court's decision to grant certiorari, vacate, and remand the lower court's judgment.
	Levin v. Commerce Energy, Inc.	560 U.S. 413 (2010)	discriminatory state taxation • comity	Roberts, Stevens, Kennedy, Breyer, Sotomayor	Kennedy; Thomas; Alito
	Schwab v. Reilly	560 U.S. 770 (2010)	bankruptcy law • Chapter 7 • trustee objections to claimed estate exemptions	Roberts, Breyer	Thomas
	Skilling v. United States	561 U.S. 358 (2010)	Enron scandal • Sixth Amendment • Article III • change of venue • juror prejudice from pretrial publicity • honest services fraud	Roberts; Stevens, Scalia, Kennedy, Thomas, Breyer, Alito, Sotomayor (in part)	Scalia; Alito; Sotomayor
	Black v. United States	561 U.S. 465 (2010)	honest services fraud • Federal Rules of Criminal Procedure • preservation of objections to jury instructions	Roberts, Stevens, Breyer, Alito, Sotomayor	Scalia; Kennedy
	Christian Legal Soc. Chapter of Univ. of Cal., Hastings College of Law v. Martinez	561 U.S. 661 (2010)	nondiscrimination policy for university student organizations • First Amendment • free speech • public forum doctrine	Stevens, Kennedy, Breyer, Sotomayor	Stevens; Kennedy; Alito
