= Good conduct time =

Sentence reduction granted to well-behaved prisoners

Good conduct time, good time credit, good time, or time off for good behavior is a sentence reduction given to prisoners who maintain good behavior while imprisoned. In Florida, it is known as gain time. Good conduct time can be forfeited if a prisoner is determined to have committed disciplinary infractions and/or crimes while incarcerated. However, the vast majority of prisoners are able to routinely earn good time sentence reductions.

== History ==
In the United States, the earliest versions of "good time" or "gain time" were in place by 1850 as an alternative "to corporal punishment to motivate offenders who were not willing to work as expected". The concept was in use by 38 states by 1890 and 46 states by 1910.

In the late 19th century, American penology shifted to indeterminate sentencing and parole as the dominant early release mechanism. However, state corrections departments were reluctant to relinquish all power over early release to parole boards, which is why almost every state continued to retain some form of good time. In the 1980s, a nationwide shift back towards determinate sentencing again increased the importance of good time. In other words, the majority of prisoners again began to leave prison based upon expiration of determinate sentences as reduced by good time credit, rather than because a particular prisoner had convinced a parole board to terminate an indeterminate sentence by offering sufficient evidence of rehabilitation.

== Types of good conduct time ==
There are three basic ways to award good time. By far, the most common model is to simply award an absolute number of credits based on so many days served—by simply assuming that a prisoner had good behavior on any day on which they were not written up for violating prison rules—then reduce credits for actual violations. Emergency credits are awarded by the prison to shorten sentences to reduce severe overcrowding. Earned credits are granted as an award for voluntary choices by prisoners above and beyond ordinary good behavior: participation on certain work programs, special service in prison, or extraordinary behavior during a crisis.

== Purpose ==
Good conduct time is intended to incentivize prisoners to comply with prison rules and refrain from committing additional crimes behind bars—especially acts of violence towards other inmates and correctional officers—thereby ensuring that a prison can be run in a cost-effective manner with a higher ratio of inmates to correctional officers. Prisoners known to be uncontrollably violent (i.e., who will immediately attempt to injure or kill any human being within reach if the opportunity arises) cannot share cells or other prison facilities and must be escorted in restraints by multiple correctional officers.

Another advantage of good conduct time, from an administrative perspective, is that it can be withheld for rules violations through an internal administrative hearing process where the prisoner does not need to leave the prison. Due process requirements for such hearings are not as stringent because the prison is not extending a sentence, but only avoiding a sentence reduction that would otherwise occur. In contrast, prisoners who commit violent crimes are entitled to a jury trial if criminally charged, which presents prison administrators with the logistical difficulties of transporting the defendant and all relevant witnesses to a trial court and back to the prison.

== Federal law (United States) ==
Under United States federal law, prisoners serving more than one year in prison can get up to 54 days a year of good conduct time on the anniversary of each year they serve plus the pro rata good time applied to a partial year served at the end of their sentence, at the rate of up to 54 days per year.

Persistent controversy over calculation of good conduct time in the United States was laid to rest in the U.S. Supreme Court decision of Barber v. Thomas (2010). The First Step Act, which provides for time credits for successful participation in recidivism reduction programs, also changes how the 54 days are calculated, applying a retroactive fix that could result in the release of 4,000 prisoners.
