= List of United States Supreme Court cases, volume 560 =

This is a list of all the United States Supreme Court cases from volume 560 of the United States Reports:

Case name	Citation	Date decided
Abbott v. Abbott	560 U.S. 1	May 17, 2010
A parent's ne exeat right is a right to custody under Hague Convention on the Civil Aspects of International Child Abduction and the International Child Abduction Remedies Act.
Graham v. Florida	560 U.S. 48	May 17, 2010
Sentencing a person to life imprisonment without parole for a non-homicide crime committed before the defendant reached the age of 18 violates the Eighth Amendment.
United States v. Comstock	560 U.S. 126	May 17, 2010
The federal government may order the civil commitment of a mentally ill, sexually dangerous person beyond the conclusion of his federal sentence.
Sullivan v. Florida	560 U.S. 181	May 17, 2010
Dismissed as improvidently granted.
Am. Needle, Inc. v. NFL	560 U.S. 183	May 24, 2010
The National Football League's licensing of intellectual property in this case constitutes concerted action that is capable of violating Section 1 of the Sherman Antitrust Act.
Lewis v. City of Chicago	560 U.S. 205	May 24, 2010
Employers can be sued any time they use results from employment-eligibility tests that rule out disproportionate numbers of marginalized groups.
United States v. O'Brien	560 U.S. 218	May 24, 2010
When used by the prosecution to obtain a mandatory minimum sentence, the fact that a firearm was a machine gun is an element to be proved to the jury beyond a reasonable doubt, not a sentencing factor to be proved to the judge at sentencing.
Hardt v. Reliance Standard Life Ins. Co.	560 U.S. 242	May 24, 2010
A fee claimant need not be a "prevailing party" to be eligible for an attorney's fees award under ERISA. Only some degree of success on the merits is required.
United States v. Marcus	560 U.S. 258	May 24, 2010
An appellate court may reverse a conviction based on a plain error raised for the first time on appeal when there is a reasonable probability that the error affected the trial's outcome.
Robertson v. United States ex rel. Watson	560 U.S. 272	May 24, 2010
Dismissed as improvidently granted.
Jefferson v. Upton	560 U.S. 284	May 24, 2010
All eight of the factors from Townsend v. Sain must be evaluated before determining that a state court made a full factual determination and upholding it during a habeas hearing.
Samantar v. Yousuf	560 U.S. 305	June 1, 2010
The Foreign Sovereign Immunities Act's immunity for a "foreign state" does not include an official acting on behalf of that state.
Alabama v. North Carolina	560 U.S. 330	June 1, 2010
North Carolina was not prohibited from withdrawing from the Southeast Interstate Low-Level Radioactive Waste Management Compact, and the Southeast Compact Commission had no authority to levy monetary sanctions against North Carolina
Berghuis v. Thompkins	560 U.S. 370	June 1, 2010
A suspect's silence during interrogation does not invoke their right to remain silent under Miranda v. Arizona. The invocation of that right must be unambiguous, and silence is not enough. Voluntarily and knowingly responding to police interrogation after remaining silent constitutes a waiver of the right to remain silent, provided that a Miranda warning was given and the suspect understood it.
Levin v. Com. Energy, Inc.	560 U.S. 413	June 1, 2010
Under the comity doctrine, a taxpayer's complaint of allegedly discriminatory state taxation must proceed originally in state court even when the complaint is framed as a request to increase a competitor's tax burden.
Carr v. United States	560 U.S. 438	June 1, 2010
The Sex Offender Registration and Notification Act, which criminalizes interstate travel for sex offenders who do not register as a sex offender in the other state, does not apply to sex offenders whose interstate travel occurred before SORNA's effective date.
Barber v. Thomas	560 U.S. 474	June 7, 2010
Incarcerated people in federal prison accrue good time credits at the end of each year of actual incarceration, not an amount allocated based on the total number of years of incarceration prescribed at their sentencing.
Hamilton v. Lanning	560 U.S. 505	June 7, 2010
When a bankruptcy court calculates a debtor's projected disposable income, the court may account for changes in the debtor's income or expenses that are known or virtually certain at the time of confirmation.
Krupski v. Costa Crociere S.p.A.	560 U.S. 538	June 7, 2010
Relation back under Rule 15(c)(1)(C) depends on what the party to be added knew or should have known, not on the amending party's knowledge or timeliness in seeking to amend the pleading.
United States v. Juvenile Male	560 U.S. 558	June 7, 2010
Granted certiorari and certified a question to the Montana Supreme Court: "Is respondent's duty to remain registered as a sex offender under Montana law contingent upon the validity of the conditions of his now-expired federal juvenile-supervision order that required him to register as a sex offender, or is the duty an independent requirement of Montana law that is unaffected by the validity or invalidity of the federal juvenile-supervision conditions?"
Carachuri-Rosendo v. Holder	560 U.S. 563	June 14, 2010
The term "aggravated felonies" in 8 U.S.C. §1101(a)(43) does not mean "any conduct punishable as a felony."
Astrue v. Ratliff	560 U.S. 586	June 14, 2010
The government can reduce the fee award due to a person who has successfully sued the government to cover that person's preexisting debts to the government.
Dolan v. United States	560 U.S. 605	June 14, 2010
A sentencing court that misses the 90-day deadline nonetheless retains the power to order restitution where that court made clear prior to the deadline's expiration that it would order restitution.
Holland v. Florida	560 U.S. 631	June 14, 2010
The statute of limitations for filing a habeas petition under AEDPA is subject to equitable tolling in appropriate cases.
New Process Steel, L.P. v. NLRB	560 U.S. 674	June 17, 2010
A statute requiring the National Labor Relations Board to decide cases with a three-member quorum does not allow two of them to work despite a vacancy on the ground that they constitute a majority of the quorum.
Stop the Beach Renourishment v. Florida Department of Environmental Protection	560 U.S. 702	June 17, 2010
Florida Supreme Court did not effect an unconstitutional taking of littoral property owners' rights to future accretions and to contact the water by upholding Florida's beach renourishment program.
City of Ontario v. Quon	560 U.S. 746	June 17, 2010
Discovery of sexually explicit and otherwise personal text messages sent from police department-owned pager, resulting in disciplinary action against officer pager had been issued to, was incident to reasonable, work-related audit intended to assess efficacy of monthly character limit.
Schwab v. Reilly	560 U.S. 770	June 17, 2010
When the bankruptcy allows the debtor to exempt a dollar value corresponding to specific property from seizure by creditors, claiming the full anticipated dollar value of the property does not exempt the property from seizure if the true dollar value of the property is greater than anticipated.
Dillon v. United States	560 U.S. 817	June 17, 2010
When a defendant receives a resentencing hearing after the Sentencing Guidelines have changed in their favor, the updated Guidelines are binding on the district court at resentencing, even though the court could treat them as merely advisory if it was sentencing the defendant for the first time.
