= Milavetz, Gallop & Milavetz, P.A. v. United States =

- Supreme Court of the United States

Decided March 8, 2010
- Full case name: Milavetz, Gallop & Milavetz, P.A. v. United States
- Citations: 559 U.S. 229 (more)

Holding
- Attorneys who provide bankruptcy assistance to assisted persons are debt relief agencies under the BAPCPA.

Court membership
- Chief Justice John Roberts Associate Justices John P. Stevens · Antonin Scalia; Anthony Kennedy · Clarence Thomas; Ruth Bader Ginsburg · Stephen Breyer; Samuel Alito · Sonia Sotomayor

Case opinions
- Majority: Sotomayor, joined by Roberts, Stevens, Kennedy, Ginsburg, Breyer, Alito; Scalia (not Footnote 3); Thomas (Not Part III-C)
- Concurrence: Scalia (in part)
- Concurrence: Thomas (in part)

Laws applied
- Bankruptcy Abuse Prevention and Consumer Protection Act of 2005

Milavetz, Gallop & Milavetz, P.A. v. United States, 559 U.S. 229 (2010), was a United States Supreme Court case in which the court held that attorneys who provide bankruptcy assistance to assisted persons are debt relief agencies under the Bankruptcy Abuse Prevention and Consumer Protection Act of 2005.

== Background ==
The Bankruptcy Abuse Prevention and Consumer Protection Act of 2005 (BAPCPA) amended the Bankruptcy Code to define a class of bankruptcy professionals termed "debt relief agenc[ies]". That class includes, with limited exceptions, "any person who provides any bankruptcy assistance to an assisted person... for... payment..., or who is a bankruptcy petition preparer." The BAPCPA prohibits such professionals from "advis[ing] an assisted person... to incur more debt in contemplation of [filing for bankruptcy]...". It also requires them to disclose in their advertisements for certain services that the services are with respect to or may involve bankruptcy relief and to identify themselves as debt relief agencies.

A group of plaintiffs including the law firm Milavetz, Gallop & Milavetz, P.A. (collectively Milavetz) filed a pre-enforcement suit seeking declaratory relief, arguing that Milavetz was not bound by the BAPCPA's debt-relief-agency provisions and therefore could freely advise clients to incur additional debt without making the requisite disclosures in its advertisements. The federal District Court found that "debt relief agency" does not include attorneys and that those disclosure requirements were unconstitutional as applied to that class of professionals. The Eighth Circuit Court of Appeals affirmed in part and reversed in part, rejecting the District Court's conclusion that attorneys are not "debt relief agenc[ies]"; upholding the application of the disclosure requirements to attorneys; and holding the prohibition of advice to incur more debt unconstitutional because it banned good faith advice as well as bad faith advice.

== Opinion of the court ==
The Supreme Court issued an opinion on March 8, 2010.
