= Krupski v. Costa Crociere S.p.A. =

- Supreme Court of the United States

Decided June 7, 2010
- Full case name: Krupski v. Costa Crociere S.p.A.
- Citations: 560 U.S. 538 (more)

Holding
- Relation back under Rule 15(c)(1)(C) depends on what the party to be added knew or should have known, not on the amending party's knowledge or timeliness in seeking to amend the pleading.

Court membership
- Chief Justice John Roberts Associate Justices John P. Stevens · Antonin Scalia; Anthony Kennedy · Clarence Thomas; Ruth Bader Ginsburg · Stephen Breyer; Samuel Alito · Sonia Sotomayor

Case opinions
- Majority: Sotomayor, joined by Roberts, Stevens, Kennedy, Thomas, Ginsburg, Breyer, Alito
- Concurrence: Scalia (in part)

Laws applied
- Fed. R. Civ. P. 15(c)(1)(C)

Krupski v. Costa Crociere S.p.A., 560 U.S. 538 (2010), was a United States Supreme Court case in which the court held that relation back under Rule 15(c)(1)(C) of the Federal Rules of Civil Procedure depends on what the party to be added knew or should have known, not on the amending party's knowledge or timeliness in seeking to amend the pleading.

== Background ==
Krupski sought compensation for injuries she suffered on a cruise ship. Her passenger ticket, which was issued by Costa Cruise Lines, identified Costa Crociere S. p. A. as the carrier; required an injured party to submit to the carrier or its agent written notice of a claim; required any lawsuit to be filed within one year of the injury; and designated a specific federal District Court as the exclusive forum for lawsuits such as Krupski's. The front of the ticket listed Costa Cruise's Florida address and made references to "Costa Cruises." After Krupski's attorney notified Costa Cruise of her claims but did not reach a settlement, Krupski filed a diversity negligence action against Costa Cruise.

Over the next several months—after the limitations period had expired—Costa Cruise brought Costa Crociere's existence to Krupski's attention three times, including in its motion for summary judgment, in which it stated that Costa Crociere was the proper defendant. Krupski responded and moved to amend her complaint to add Costa Crociere as a defendant. The District Court denied Costa Cruise's summary judgment motion without prejudice and granted Krupski leave to amend. After she served Costa Crociere with an amended complaint, the court dismissed Costa Cruise from the case.

Thereafter, Costa Crociere—represented by the same counsel as Costa Cruise—moved to dismiss, contending that the amended complaint did not satisfy the requirements of Federal Rule of Civil Procedure 15(c), which governs when an amended pleading "relates back" to the date of a timely filed original pleading and is thus timely even though it was filed outside an applicable limitations period. The Rule requires that, within the Rule 4(m) 120-day period for service after a complaint is filed, the newly named defendant "knew or should have known that the action would have been brought against it, but for a mistake concerning the proper party's identity." The District Court found this condition fatal to Krupski's attempt to relate back. It concluded that she had not made a mistake about the proper party's identity because, although Costa Cruise had disclosed Costa Crociere's role in several court filings, she nonetheless delayed for months filing an amended complaint.

The Eleventh Circuit Court of Appeals affirmed, finding that Krupski either knew or should have known of Costa Crociere's identity as a potential party because she furnished the ticket identifying it to her counsel well before the limitations period ended. The court said that it was therefore appropriate to treat her as having chosen to sue one potential party over another. Additionally, the court held that relation back was not appropriate because of Krupski's undue delay in seeking to amend the complaint.

== Opinion of the court ==
The Supreme Court issued an opinion on June 7, 2010.
