= Shady Grove Orthopedic Associates, P.A. v. Allstate Ins. Co. =

- Supreme Court of the United States

Decided March 31, 2010
- Full case name: Shady Grove Orthopedic Associates, P.A. v. Allstate Ins. Co.
- Citations: 559 U.S. 393 (more)

Holding
- A Federal Rule of Civil Procedure must be applied by a federal district court situated in a state with competing rules if the Rule is "arguably procedural."

Court membership
- Chief Justice John Roberts Associate Justices John P. Stevens · Antonin Scalia; Anthony Kennedy · Clarence Thomas; Ruth Bader Ginsburg · Stephen Breyer; Samuel Alito · Sonia Sotomayor

Case opinions
- Majority: Scalia (parts I & II-A), joined by Roberts, Stevens, Thomas, Sotomayor
- Plurality: Scalia (parts II-B & II-D), joined by Roberts, Thomas, Sotomayor
- Concurrence: Scalia (part II-C), joined by Roberts, Thomas
- Concur/dissent: Stevens
- Dissent: Ginsburg, joined by Kennedy, Breyer, Alito

Shady Grove Orthopedic Associates, P.A. v. Allstate Ins. Co., 559 U.S. 393 (2010), was a United States Supreme Court case in which the court held that a Federal Rule of Civil Procedure must be applied by a federal district court situated in a state with competing rules if the Rule is "arguably procedural."

== Background ==
After Allstate refused to remit the interest due under New York law on Shady Grove's insurance claim, Shady Grove filed a class action in diversity to recover interest Allstate owed it and others. Despite the class action provisions set forth in Federal Rule of Civil Procedure 23, the District Court held itself deprived of jurisdiction by N. Y. Civ. Prac. Law Ann. §901(b), which precludes a class action to recover a "penalty" such as statutory interest. Affirming, the Second Circuit Court of Appeals acknowledged that a Federal Rule adopted in compliance with the Rules Enabling Act, 28 U. S. C. §2072, would control if it conflicted with the state rule but held there was no conflict because §901(b) and Rule 23 address different issues—eligibility of the particular type of claim for class treatment and certifiability of a given class, respectively. Finding no Federal Rule on point, the Court of Appeals held that §901(b) must be applied by federal courts sitting in diversity because it is "substantive" within the meaning of Erie Railroad Co. v. Tompkins.

== Opinion of the court ==
The Supreme Court issued its opinion on March 31, 2010.

== Subsequent developments ==
The bar instituted under Shady Grove is generally considered quite low, and as of November 2025 the Supreme Court has yet to strike down a rule under its test.

== See also ==
- Hanna v. Plumer
