= List of United States Supreme Court cases, volume 559 =

This is a list of all the United States Supreme Court cases from volume 559 of the United States Reports:

Case name	Citation	Date decided
Hemi Group, LLC v. City of New York	559 U.S. 1	2010
The Racketeer Influenced and Corrupt Organizations Act cannot be used by a city to collect damages against out-of-state internet vendors who fail to pay city cigarette taxes.
Briscoe v. Virginia	559 U.S. 32	2010
Vacated and remanded for further proceedings not inconsistent with Melendez-Diaz v. Massachusetts.
Wilkins v. Gaddy	559 U.S. 34	2010
Hudson v. McMillian requires courts to decide excessive force claims in the incarceration context based on the nature of the force rather than the extent of the injury.
Thaler v. Haynes	559 U.S. 43	2010
For purposes of an AEDPA challenge, no Supreme Court decision "clearly establishes" that a judge, in ruling on an objection to a peremptory challenge under Batson v. Kentucky, must reject a demeanor-based explanation for the challenge unless the judge personally observed and recalls the aspect of the prospective juror's demeanor on which the explanation is based.
Florida v. Powell	559 U.S. 50	2010
(1) In cases where federal law appears to control a state court's jurisdiction, the Supreme Court retains jurisdiction. (2) The warning given to the defendant in this case was adequate, as it reasonably conveyed to him his rights as required by Miranda v. Arizona.
Hertz Corp. v. Friend	559 U.S. 77	2010
For purposes of diversity jurisdiction, a corporation's principal place of business is its "nerve center".
Maryland v. Shatzer	559 U.S. 98	2010
Because the defendant experienced a break in Miranda custody lasting more than two weeks between the first and second attempts at interrogation, Edwards v. Arizona does not mandate suppression of his statements.
Kiyemba v. Obama	559 U.S. 131	2010
The court granted certiorari on the question of whether a federal court exercising habeas jurisdiction has the power to order the release of prisoners held at Guantanamo Bay where the Executive detention is indefinite and without authorization in law, and release into the continental United States is the only possible effective remedy. However, in the interim, the detainees and declined offers of resettlement elsewhere, so the Supreme Court vacated and remanded for reconsideration in light of that new fact.
Johnson v. United States	559 U.S. 133	2010
For the government to seek an enhanced sentence under the Armed Career Criminal Act for a criminal defendant who has previously been convicted of a violent felony, the previous conviction must be for a crime that required the state to prove the use of violent force as an element of the offense.
Reed Elsevier, Inc. v. Muchnick	559 U.S. 154	2010
A copyright holder must register under Section 411 (a) prior to filing a copyright infringement claim. Failure to comply does not restrict a Federal Court's subject jurisdiction over the matter.
Mac's Shell Service, Inc. v. Shell Oil Products Co.	559 U.S. 175	2010
A franchisee cannot recover for constructive termination under the PCMP if the franchisor’s allegedly wrongful conduct did not compel the franchisee to abandon its franchise.
Bloate v. United States	559 U.S. 196	2010
The time granted to prepare pretrial motions is not automatically excludable from the Speedy Trial Act's 70-day limit for bringing a case to trial. Such time may be excluded only when a district court grants a continuance based on appropriate findings under the act's subsection (h)(7).
Milavetz, Gallop & Milavetz, P.A. v. United States	559 U.S. 229	2010
Attorneys who provide bankruptcy assistance to assisted persons are debt relief agencies under the BAPCPA.
United Student Aid Funds, Inc. v. Espinosa	559 U.S. 260	2010
Although a Bankruptcy Court is not supposed to discharge a person's student loan debt without finding they meet an "undue hardship" requirement, the Bankruptcy Court may enter a binding order without doing so.
Graham Cnty. Soil & Water Conservation Dist. v. United States ex rel. Wilson	559 U.S. 280	2010
State "administrative" disclosures trigger the public disclosure bar within the False Claims Act.
Berghuis v. Smith	559 U.S. 314	2010
No opinion of the Supreme Court specifies the method or test courts must use to measure racial underrepresentation in a jury pool.
Jones v. Harris Associates L. P.	559 U.S. 335	2010
Jones v. Harris Associates
Padilla v. Kentucky	559 U.S. 356	2010
The lawyer for a noncitizen, charged with a crime, has a constitutional obligation to tell the client if a guilty plea carries a risk that he will be deported.
Shady Grove Orthopedic Associates, P.A. v. Allstate Ins. Co.	559 U.S. 393	2010
A Federal Rule of Civil Procedure must be applied by a federal district court situated in a state with competing rules if the Rule is "arguably procedural."
United States v. Stevens	559 U.S. 460	2010
Depictions of animal cruelty are not categorically unprotected by the First Amendment.
Conkright v. Frommert	559 U.S. 506	2010
The administrator of an ERISA plan is entitled to deference in matters of interpretation, even when the administrator had previously adopted a different interpretation that a court found erroneous.
Perdue v. Kenny A.	559 U.S. 542	2010
A federal court can award larger-than-usual attorney's fees for excellent performance in a civil rights case, but only in extraordinary circumstances.
Stolt-Nielsen S.A. v. AnimalFeeds Int'l Corp.	559 U.S. 662	2010
Class action arbitration is permitted under the Federal Arbitration Act only if all parties specifically agree to it.
Jerman v. Carlisle, McNellie, Rini, Kramer & Ulrich LPA	559 U.S. 573	2010
A debt collector's ignorance of the law does not qualify as a good-faith mistake for the Fair Debt Collection Practices Act's bona fide error defense.
Merck & Co. v. Reynolds	559 U.S. 633	2010
The time for a plaintiff to file a federal securities fraud lawsuit begins to run when the plaintiff discovers or reasonably should have discovered that the defendant knew that the defendant's statement was false.
Salazar v. Buono	559 U.S. 700	2010
Whether an individual has Article III standing to bring an Establishment Clause suit challenging the display of a religious symbol on government land and if an Act of Congress directing the land be transferred to a private entity is a permissible accommodation.
Renico v. Lett	559 U.S. 766	2010
The trial court's decision in this case was not unreasonable under AEDPA. A federal habeas court must be deferential to the state trial court, including its decision about whether a jury was deadlocked.
Hui v. Castaneda	559 U.S. 799	2010
The immunity provided by the Federal Tort Claims Act precludes Bivens actions against individual PHS officers or employees for harms arising out of constitutional violations committed while acting within the scope of their office or employment. The plaintiff can only sue the federal government, not the employees.
