= Lewis v. City of Chicago =

- Supreme Court of the United States

Decided May 24, 2010
- Full case name: Lewis v. City of Chicago
- Citations: 560 U.S. 205 (more)

Holding
- Employers can be sued any time they use results from employment-eligibility tests that rule out disproportionate numbers of marginalized groups.

Court membership
- Chief Justice John Roberts Associate Justices John P. Stevens · Antonin Scalia; Anthony Kennedy · Clarence Thomas; Ruth Bader Ginsburg · Stephen Breyer; Samuel Alito · Sonia Sotomayor

Case opinion
- Majority: Scalia, joined by unanimous

Lewis v. City of Chicago, 560 U.S. 205 (2010), was a United States Supreme Court case in which the court held that employers can be sued any time they use results from employment-eligibility tests that rule out disproportionate numbers of marginalized groups. The plaintiff does not need to challenge the rule at the time of its adoption.

== Background ==
In 1995, the City of Chicago gave a written examination to applicants seeking firefighter positions. In January 1996, the city announced it would draw candidates randomly from a list of applicants who scored at least 89 out of 100 points on the examination, whom it designated as "well qualified." It informed those who scored below 65 that they had failed and would not be considered further. It informed applicants who scored between 65 and 88, whom it designated as "qualified," that it was unlikely they would be called for further processing but that the city would keep them on the eligibility list for as long as that list was used.

That May, the City selected its first class of applicants to advance, and it repeated this process multiple times over the next six years. Beginning in March 1997, several African-American applicants who scored in the "qualified" range but had not been hired filed discrimination charges with the Equal Employment Opportunity Commission (EEOC) and received right-to-sue letters. They then filed suit, alleging that the city's practice of selecting only applicants who scored 89 or above had a disparate impact on African-Americans in violation of Title VII of the Civil Rights Act of 1964.

The federal District Court certified a class of African-Americans (including Lewis) who scored in the "qualified" range but were not hired. The court denied the city's summary judgment motion, rejecting its claim that petitioners had failed to file EEOC charges within 300 days "after the unlawful employment practice occurred," as mentioned in Title VII. Instead, the court found that the city's "ongoing reliance" on the 1995 test results constituted a continuing Title VII violation. The litigation then proceeded, and petitioners prevailed on the merits.

The Seventh Circuit Court of Appeals reversed the judgment in their favor, holding that the suit was untimely because the earliest EEOC charge was filed more than 300 days after the only discriminatory act—sorting the scores into the "well qualified," "qualified," and "not qualified" categories. The later hiring decisions, the Seventh Circuit held, were an automatic consequence of the test scores, not new discriminatory acts.

== Opinion of the court ==
The Supreme Court issued an opinion on May 24, 2010. The court held that the subsequent uses of the scores were separate discriminatory acts.
