= Alabama v. North Carolina =

- Supreme Court of the United States

Argued January 11, 2010 Decided June 1, 2010
- Full case name: State of Alabama, State of Florida, State of Tennessee, Commonwealth of Virginia, and Southeast Interstate Low-Level Radioactive Waste Management Commission, Plaintiffs v. State of North Carolina
- Citations: 560 U.S. 330 (more) 130 S. Ct. 2295; 176 L. Ed. 2d 1070
- Argument: Oral argument
- Decision: Opinion

Holding
- North Carolina was not prohibited from withdrawing from the Southeast Interstate Low-Level Radioactive Waste Management Compact, and the Southeast Compact Commission had no authority to levy monetary sanctions against North Carolina

Court membership
- Chief Justice John Roberts Associate Justices John P. Stevens · Antonin Scalia; Anthony Kennedy · Clarence Thomas; Ruth Bader Ginsburg · Stephen Breyer; Samuel Alito · Sonia Sotomayor

Case opinions
- Majority: Scalia, joined by Stevens, Ginsburg, Alito; Roberts (all but Parts II–D and III–B); Kennedy, Sotomayor (all but Part II–E); Thomas (all but Part III–B); Breyer (all but Parts II–C, II–D, and II–E)
- Concurrence: Kennedy (in part), joined by Sotomayor
- Concur/dissent: Roberts, joined by Thomas
- Concur/dissent: Breyer, joined by Roberts

Laws applied
- U. S. Const., Art. III, §2, cl. 2; 28 U. S. C. §1251(a); Southeast Interstate Low-Level Radioactive Waste Management Compact

Alabama v. North Carolina, 560 U.S. 330 (2010), was an original jurisdiction United States Supreme Court case. It arose from a disagreement between the state of North Carolina and the other members of the Southeast Interstate Low-Level Radioactive Waste Management Compact over the funding for a joint project. Eight states had formed the compact in 1983 to manage low-level radioactive waste in the southeastern United States. In 1986, North Carolina was chosen as the location for the regional waste facility, and it asked the other states for funding to help with the project. The project stalled and was eventually shut down, despite North Carolina receiving $80 million from the other states. After the project's demise, the other states demanded their money back, but North Carolina refused to repay them, leading to this case.

== Background ==
In 1980, Congress passed the Low Level Radioactive Waste Policy Act to authorize the creation of interstate agreements regarding the management of low-level radioactive waste. Accordingly, in 1983, North Carolina, along with the states of Alabama, Florida, Georgia, Mississippi, South Carolina, Tennessee, and Virginia, formed the Southeast Interstate Low-Level Radioactive Waste Management Compact to coordinate their management of low-level radioactive waste. It was run by a commission, which was tasked with choosing a State in which to construct a "regional disposal facility". In 1986, the commission chose North Carolina, thus requiring it to begin the process of seeking a licence for the construction of such a facility. Two years later, North Carolina asked the other states for monetary assistance with the project, which it received – by 1997, North Carolina had been paid more than $80 million. Yet, despite $34 million of North Carolina's own funds, it was unable to obtain the license in a timely fashion. In 1997, the commission told North Carolina that, without a plan for funding the rest of the licensing steps, it would be cut off; when it was, North Carolina began to shut down the project, claiming that it could not continue without additional funding.

In response, in June 1999, Florida and Tennessee asked that the commission levy monetary sanctions against North Carolina. North Carolina responded by attempting to leave the Compact entirely. It based this decision on a clause which declared that "any party state may withdraw from the compact by enacting a law repealing the compact, provided that if a regional facility is located within such state, such regional facility shall remain available to the region for four years after the date the commission receives verification in writing from the Governor of such party state of the rescission of the Compact".

The commission, in response to the complaint by Florida and Tennessee, demanded in December 1999 that, in addition to other monetary penalties, North Carolina repay approximately $80 million. The commission believed that, under article 7(F) of the original Compact, it had the power to level such monetary sanctions. However, North Carolina disagreed, and refused to comply with the commission's sanctions.

== Case history ==
In 2003, the Supreme Court allowed Alabama, Florida, Tennessee, and Virginia (the only four remaining members of the Compact), and the commission to sue North Carolina under the Court's original jurisdiction. The plaintiffs requested "monetary and other relief, including a declaration that North Carolina is subject to sanctions and that the commission's sanctions resolution is valid and enforceable." The case was assigned to a special master, who filed two reports.

In January 2010, the Supreme Court heard oral arguments regarding the exceptions to the reports that were filed by both parties.

== Decision ==
The Supreme Court overruled all of the states' objections to the Special Master's Reports. It held that the Compact did not give the commission the power to impose monetary sanctions against North Carolina; that the Court did not need to follow the commission's findings regarding North Carolina's supposed breach of its obligations; that North Carolina did not breach its obligations to take "appropriate steps" towards getting a license; and that North Carolina was allowed to withdraw from the Compact.

The Court remanded the remainder of the case back to the Special Master to further adjudicate the equitable claims raised by the petitioners.

== Subsequent history ==
In January 2011, the case was dismissed by agreement of the parties.
