= Hui v. Castaneda =

- Supreme Court of the United States

Decided May 3, 2010
- Full case name: Hui v. Castaneda
- Citations: 559 U.S. 799 (more)

Holding
- The immunity provided by the Federal Tort Claims Act precludes Bivens actions against individual PHS officers or employees for harms arising out of constitutional violations committed while acting within the scope of their office or employment. The plaintiff can only sue the federal government, not the employees.

Court membership
- Chief Justice John Roberts Associate Justices John P. Stevens · Antonin Scalia; Anthony Kennedy · Clarence Thomas; Ruth Bader Ginsburg · Stephen Breyer; Samuel Alito · Sonia Sotomayor

Case opinion
- Majority: Sotomayor, joined by unanimous

Hui v. Castaneda, 559 U.S. 799 (2010), was a United States Supreme Court case in which the court held that the immunity provided by the Federal Tort Claims Act precludes Bivens actions against individual PHS officers or employees for harms arising out of constitutional violations committed while acting within the scope of their office or employment. The plaintiff can only sue the federal government, not the employees.

== Background ==
While detained by immigration authorities, Francisco Castenada persistently sought treatment for a bleeding, suppurating lesion. Although a United States Public Health Service (PHS) physician's assistant and three outside specialists repeatedly advised that Castaneda urgently needed a biopsy, petitioners—a PHS physician and a commissioned PHS officer—denied the request. After Castaneda was released from custody, tests confirmed that he had metastatic cancer. He then filed this suit, raising medical negligence claims against the United States under the Federal Tort Claims Act (FTCA) and constitutional claims against petitioners under Bivens v. Six Unknown Fed. Narcotics Agents. When Castaneda died, his representative and his heir, were substituted as plaintiffs.

The federal District Court denied Hui's motion to dismiss the Bivens action, rejecting their claim of absolute immunity under 42 U.S.C. §233(a), which provides: "The [FTCA] remedy against the United States provided by [28 U.S.C. §§1346(b) and 2672] for damage for personal injury, including death, resulting from the performance of medical... or related functions... by any [PHS] commissioned officer or employee... while acting within the scope of his office or employment, shall be exclusive of any other civil action or proceeding by reason of the same subject-matter against the officer or employee." The Ninth Circuit Court of Appeals affirmed.

== Opinion of the court ==
The Supreme Court issued an opinion on May 3, 2010.
