= Stop the Beach Renourishment v. Florida Department of Environmental Protection =

- Supreme Court of the United States

Argued December 2, 2009 Decided June 17, 2010
- Full case name: Stop the Beach Renourishment, Inc. v. Florida Department of Environmental Protection
- Docket no.: 08-1151
- Citations: 560 U.S. 702 (more) 130 S. Ct. 2592; 177 L. Ed. 2d 184; 70 ERC 1505; 78 U.S.L.W. 4578; 10 Cal. Daily Op. Serv. 7553; 2010 Daily Journal D.A.R. 9081; 22 Fla. L. Weekly Fed. S 484

Case history
- Prior: 27 So. 3d 48 (Fla. App. 2006); review granted, 937 So. 2d 1099 (Fla. 2006), and review granted, 937 So. 2d 1100 (Fla. 2006); quashed, 998 So. 2d 1102 (Fla. 2008); cert. granted, 129 S. Ct. 2792 (2009)

Holding
- Florida Supreme Court did not effect an unconstitutional taking of littoral property owners' rights to future accretions and to contact the water by upholding Florida's beach renourishment program.

Court membership
- Chief Justice John Roberts Associate Justices John P. Stevens · Antonin Scalia; Anthony Kennedy · Clarence Thomas; Ruth Bader Ginsburg · Stephen Breyer; Samuel Alito · Sonia Sotomayor

Case opinions
- Majority: Scalia (Parts I, IV, and V), joined by Roberts, Kennedy, Thomas, Ginsburg, Breyer, Alito, Sotomayor
- Plurality: Scalia (Parts II and III), joined by Roberts, Thomas, Alito
- Concurrence: Kennedy (in part), joined by Sotomayor
- Concurrence: Breyer (in part), joined by Ginsburg
- Stevens took no part in the consideration or decision of the case.

Laws applied
- U.S. Const. amend. V

Stop the Beach Renourishment v. Florida Department of Environmental Protection, 560 U.S. 702 (2010), was a United States Supreme Court case in which the Court held that the Florida Supreme Court did not effect an unconstitutional taking of littoral property owners' rights to future accretions and to contact the water by upholding Florida's beach renourishment program.

At issue was whether the Florida Supreme Court violated the United States Constitution's Takings Clause when it upheld a plan to create a state-owned public beach between private waterfront property and the Gulf of Mexico through its beach nourishment program.

== Background ==
In 2003, the City of Destin and Walton County applied to add about 75 ft of dry sand to 6.9 mi of local eroded beach. Beachfront property owners objected to the project and incorporated plaintiff Stop the Beach Renourishment, Inc. to stop the beach nourishment. The plaintiff lost its administrative challenge to the Florida Department of Environmental Protection.

On appeal, the plaintiff won, and the Florida First District Court of Appeal found ownership of beachfront property as including a perpetual right for the property to touch the water. The District Court of Appeal also certified a question to the Florida Supreme Court to ask if Florida's beach restoration statute was even constitutional.

The Florida Supreme Court answered that the statute was constitutional and additionally quashed the District Court of Appeal's order by finding there is no perpetual right for beachfront property to touch the water.

The plaintiff then petitioned the United States Supreme Court, arguing that the Florida Supreme Court's rejection of its theorized property right was itself a taking without just compensation, contrary to the Fifth and Fourteenth Amendments.

== Decision ==
The US Supreme Court unanimously affirmed by holding that the Florida Supreme Court had accurately interpreted Florida property law. In an intensive review of Florida case law, the Supreme Court held that the Florida doctrine of avulsion, which holds that land created by a sudden event belongs to the owner of the seabed, applies to beach restoration. Because the state owns the seabed, there could be no taking. Indeed, the Florida Supreme Court complained that the District Court of Appeal, and the parties had never discussed the doctrine of avulsion in their briefings or rulings below. Accordingly, the US Supreme Court ruled that the burden is on the property owner to show that a property right existed prior to a judicial decision that abolishes the right.

Three Justices joined the portions of Justice Scalia’s opinion that held a Takings Clause analysis should be identical to analyze actions taken by all branches of government. Consequently, Scalia wrote that judicial takings are no different. He also attacked the concurring opinions of other justices by accusing Justice Breyer of a "Queen-of-Hearts approach" and Justice Kennedy of being "Orwellian." After questioning the logic and the deprecation of modern views on the Lochner era, Scalia concluded by observing that substantive due process "never means never – because it never means anything precise."

== Concurrences ==
Justice Kennedy, joined by Justice Sotomayor, cautioned against finding a judicial takings by noting that it is a novel concept and that it is institutionally unwise to reach questions that have not been well discussed by lower courts or commentators. Regardless, Kennedy theorizes that procedural and substantive due process should protect from judicial elimination of property rights, even without invoking the Takings Clause.

Justice Breyer, joined by Justice Ginsburg, also take issue with the plurality's judicial takings logic by noting the longstanding habit of the court to avoid deciding a question of constitutional law unless it is necessary. Breyer rejects Scalia's criticism noting that he does not need to announce a standard to find the claim would fail under any standard.

Justice Stevens, who left the court twelve days after the case was decided, did not participate because he owned a beachfront property in Florida.
