= Merck & Co. v. Reynolds =

- Supreme Court of the United States

Decided April 27, 2010
- Full case name: Merck & Co. v. Reynolds
- Citations: 559 U.S. 633 (more)

Holding
- The time for a plaintiff to file a federal securities fraud lawsuit begins to run when the plaintiff discovers or reasonably should have discovered that the defendant knew that the defendant's statement was false.

Court membership
- Chief Justice John Roberts Associate Justices John P. Stevens · Antonin Scalia; Anthony Kennedy · Clarence Thomas; Ruth Bader Ginsburg · Stephen Breyer; Samuel Alito · Sonia Sotomayor

Case opinions
- Majority: Breyer, joined by Roberts, Kennedy, Ginsburg, Alito, Sotomayor
- Concurrence: Stevens (in part)
- Concurrence: Scalia (in part), joined by Thomas

Laws applied
- Securities Exchange Act of 1934

Merck & Co. v. Reynolds, 559 U.S. 633 (2010), was a United States Supreme Court case in which the court held that the time for a plaintiff to file a federal securities fraud lawsuit begins to run when the plaintiff discovers or reasonably should have discovered that the defendant knew that the defendant's statement was false.

== Background ==
On November 6, 2003, a number of investors including Reynolds filed a securities fraud action under §10(b) of the Securities Exchange Act of 1934, alleging that Merck & Co. knowingly misrepresented the heart-attack risks associated with its drug Vioxx. A securities fraud complaint is timely if filed no more than "2 years after the discovery of the facts constituting the violation" or 5 years after the violation. The federal District Court dismissed the complaint as untimely because the plaintiffs should have been alerted to the possibility of Merck's misrepresentations prior to November 2001, more than 2 years before the complaint was filed, and they had failed to undertake a reasonably diligent investigation at that time. Among the relevant circumstances were (1) a March 2000 "VIGOR" study comparing Vioxx with the painkiller naproxen and showing adverse cardiovascular results for Vioxx, which Merck suggested might be due to the absence of a benefit conferred by naproxen rather than a harm caused by Vioxx (the naproxen hypothesis); (2) an FDA warning letter, released to the public on September 21, 2001, saying that Merck's Vioxx marketing with regard to the cardiovascular results was "false, lacking in fair balance, or otherwise misleading"; and (3) pleadings filed in products-liability actions in September and October 2001 alleging that Merck had concealed information about Vioxx and intentionally downplayed its risks. The Third Circuit reversed, holding that the pre-November 2001 events did not suggest that Merck acted with scienter, an element of a §10(b) violation, and consequently did not commence the running of the limitations period.

== Opinion of the court ==
The Supreme Court issued an opinion on April 27, 2010.
