= Maryland v. Shatzer =

- Supreme Court of the United States

Argued October 5, 2009 Decided February 24, 2010
- Full case name: Maryland, Petitioner v. Michael Blaine Shatzer, Sr.
- Docket no.: 08-680
- Citations: 559 U.S. 98 (more) 130 S. Ct. 1213; 175 L. Ed. 2d 1045; 2010 U.S. LEXIS 1899
- Argument: Oral argument
- Opinion announcement: Opinion announcement

Case history
- Prior: Defendant convicted, No. 21–K–06–37799 (Cir. Ct. Washington Cty., Md., September 21, 2006); Court of Appeals of Maryland reversed and remanded, 405 Md., at 606–607, 954 A. 2d, at 1131; cert. granted, 555 U. S. ___ (2009). 405 Md. 585, 954 A. 2d 1118

Questions presented
- Is the Edwards v. Arizona prohibition against interrogation of a suspect who has invoked the Fifth Amendment right to counsel inapplicable if, after the suspect asks for counsel, there is a break in custody or a substantial lapse in time (more than two years and six months) before commencing reinterrogation pursuant to Miranda?

Holding
- Because Shatzer experienced a break in Miranda custody lasting more than two weeks between the first and second attempts at interrogation, Edwards does not mandate suppression of his statements.

Court membership
- Chief Justice John Roberts Associate Justices John P. Stevens · Antonin Scalia; Anthony Kennedy · Clarence Thomas; Ruth Bader Ginsburg · Stephen Breyer; Samuel Alito · Sonia Sotomayor

Case opinions
- Majority: Scalia, joined by Roberts, Kennedy, Ginsburg, Breyer, Alito, Sotomayor; Thomas (Part III)
- Concurrence: Thomas (in part and in judgment)
- Concurrence: Stevens (in judgment)

Maryland v. Shatzer, 559 U.S. 98 (2010), was a United States Supreme Court case in which the Court held that police may re-open questioning of a suspect who has asked for counsel (thereby under Edwards v. Arizona ending questioning) if there has been a 14-day or more break in Miranda custody. The ruling distinguished Edwards, which had not specified a limit.

== Background ==
In Miranda v. Arizona (1966), the Supreme Court held that statements of criminal suspects made while they are in custody and subject to interrogation by any government authority may not be admitted in court unless the suspect first had certain warnings read to him beforehand. In Edwards v. Arizona, the Supreme Court further clarified that once a suspect had invoked their right to have an attorney police questioning must cease. Left unanswered was how long this protection applied—when could police resume questioning?

Michael Shatzer, the respondent in the case, was an inmate in the Maryland penal system, serving time for child sexual abuse. In 2003 police desired to question Shatzer about allegations that he had sexually abused his son. Shatzer declined to speak without his attorney present, at which point the interview ended (per Edwards). The police closed the investigation and Shatzer returned to the prison population. Three years later the police opened a new investigation and again asked to question Shatzer. This time Shatzer waived his right to have an attorney present; only after making incriminating statements did Shatzer ask for an attorney. With this evidence in hand, Shatzer was convicted of sexual child abuse by the Washington County, Maryland circuit court. The court denied Shatzer's motion to suppress his confession, reasoning that the three years between the two interviews counted as a break in custody.

On appeal, the Court of Appeals of Maryland reversed, holding that even if there were a break in custody exception to Edwards, being released back into the prison population would not constitute such. The state of Maryland petitioned the Supreme Court for a writ of certiorari, which was granted on January 26, 2009.

== Opinion ==
Justice Scalia delivered the opinion of the court, joined by Chief Justice Roberts and Justices Kennedy, Ginsburg, Breyer, Alito and Sotomayor. Justice Thomas joined as to part III only and filed an opinion concurring in part and concurring in judgment. Justice Stevens also filed an opinion concurring in judgment.

The court divided its opinion into four parts:

Part I reviewed the prior history of the case before the court.

Part II, the court explained that the Edwards rule, (which required police to cease questioning once a suspect had asked for an attorney) while not a constitutional guarantee itself, served as a "prophylactic" for a suspect's Fifth Amendment rights. The court noted that while it had never spoken on the question of a break in custody, lower courts had affirmed that there was such an exception, and as the court had promulgated the rule in the first place it was obliged to clarify the issue. The purpose of Edwards was to protect a suspect who found himself in unusual circumstances; extending the Edwards rule indefinitely would not meet this aim and have the effect of protecting repeat offenders who "acquired Edwards immunity previously in connection with any offense in any jurisdiction." Having declined to extend Edwards indefinitely, the court adopted a standard of 14 days. The court justified this period by noting that 14 days "provides plenty of time for the suspect to get reacclimated to his normal life, to consult with friends and counsel, and to shake off any residual coercive effects of his prior custody."

In Part III, the court considered the specific facts of the case: under the newly qualified standards, did the three years between the two interviews, during which Shatzer was incarcerated, constitute a "break in custody"? The court held that it did: while in the general prison population, Shatzer was free from the coercive power of an interrogator.

In Part IV, the court responded to claims made by Justice Stevens in his concurrence that the majority opinion underestimated the coercive effect of a police interrogator re-opening a line of questioning after a break in custody.
