= Abbott v. Abbott =

- Supreme Court of the United States

Argued January 12, 2010 Decided May 17, 2010
- Full case name: Timothy Mark Cameron Abbott, Petitioner v. Jacquelyn Vaye Abbott
- Docket no.: 08-645
- Citations: 560 U.S. 1 (more) 130 S. Ct. 1983; 176 L. Ed. 2d 789
- Argument: Oral argument

Case history
- Prior: 495 F. Supp. 2d 635 (W.D. Tex. 2007); affirmed, 542 F.3d 1081 (5th Cir. 2008); cert. granted, 557 U.S. 933 (2009).
- Procedural: Writ of certiorari to the Fifth Circuit Court of Appeals.

Holding
- A parent's ne exeat right is a right to custody under Hague Convention on the Civil Aspects of International Child Abduction and the International Child Abduction Remedies Act.

Court membership
- Chief Justice John Roberts Associate Justices John P. Stevens · Antonin Scalia; Anthony Kennedy · Clarence Thomas; Ruth Bader Ginsburg · Stephen Breyer; Samuel Alito · Sonia Sotomayor

Case opinions
- Majority: Kennedy, joined by Roberts, Scalia, Ginsburg, Alito, Sotomayor
- Dissent: Stevens, joined by Thomas, Breyer

Laws applied
- 42 U.S.C. § 11601 et seq.

Abbott v. Abbott, 560 U.S. 1 (2010), was a decision by the Supreme Court of the United States holding that a parent's ne exeat right (in this case: the right to prevent a child to leave the country) is a "right to custody" under the Hague Convention on the Civil Aspects of International Child Abduction and the US International Child Abduction Remedies Act. The child thus should have been returned to Chile, the country of "habitual residence" because the mother violated the ne exeat right of the father when taking the child to the United States without the father's consent.

== Background ==
=== History ===
In 1995, "A.J.A." was born in Hawaii to parents Timothy Abbott, a British citizen, and Jacquelyn Abbott, a U.S. citizen. The family subsequently moved to Chile for Mr. Abbott's work with a U.S. Observatory, where the parents separated. Mrs. Abbott was awarded full care and custody of A.J.A, and Mr. Abbott was granted weekend visitation and partial summer possession of the child. The Chilean family court entered a decree with a ne exeat order prohibiting either parent from removing the child from Chile at the request of Mrs. Abbott.

In July 2005, Mr. Abbott sought to modify the court's visitation order and expand his visitation rights. Mrs. Abbott removed A.J.A. to Texas without Mr. Abbott's prior consent. Mrs. Abbott did not request permission from the Chilean court to take the child out of Chile or to override Mr. Abbott's ne exeat right.

Mr. Abbott brought suit in the US Federal District Court seeking an order compelling A.J.A's return to Chile under the Hague Convention on the Civil Aspects of International Child Abduction. The district court denied Mr. Abbott's requested order and held that the child's removal did not violate the father's rights of custody, as defined by the Hague Convention. Mr. Abbott appealed the district court ruling to the U.S. Fifth Circuit Court of Appeals, which affirmed the lower court's ruling.

=== Amicus curiae ===
In support of Mr. Abbott's position, amicus curiae briefs were filed by the Permanent Bureau of the Hague Conference on Private International Laws, United States of America, the State of California, the National Center for Missing and Exploited Children, S&W International ChildFind Program, the Massachusetts Society for the Prevention of Cruelty to Children, Justice for Children, Pathways for Children, Children's Law Center of Los Angeles, and Emerge.

In support of Ms. Abbott's position, amicus curiae briefs were filed by Delegates Lawrence H. Stotter and Matti Savolainen on the Drafting and Negotiating of the Hague Convention on the Civil Aspects of International Child Abduction, the University of Cincinnati College of Law Domestic Violence and Civil Protection Order Clinic, eleven law professors, the Domestic Legal Violence Legal Empowerment and Appeals Project, the Battered Women's Justice Project- Domestic Abuse Interviention Programs, Inc., the National Coalition Against Domestic Violence, Legal Momentum, and the National Network to End Domestic Violence.

In support of neither party, an amicus curiae brief was filed by Reunite International Child Abduction Center.

== Opinion of the Court ==
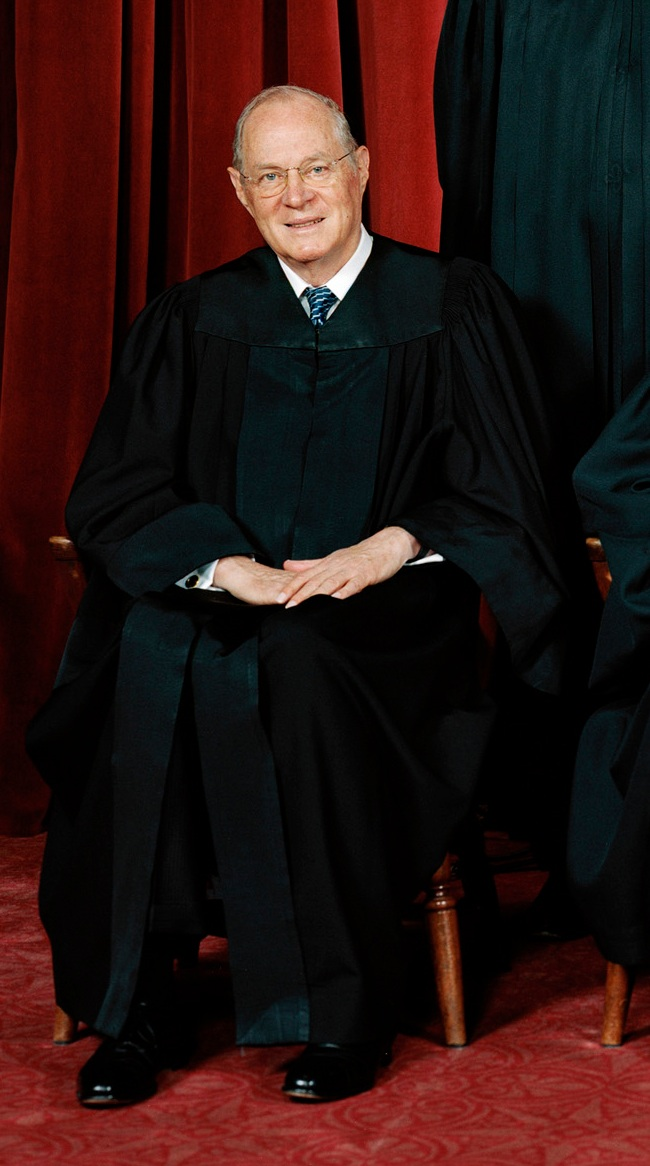
Justice Kennedy delivered the opinion of the Court.

On May 17, 2010, Justice Kennedy, joined by Chief Justice Roberts and Justices Scalia, Ginsburg, Alito and Sotomayor, delivered the opinion of the Court in holding that a parent's ne exeat right is a "right to custody" under the Hague Convention on the Civil Aspects of International Child Abduction and the International Child Remedies Act. In so finding, the Supreme Court overruled the Fifth Circuit Court of Appeals and remanded the case for further proceedings in conformity with the Supreme Court ruling.

The threshold question considered by the Court was whether the child at issue, A.J.A., was "wrongfully removed" from Chile in violation of a parent's "right of custody" so as to trigger the applicable compulsory return provisions of the Hague Convention on the Civil Aspects of International Child Abduction. In determining whether the child was "wrongfully removed," the Court considered the plain language of the Hague Convention, the position of the U.S. Department of State, Chilean law, rulings of several foreign jurisdictions that had considered the issue, and the purpose of the Hague Convention. The Court found broad acceptance for the view that a ne exeat right, or a right to prevent a child's removal from his country of residence, is "decisionmaking authority regarding a child's relocation", which is specifically mentioned as classifying for (joint) "right of custody" under the definition of the convention.

Accordingly, when A.J.A. was removed from Chile in violation of Mr. Abbott's ne exeat right, the child was "wrongfully removed" within the meaning of the Hague Convention. Under such circumstances, the Convention compels A.J.A.'s return to Chile unless Mrs. Abbott can establish an exception under the Hague Convention based on the child's need for emergency protection. To determine whether such emergency circumstances exist, the Supreme Court remanded the case for further proceedings consistent with its ruling.

=== Stevens' dissent ===
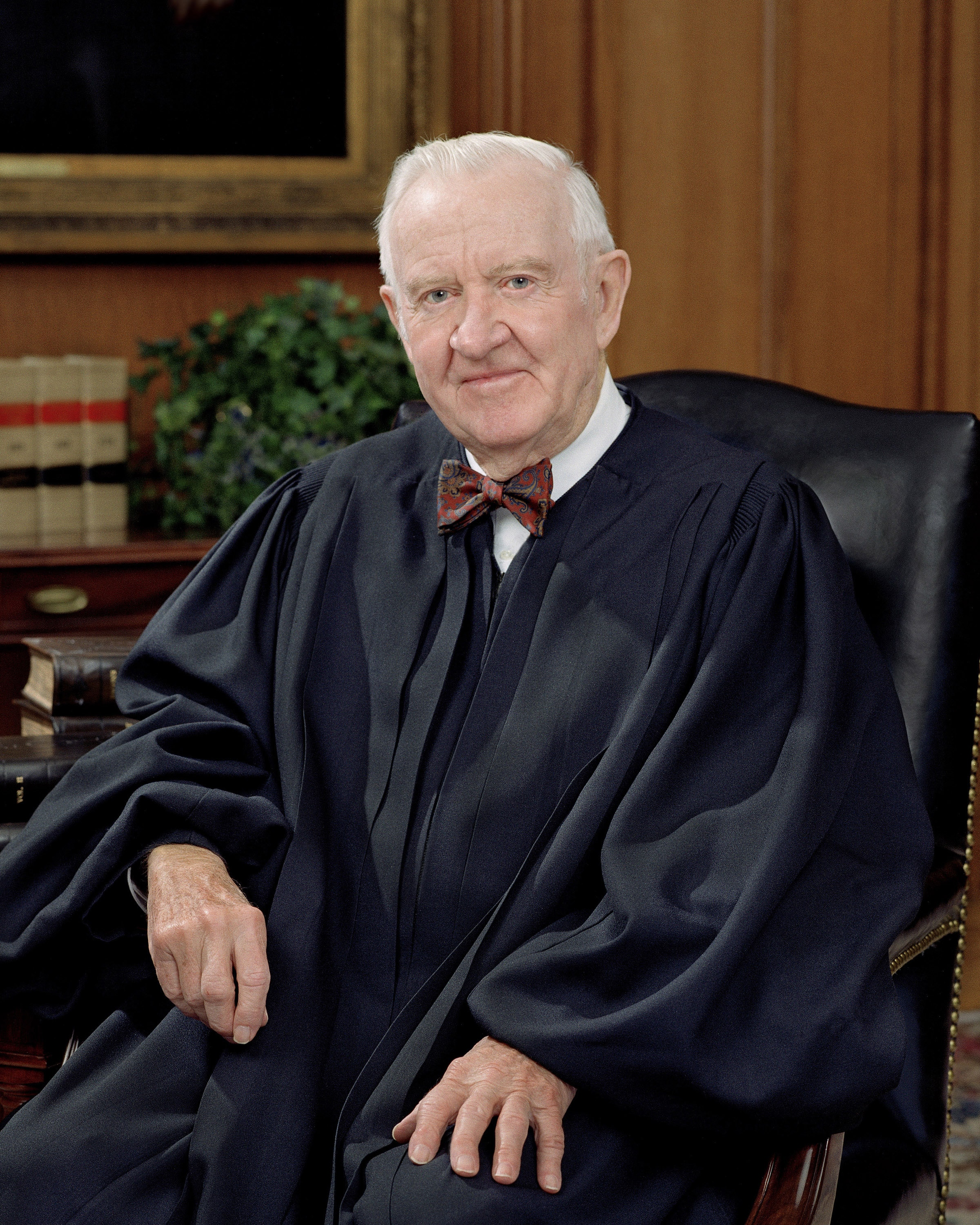
Justice Stevens delivered the dissenting opinion.

Justice Stevens, joined by Justice Thomas and Justice Breyer, delivered the dissenting opinion. The dissent concluded that reliance on the Hague Convention to compel A.J.A.'s return to Chile was improper; in a situation like the Abbotts', the Hague Convention provides recourse for the non-custodial parent to exercise his "rights of access" internationally, but the Convention does not provide a non-custodial parent the right to compel the child's return to its habitual country of residence.

The dissenting opinion noted that Mr. Abbott's rights are limited to visitation and the right to restrict the child's travel outside of Chile. The dissent also emphasized the fact that Mrs. Abbott has the exclusive right to make decisions about the child's education, medical care and day-to-day life. Contrary to the majority view, the dissent concluded that Mr. Abbott's limited parental rights fall well short of the Hague Convention's requirements for compulsory return of a child. Mr. Abbott had neither a right to determine the child's residence nor a right to make decisions about the child's care; Mr. Abbott's limited rights do not elevate his status to that of a custodial parent. According to the dissent, Mr. Abbott is not a custodial parent and cannot satisfy the requirements set forth in the Hague Convention for compulsory return of a child to his home country.

== Subsequent developments ==
The Abbott case was ultimately dismissed because the child turned 16 and was no longer subject to the compulsory return provisions of the Hague Convention.

== See also ==
- List of United States Supreme Court cases, volume 560
