= New Process Steel, L.P. v. NLRB =

- Supreme Court of the United States

Argued March 23, 2010 Decided June 17, 2010
- Full case name: New Process Steel v. National Labor Relations Board
- Docket no.: 08-1457
- Citations: 560 U.S. 674 (more) 130 S. Ct. 2635; 177 L. Ed. 2d 162

Case history
- Prior: 564 F.3d 840 (7th Cir. 2009); cert. granted, 558 U.S. 989 (2009).

Holding
- A statute requiring the National Labor Relations Board to decide cases with a three-member quorum does not allow two of them to work despite a vacancy on the ground that they constitute a majority of the quorum.

Court membership
- Chief Justice John Roberts Associate Justices John P. Stevens · Antonin Scalia; Anthony Kennedy · Clarence Thomas; Ruth Bader Ginsburg · Stephen Breyer; Samuel Alito · Sonia Sotomayor

Case opinions
- Majority: Stevens, joined by Roberts, Scalia, Thomas, Alito
- Dissent: Kennedy, joined by Ginsburg, Breyer, Sotomayor

Laws applied
- Taft–Hartley Act, National Labor Relations Act

New Process Steel, L.P. v. NLRB, 560 U.S. 674 (2010), is a U.S. labor law case of the United States Supreme Court holding that the National Labor Relations Board (NLRB) cannot make decisions without at least three members on a panel.

== Background: the NLRA's quorum requirement ==
When the National Labor Relations Act (also known as the Wagner Act) was passed in 1935, the NLRB had three members, with two members "at all times" constituting a quorum. In 1947, Congress passed the Taft-Hartley Act, which increased the size of the Board from three to five members, with the powers of the Board delegated to three-member panels who issued decisions in cases.

According to Section 3(b) of the Act, as amended by Taft-Hartley,

The Board is authorized to delegate to any group of three or more members any or all of the powers which it may itself exercise. A vacancy in the Board shall not impair the right of the remaining members to exercise all of the powers of the Board, and three members of the Board shall, at all times, constitute a quorum of the Board, except that two members shall constitute a quorum of any group designated pursuant to the first sentence hereof.

Between 1993 and 2007, there were brief periods when the Board had only two members, but these have rarely extended beyond a few days and the two-member Board did not issue decisions.

== The two-member Board ==
In December 2007, the terms for three of the Board's five members were set to expire. President George W. Bush's nominees were blocked by Senate Democrats. On December 16, 2007, Chairman Robert J. Battista's term expired and member Wilma Liebman took over as chairwoman for the remaining four-person Board. On December 28, 2007, with the terms of members Peter Kirsanow and Dennis Walsh set to expire on New Year's Eve, the four-member Board delegated all of its powers to the three-person panel of Chairwoman Liebman and members Kirsanow and Peter Schaumber. By doing so, the Board operated under the assumption that the two remaining members, Liebman and Schaumber, were able to make decisions as a majority of the designated three-person Board.

That same day, the General Counsel issued an unfair labor practice complaint against employer New Process Steel in their dispute with the International Association of Machinists and Aerospace Workers. On May 1, 2008, an administrative law judge issued a decision against New Process Steel. The General Counsel followed with another complaint on May 29, 2008, and filed for summary judgment with the Board. In late September 2008, the Board found New Process Steel to have violated Sections 8(a)(1) and (5) of the NLRA in both cases.

New Process Steel appealed the Board's decisions, arguing in part that the Board lacked the required three-person quorum to make decisions. The Seventh Circuit Court of Appeals denied the appeal and enforced the Board's order on May 1, 2009. New Process Steel then appealed to the Supreme Court, which granted certiorari on November 2, 2009, due to conflicting circuit court decisions and a request from the Department of Justice to review the issue given the stakes. The First, Second, Fourth, Seventh and Tenth Circuit Courts of Appeals had ruled in favor of the government; however, the United States Court of Appeals for the D.C. Circuit ruled against it.

Between January 2008 and June 2010, according to then-Solicitor General Elena Kagan, the two-member Board of Liebman and Schaumber issued nearly 600 decisions.New Process Steel, L.P. v. NLRB, 560 U.S. 674, 678 (2010). During that time, they informally agreed to hear only noncontroversial cases until a third member was confirmed.

== Judgment ==
The question before the Court was; Does the NLRB have legally recognized authority to decide cases with only two sitting members, where 29 U.S.C. § 153(b) provides that "three members of the Board shall, at all times, constitute a quorum of the Board"?

The Court ruled for the plaintiffs. The NLRB lacked the authority to issue official rulings with only two members, regardless if a majority of the Board had delegated its power to a smaller group. The Court determined that as the statute was written Congress only allowed the NLRB to delegate power to three of the five members. If Congress had wanted to allow two members the full powers of the Board, then it would have written it into the statute. It rejected the government's argument for the sake of efficiency.
