= Mac's Shell Service, Inc. v. Shell Oil Products Co. =

- Supreme Court of the United States

Decided March 2, 2010
- Full case name: Mac's Shell Service, Inc. v. Shell Oil Products Co.
- Citations: 559 U.S. 175 (more)

Holding
- A franchisee cannot recover for constructive termination under the PCMP if the franchisor’s allegedly wrongful conduct did not compel the franchisee to abandon its franchise.

Court membership
- Chief Justice John Roberts Associate Justices John P. Stevens · Antonin Scalia; Anthony Kennedy · Clarence Thomas; Ruth Bader Ginsburg · Stephen Breyer; Samuel Alito · Sonia Sotomayor

Case opinion
- Majority: Alito, joined by unanimous

Laws applied
- Petroleum Marketing Practices Act

Mac's Shell Service, Inc. v. Shell Oil Products Co., 559 U.S. 175 (2010), was a United States Supreme Court case in which the court held that a franchisee cannot recover for constructive termination under the Petroleum Marketing Practices Act (PMPA) if the franchisor’s allegedly wrongful conduct did not compel the franchisee to abandon its franchise. Additionally, the court held that a franchisee who signs and operates under a renewal agreement with a franchisor may not maintain a constructive nonrenewal claim under the PMPA.

== Background ==
The Petroleum Marketing Practices Act (PMPA) limits the circumstances in which franchisors may "terminate" a gas-station franchise or "fail to renew" a franchise relationship. Typically, the franchisor leases the service station to the franchisee and permits the franchisee to use the franchisor's trademark and purchase the franchisor's fuel for resale.

In this case, gas-station franchisees (dealers, including Mac's Shell Service) filed suit under the PMPA, alleging that a petroleum franchisor and its assignee had constructively "terminate[d]" their franchises and constructively "fail[ed] to renew" their franchise relationships by substantially changing the rental terms that the dealers had enjoyed for years, increasing costs for many of them. The dealers asserted these claims even though they had not been compelled to abandon their franchises. Additionally, they had been offered and had accepted renewal agreements. The jury found against the franchisor and assignee, and the federal District Court denied their requests for judgment as a matter of law.

The First Circuit Court of Appeals affirmed as to the constructive termination claims, holding that the PMPA does not require a franchisee to abandon its franchise to recover for such termination, and concluding that a simple breach of contract by an assignee of a franchise agreement can amount to constructive termination if the breach resulted in a material change effectively ending the lease. However, the court reversed as to the constructive nonrenewal claims, holding that such a claim cannot be maintained once a franchisee signs and operates under a renewal agreement.

== Opinion of the court ==
The Supreme Court issued an opinion on March 2, 2010.
