= United Student Aid Funds, Inc. v. Espinosa =

- Supreme Court of the United States

Decided March 23, 2010
- Full case name: United Student Aid Funds, Inc. v. Espinosa
- Citations: 559 U.S. 260 (more)

Holding
- Although a Bankruptcy Court is not supposed to discharge a person's student loan debt without finding they meet an "undue hardship" requirement, the Bankruptcy Court may enter a binding order without doing so.

Court membership
- Chief Justice John Roberts Associate Justices John P. Stevens · Antonin Scalia; Anthony Kennedy · Clarence Thomas; Ruth Bader Ginsburg · Stephen Breyer; Samuel Alito · Sonia Sotomayor

Case opinion
- Majority: Thomas, joined by unanimous

Laws applied
- Fed. R. Civ. P. 60(b)(4)

United Student Aid Funds, Inc. v. Espinosa, 559 U.S. 260 (2010), was a United States Supreme Court case in which the court held that, although a Bankruptcy Court is not supposed to discharge a person's student loan debt without finding whether they meet the "undue hardship" requirement, the Bankruptcy Court may enter a binding order without doing so.

== Background ==
In 1992, Francisco Espinosa filed for a Chapter 13 bankruptcy, with a plan proposing repayment of the principal on four federally guaranteed student loans, while discharging the accrued interest. A plan proposed under Bankruptcy Code (Code) Chapter 13 becomes effective upon confirmation, and results in a discharge of the debts listed in the plan if the debtor completes the planned payments. A debtor may obtain a discharge of government-sponsored student loan debts only if failure to discharge that debt would impose an "undue hardship" on the debtor and his dependents. Bankruptcy courts must make this undue hardship determination in an adversary proceeding, which the party seeking the determination must initiate by serving a summons and complaint on his adversary.

Espinosa's plan proposed repaying the principal on his student loan debt and discharging the interest once the principal was repaid, but he did not initiate the required adversary proceeding. The student loan creditor, United Student Aid Funds, received notice of the plan from the Bankruptcy Court and did not object to the plan or to Espinosa's failure to initiate the required proceeding. The Bankruptcy Court confirmed the plan without holding such a proceeding or making a finding of undue hardship. Once Espinosa paid his student loan principal, the court discharged the interest.

A few years later, the United States Department of Education sought to collect that interest. In response, Espinosa asked the court to enforce the confirmation order by directing the Department and United to cease any collection efforts. United opposed the motion and filed a cross-motion under Federal Rule of Civil Procedure 60(b)(4), seeking to set aside as void the confirmation order because the plan provision authorizing discharge of Espinosa's student loan interest was inconsistent with the Code and the Bankruptcy Rules, and because United's due process rights were violated when Espinosa failed to serve it with the required summons and complaint. Rejecting those arguments, the Bankruptcy Court granted Espinosa's motion in relevant part and denied the cross-motion.

On appeal, the federal District Court reversed, holding that United was denied due process when the confirmation order was issued without the required service. The Ninth Circuit Court of Appeals reversed the District Court. It concluded that, by confirming Espinosa's plan without first finding undue hardship in an adversary proceeding, the Bankruptcy Court at most committed a legal error that United might have successfully appealed, but that such error was no basis for setting aside the order as void under Rule 60(b)(4). It also held that Espinosa's failure to serve United was not a basis upon which to declare the judgment void because United received actual notice of the plan and failed to object.

== Opinion of the court ==
The Supreme Court issued a unanimous opinion on 23 March 2010, affirming the confirmation order passed by the Ninth Circuit. The opinion was delivered by Justice Thomas. It held that even though the order was erroneous, it was not void under Federal Rule of Civil Procedure 60(b)(4). United argued that its due process rights were violated as no summons or complaints was submitted to them by Espinosa. The Court rejected the argument, holding that the confirmation of the plan by United satisfied their due process rights. The argument related to the order being void was also rejected, holding that the failure to make the finding of undue hardship was an error of law, but it was not void merely because of it. United could have raised the issue by filing a timely appeal, which wasn't pursued.

== Later developments ==
The Espinosa judgment is a leading authority on the narrow scope of Federal Rule of Civil Procedure 60(b)(4). A confirmed order binds a creditor that receives notice, but fails to object. A legal error is not a due-process defect and cannot be a sole basis for an order to be void.
