= Johnson v. United States (2010) =

- Supreme Court of the United States

Decided March 2, 2010
- Full case name: Johnson v. United States
- Citations: 559 U.S. 133 (more)

Holding
- For the government to seek an enhanced sentence under the Armed Career Criminal Act for a criminal defendant who has previously been convicted of a violent felony, the previous conviction must be for a crime that required the state to prove the use of violent force as an element of the offense.

Court membership
- Chief Justice John Roberts Associate Justices John P. Stevens · Antonin Scalia; Anthony Kennedy · Clarence Thomas; Ruth Bader Ginsburg · Stephen Breyer; Samuel Alito · Sonia Sotomayor

Johnson v. United States, 559 U.S. 133 (2010), was a United States Supreme Court case in which the court held that, for the government to seek an enhanced sentence under the Armed Career Criminal Act for a criminal defendant who has previously been convicted of a violent felony, the previous conviction must be for a crime that required the state to prove the use of violent force as an element of the offense. In this case, the previous conviction was for battery in a jurisdiction where the state needed to prove that a defendant "[a]ctually and intentionally touch[ed]" another person. The court held that this did not satisfy the ACCA's "violent felony" standard because this did not require the state to prove that the defendant used any violent force.

== Background ==
Johnson pleaded guilty to possession of ammunition by a convicted felon. The government sought a sentencing enhancement under the Armed Career Criminal Act, which authorizes an enhanced penalty for a person who violates §922(g) and who "has three previous convictions" for "a violent felony," defined as, among other things, an offense that "has as an element the use... of physical force against the person of another". Among the three prior felony convictions the government proffered was Johnson's 2003 Florida conviction for simple battery, which ordinarily is a first-degree misdemeanor, Fla. Stat. §784.03(1)(b), but was a felony conviction for Johnson because he had previously been convicted of another battery, Fla. Stat. §784.03(2). Under Florida law, a battery occurs when a person either "[a]ctually and intentionally touches or strikes another person against [his] will," or "[i]ntentionally causes bodily harm to another person." §784.03(1)(a). Nothing in the record permitted the federal District Court to conclude that Johnson's 2003 conviction rested upon the "strik[ing]" or "[i]ntentionally caus[ing] bodily harm" elements of the offense. Accordingly, his conviction was a predicate conviction for a "violent felony" under the Armed Career Criminal Act only if "[a]ctually and intentionally touch[ing]" another constitutes the use of "physical force" under the ACCA. Concluding it did, the District Court enhanced Johnson's sentence, sentencing him to a term of 15 years and 5 months. The Eleventh Circuit Court of Appeals affirmed.

== Opinion of the court ==
The Supreme Court issued an opinion on March 2, 2010.
