= United States v. O'Brien (2010) =

- Supreme Court of the United States

Decided May 24, 2010
- Full case name: United States v. O'Brien
- Citations: 560 U.S. 218 (more)

Holding
- When used by the prosecution to obtain a mandatory minimum sentence, the fact that a firearm was a machine gun is an element to be proved to the jury beyond a reasonable doubt, not a sentencing factor to be proved to the judge at sentencing.

Court membership
- Chief Justice John Roberts Associate Justices John P. Stevens · Antonin Scalia; Anthony Kennedy · Clarence Thomas; Ruth Bader Ginsburg · Stephen Breyer; Samuel Alito · Sonia Sotomayor

Case opinions
- Majority: Kennedy, J., joined by Roberts, Stevens, Scalia, Ginsburg, Breyer, Alito, Sotomayor
- Concurrence: Stevens
- Concurrence: Thomas (in judgment)

United States v. O'Brien, 560 U.S. 218 (2010), was a United States Supreme Court case in which the court held that, when used by the prosecution to obtain a mandatory minimum sentence, the fact that a firearm was a machine gun is an element to be proved to the jury beyond a reasonable doubt, not a sentencing factor to be proved to the judge at sentencing.

== Background ==
O'Brien and Burgess each carried a firearm during an attempted robbery. Count three of their indictment charged them with using a firearm in furtherance of a crime of violence, which carries a mandatory minimum 5-year prison term under 18 U. S. C. §924(c)(1)(A)(i). Count four alleged use of a machine gun (here, a pistol that authorities believed operated as a fully automatic firearm) in furtherance of that crime, which carries a 30-year mandatory-minimum term under §924(c)(1)(B)(ii). The government moved to dismiss the fourth count on the basis that it could not establish the count beyond a reasonable doubt, but it maintained that §924(c)(1)(B)(ii)'s machine gun provision was a sentencing enhancement to be determined by the federal District Court upon a conviction on count three. The court dismissed count four and rejected the Government's sentencing-enhancement position. The defendants then pleaded guilty to the remaining counts. The court sentenced O'Brien to a 102-month term and Burgess to an 84-month term for their §924(c) convictions. In affirming the District Court's §924(c)(1)(B)(ii) ruling, the First Circuit Court of Appeals looked primarily to Castillo v. United States, 530 U. S. 120, which held that the machine-gun provision in an earlier version of §924(c) constituted an element of an offense, not a sentencing factor. The court found that Castillo was "close to binding," absent clearer or more dramatic changes than those made by Congress's 1998 amendment of §924(c) or a clearer legislative history.

== Opinion of the court ==
Oral argument was heard on February 23, 2010. The Supreme Court issued a unanimous opinion on May 24, 2010, affirming the First Circuit. Justice Anthony Kennedy wrote the opinion of the Court, joined by Chief Justice John Roberts and Justices John Paul Stevens, Antonin Scalia, Ruth Bader Ginsburg, Stephen Breyer, Samuel Alito, and Sonia Sotomayor.

The Court declined to reach the constitutional question and resolved the case on statutory grounds, relying on its prior decision in Castillo v. United States, 530 U.S. 120 (2000), which had held that the machine gun provision in the earlier version of §924(c) was an element of the offense rather than a sentencing factor. Reviewing the five factors that guided Castillo—language and structure, tradition, risk of unfairness, severity of the sentence, and legislative history—the Court found that Congress's 1998 amendments to §924(c) had not made the kind of clear change required to alter that characterization. The Court characterized the reorganization of the statute as a drafting update rather than a substantive shift, and reasoned that severity, tradition, and the risk of unfair fact-finding still pointed toward treating the machine gun fact as an element.

=== Concurrences ===
Justice Stevens filed a concurring opinion in which he joined the Court's statutory analysis but wrote separately to express agreement with Justice Thomas that Harris v. United States, 536 U.S. 545 (2002), and McMillan v. Pennsylvania, 477 U.S. 79 (1986), were inconsistent with Apprendi v. New Jersey and should be revisited.

Justice Clarence Thomas concurred in the judgment only. He would have decided the case on constitutional grounds and overruled Harris, taking the position that any fact that increases a defendant's statutorily mandated sentencing range—including the floor set by a mandatory minimum—must be found by a jury beyond a reasonable doubt.

== Later developments ==
In Alleyne v. United States, 570 U.S. 99 (2013), the Court adopted the constitutional position Justices Thomas and Stevens had urged in their O'Brien concurrences, expressly overruling Harris v. United States and holding that any fact that increases a mandatory minimum sentence is an element of the offense that must be submitted to the jury and found beyond a reasonable doubt. Writing for the majority, Justice Thomas cited O'Brien for the proposition that the touchstone for whether a fact must be found by the jury is whether it constitutes an element of the charged offense.
