= Renico v. Lett =

- Supreme Court of the United States

Decided May 3, 2010
- Full case name: Renico v. Lett
- Citations: 559 U.S. 766 (more)

Holding
- The trial court's decision in this case was not unreasonable under AEDPA. A federal habeas court must be deferential to the state trial court, including its decision about whether a jury was deadlocked.

Court membership
- Chief Justice John Roberts Associate Justices John P. Stevens · Antonin Scalia; Anthony Kennedy · Clarence Thomas; Ruth Bader Ginsburg · Stephen Breyer; Samuel Alito · Sonia Sotomayor

Case opinions
- Majority: Roberts, joined by Scalia, Kennedy, Thomas, Ginsburg, Alito
- Dissent: Stevens, joined by Sotomayor; Breyer (Parts I and II)

Laws applied
- Antiterrorism and Effective Death Penalty Act of 1996

Renico v. Lett, 559 U.S. 766 (2010), was a United States Supreme Court case in which the court held that the trial court's decision in this case was not unreasonable under the Antiterrorism and Effective Death Penalty Act of 1996. A federal habeas court must be deferential to the state trial court, including its decision about whether a jury was deadlocked.

== Background ==
From jury selection to jury instructions in a Michigan court, Lett's first trial for, among other things, first-degree murder took less than nine hours. During approximately four hours of deliberations, the jury sent the trial court seven notes, including one asking what would happen if the jury could not agree. The judge called the jury and the attorneys into the courtroom and questioned the foreperson, who said that the jury was unable to reach a unanimous verdict. The judge then declared a mistrial, dismissed the jury, and scheduled a new trial. At Lett's second trial, after deliberating for only 3 hours and 15 minutes, a new jury found him guilty of second-degree murder.

On appeal within the state's system, Lett argued that because the judge in his first trial had announced a mistrial without any manifest necessity to do so, the Double Jeopardy Clause barred the state from trying him a second time. Agreeing, the Michigan Court of Appeals reversed the conviction.

The Michigan Supreme Court reversed. It concluded that, under United States v. Perez (1824), a defendant may be retried following the discharge of a deadlocked jury so long as the trial court exercised its "sound discretion" in concluding that the jury was deadlocked and thus that there was a "manifest necessity" for a mistrial; and that, under Arizona v. Washington, 434 U. S. 497 (1978), an appellate court must generally defer to a trial judge's determination that a deadlock has been reached. The Michigan Supreme Court then found that the judge at Lett's first trial had not abused her discretion in declaring the mistrial, observing that the jury had deliberated a sufficient amount of time following a short, noncomplex trial; that the jury had sent several notes, including one appearing to indicate heated discussions; and that the foreperson had stated that the jury could not reach a verdict.

In Lett's federal habeas petition, he contended that the Michigan Supreme Court's rejection of his double jeopardy claim was "an unreasonable application of... clearly established Federal law, as determined by the Supreme Court of the United States," and thus that he was not barred by the Antiterrorism and Effective Death Penalty Act of 1996 (AEDPA) from obtaining federal habeas relief. The federal District Court granted the writ, and the Sixth Circuit Court of Appeals affirmed.

== Opinion of the court ==
The Supreme Court issued an opinion on May 3, 2010. The Supreme Court held that the state trial court's decision was not unreasonable for the purposes of AEDPA and reversed the Sixth Circuit. This cancelled Lett's federal writ of habeas corpus.
