= United States v. Marcus =

- Supreme Court of the United States

Decided May 24, 2010
- Full case name: United States v. Marcus
- Citations: 560 U.S. 258 (more)

Holding
- An appellate court may reverse a conviction based on a plain error raised for the first time on appeal when there is a reasonable probability that the error affected the trial's outcome.

Court membership
- Chief Justice John Roberts Associate Justices John P. Stevens · Antonin Scalia; Anthony Kennedy · Clarence Thomas; Ruth Bader Ginsburg · Stephen Breyer; Samuel Alito · Sonia Sotomayor

Case opinions
- Majority: Breyer, joined by Roberts, Scalia, Kennedy, Thomas, Ginsburg, Alito
- Dissent: Stevens
- Sotomayor took no part in the consideration or decision of the case.

Laws applied
- Fed. R. Crim. P. 52(b)

United States v. Marcus, 560 U.S. 258 (2010), was a United States Supreme Court case in which the court held that an appellate court may reverse a conviction based on a plain error raised for the first time on appeal when there is a reasonable probability that the error affected the trial's outcome. Here, the lower court reversed because there was "any possibility", however remote, that this had happened. According to the Supreme Court, the proper plain error test requires the appellant to show that (1) there is an error; (2) the error is clear or obvious; (3) the error affected the appellant's substantial rights; and (4) the error seriously affects the fairness, integrity, or public reputation of judicial proceedings.

== Background ==
Marcus was convicted of engaging in forced labor and sex trafficking between January 1999 and October 2001. On appeal, he pointed out for the first time that the federal statutes he violated did not become law until October 2000. Thus, he claimed, the indictment and evidence permitted at trial allowed a jury to convict him exclusively on the basis of pre-enactment conduct in violation of the Ex Post Facto Clause. He conceded that he had not raised this objection in the federal District Court, but he argued that because the constitutional error was plain, his conviction must be set aside. The Second Circuit Court of Appeals agreed and vacated the conviction. In doing so, the court held that, even in the case of a continuing offense, retrial is necessary if there is "any possibility, no matter how unlikely, that the jury could have convicted based exclusively on pre-enactment conduct." The court noted that this was "true even under plain error review."

== Opinion of the court ==
The Supreme Court issued an opinion on May 24, 2010.

Justice Stevens dissented. Although he agreed that the majority "fairly summarizes our 'plain error' cases and shows how the Court of Appeals applied a novel standard of review," he did not think reversing the lower court was necessary. He said, "I am convinced that the error prejudiced Marcus and seriously undermined the integrity of the proceedings. While I do not endorse the reasoning in the Court of Appeals' opinion, I would therefore affirm its judgment."
