= Conkright v. Frommert =

- Supreme Court of the United States

Decided April 21, 2010
- Full case name: Conkright v. Frommert
- Citations: 559 U.S. 506 (more)

Holding
- The administrator of an ERISA plan is entitled to deference in matters of interpretation, even when the administrator had previously adopted a different interpretation that a court found erroneous.

Court membership
- Chief Justice John Roberts Associate Justices John P. Stevens · Antonin Scalia; Anthony Kennedy · Clarence Thomas; Ruth Bader Ginsburg · Stephen Breyer; Samuel Alito · Sonia Sotomayor

Case opinions
- Majority: Roberts
- Dissent: Breyer, joined by Stevens, Ginsburg
- Sotomayor took no part in the consideration or decision of the case.

Conkright v. Frommert, 559 U.S. 506 (2010), was a United States Supreme Court case in which the court held that the administrator of an ERISA plan is entitled to deference in matters of interpretation, even when the administrator had previously adopted a different interpretation that a court found erroneous.

== Background ==
The petitioners in this case were Xerox Corporation's pension plan (Plan) and the Plan's current and former administrators (Plan Administrator). The respondents were employees who left Xerox in the 1980s, received lump-sum distributions of retirement benefits earned up to that point, and were later rehired. To account for the past distributions when calculating respondents' current benefits, the Plan Administrator initially interpreted the Plan to call for an approach that has come to be known as the "phantom account" method. Respondents challenged that method in an action under the Employee Retirement Income Security Act of 1974 (ERISA).

The federal District Court granted summary judgment for the Plan, but the Second Circuit Court of Appeals vacated and remanded. It held that the Plan Administrator's interpretation was unreasonable and that respondents had not received adequate notice that the phantom account method would be used to calculate their benefits. On remand, the Plan Administrator proposed a new interpretation of the Plan that accounted for the time value of the money respondents had previously received. The District Court declined to apply a deferential standard to this interpretation, and adopted instead an approach proposed by respondents that did not account for the time value of money. Affirming in relevant part, the Second Circuit held that the District Court was correct not to apply a deferential standard on remand, and that the District Court's decision on the merits was not an abuse of discretion.

== Opinion of the court ==
The Supreme Court issued an opinion on April 21, 2010.
