= Hemi Group, LLC v. City of New York =

- Supreme Court of the United States

Decided January 25, 2010
- Full case name: Hemi Group, LLC v. City of New York
- Citations: 559 U.S. 1 (more)

Holding
- The Racketeer Influenced and Corrupt Organizations Act cannot be used by a city to collect damages against out-of-state internet vendors who fail to pay city cigarette taxes.

Court membership
- Chief Justice John Roberts Associate Justices John P. Stevens · Antonin Scalia; Anthony Kennedy · Clarence Thomas; Ruth Bader Ginsburg · Stephen Breyer; Samuel Alito · Sonia Sotomayor

Case opinions
- Majority: Roberts, joined by Scalia, Thomas, Alito; Ginsberg (in part)
- Concurrence: Ginsburg (in judgment)
- Dissent: Breyer, joined by Stevens, Kennedy
- Sotomayor took no part in the consideration or decision of the case.

Laws applied
- Racketeer Influenced and Corrupt Organizations Act

Hemi Group, LLC v. City of New York, 559 U.S. 1 (2010), was a United States Supreme Court case in which the court held that the Racketeer Influenced and Corrupt Organizations Act cannot be used by a city to collect damages against out-of-state internet vendors who fail to pay city cigarette taxes.

== Background ==
New York City taxes the possession of cigarettes. Hemi Group, based in New Mexico, sells cigarettes online to residents of the city. Neither state nor city law required out-of-state sellers such as Hemi to charge, collect, or remit the city's tax; instead, the City recovered its tax on out-of-state sales directly from the purchasers. However, the federal PACT Act requires out-of-state sellers to submit customer information to the states into which they ship cigarettes, and New York State agreed to forward that information to the city. That information helped the City track down cigarette purchasers who did not pay their taxes. Against that backdrop, the City filed a lawsuit under the Racketeer Influenced and Corrupt Organizations Act (RICO), alleging that Hemi's failure to file the Jenkins Act reports with the State constituted mail and wire fraud, which are defined as "racketeering activit[ies]" subject to enforcement under civil RICO. The federal District Court dismissed the claims, but the Second Circuit Court of Appeals vacated the judgment and remanded. Among other things, the Court of Appeals held that the city's asserted injury—lost tax revenue—came about "by reason of" the predicate mail and wire frauds. It accordingly determined that the city had stated a valid RICO claim.

== Opinion of the court ==
The Supreme Court issued an opinion on January 25, 2010. The court reversed, saying the RICO claim was not valid.
