= Bloate v. United States =

- Supreme Court of the United States

Decided March 8, 2010
- Full case name: Bloate v. United States
- Citations: 559 U.S. 196 (more)

Holding
- The time granted to prepare pretrial motions is not automatically excludable from the Speedy Trial Act's 70-day limit for bringing a case to trial. Such time may be excluded only when a district court grants a continuance based on appropriate findings under the act's subsection (h)(7).

Court membership
- Chief Justice John Roberts Associate Justices John P. Stevens · Antonin Scalia; Anthony Kennedy · Clarence Thomas; Ruth Bader Ginsburg · Stephen Breyer; Samuel Alito · Sonia Sotomayor

Case opinions
- Majority: Thomas, joined by Roberts, Stevens, Scalia, Kennedy, Ginsburg, Sotomayor
- Concurrence: Ginsburg
- Dissent: Alito, joined by Breyer

Laws applied
- Speedy Trial Act of 1974

Bloate v. United States, 559 U.S. 196 (2010), was a United States Supreme Court case in which the court held that the time granted to prepare pretrial motions is not automatically excludable from the Speedy Trial Act's 70-day limit for bringing a case to trial. Such time may be excluded only when a district court grants a continuance based on appropriate findings under the act's subsection (h)(7).

== Background ==
The Speedy Trial Act of 1974 (Act) requires a criminal defendant's trial to commence within 70 days of the indictment or initial appearance, and it entitles them to dismissal of the charges if that deadline is not met. Subsection (h)(1) of the act automatically excludes from the 70-day period "delay resulting from... proceedings concerning the defendant", and it separately permits a district court to exclude "delay resulting from a continuance" it grants, provided the court makes findings required by Subsection (h)(7) of the act.

Bloate's indictment on federal firearm and drug possession charges started the 70-day clock on August 24, 2006. After Bloate's arraignment, the Magistrate Judge ordered the parties to file pretrial motions by September 13. On September 7, the court granted Bloate's motion to extend that deadline. However, on the new due date, September 25, Bloate waived his right to file pretrial motions. On October 4, the Magistrate Judge found the waiver voluntary and intelligent. Over the next three months, Bloate's trial was delayed several times by both parties. On February 19, 2007—179 days after he was indicted—he moved to dismiss the indictment, claiming that the Act's 70-day limit had elapsed. In denying the motion, the federal District Court excluded the time from September 7 through October 4 as pretrial motion preparation time. At trial, Bloate was found guilty on both counts and sentenced to concurrent prison terms. The Eighth Circuit Court of Appeals affirmed the denial of the motion to dismiss, holding that the period from September 7 through October 4 was automatically excludable from the 70-day limit under subsection (h)(1).

== Opinion of the court ==
The Supreme Court issued an opinion on March 8, 2010.
