= Barber v. Thomas =

- Supreme Court of the United States

Argued March 30, 2010 Decided June 7, 2010
- Full case name: Michael Gary Barber, et al., Petitioners v. J. E. Thomas, Warden
- Docket no.: 09-5201
- Citations: 560 U.S. 474 (more) 130 S. Ct. 2499; 177 L. Ed. 2d 1; 78 USLW 4509; 10 Cal. Daily Op. Serv. 6983; 2010 Daily Journal D.A.R. 8311; 22 Fla. L. Weekly Fed. S 419

Holding
- Incarcerated people in federal prison accrue good time credits at the end of each year of actual incarceration, not an amount allocated based on the total number of years of incarceration prescribed at their sentencing.

Court membership
- Chief Justice John Roberts Associate Justices John P. Stevens · Antonin Scalia; Anthony Kennedy · Clarence Thomas; Ruth Bader Ginsburg · Stephen Breyer; Samuel Alito · Sonia Sotomayor

Case opinions
- Majority: Breyer, joined by Roberts, Scalia, Thomas, Alito, Sotomayor
- Dissent: Kennedy, joined by Stevens, Ginsburg

Barber v. Thomas, 560 U.S. 474 (2010), is a United States Supreme Court case in which the Court held that incarcerated people in federal prison accrue good time credits at the end of each year of actual incarceration, not an amount allocated based on the total number of years of incarceration prescribed at their sentencing. This meant that they could reduce their sentences by up to 54 days per year of actual imprisonment for exhibiting good behavior. The case concerned how the United States Federal Bureau of Prisons should calculate "good time credits": whether they should be calculated based on the length of the sentence levied by the judge, or by the time actually served by the inmate.

== Background ==
The petitioner, Michael Barber, sought habeas corpus in a federal district court. He argued that the Bureau of Prisons "inaccurately calculated his good time credit toward the service of his federal sentence." Barber argued that the BOP should have calculated good time credit based on the sentence imposed rather than the time actually served in prison. Barber's petition was denied by the district court, on appeal the Ninth Circuit affirmed the ruling of the lower courts citing Tablada v. Daniels noting that the good time credit statute was ambiguous and the BOP's interpretation was reasonable.

== Opinion of the Court ==
The court affirmed the lower court's ruling with a 6–3 vote. Barber's attorneys argued that by allowing up to 54 days' credit for each year "of the prisoner's term of imprisonment," Congress intended federal sentences to be reduced by as much as 54 days for each year of the sentence imposed by the judge. The government argued that the reduction applied at the end of each year that is actually served. Under that interpretation, which prevailed, since the sentence keeps being reduced year after year, less credit in total is awarded. The difference is about one week per year for every federal prisoner serving a term of more than a year's duration. Justice Stephen Breyer wrote the majority opinion, while Justice Anthony Kennedy wrote the dissent.
