= Kucana v. Holder =

- Supreme Court of the United States

Argued November 10, 2009 Decided January 20, 2010
- Full case name: Agron Kucana, Petitioner v. Eric H. Holder, Jr., Attorney General
- Docket no.: 08-911
- Citations: 558 U.S. 233 (more) 130 S.Ct. 827

Holding
- The statute that makes certain discretionary determinations of the Attorney General immune to judicial review does not allow the Attorney General to declare determinations discretionary and immune to review via regulations.

Court membership
- Chief Justice John Roberts Associate Justices John P. Stevens · Antonin Scalia; Anthony Kennedy · Clarence Thomas; Ruth Bader Ginsburg · Stephen Breyer; Samuel Alito · Sonia Sotomayor

Case opinions
- Majority: Ginsberg, joined by Roberts, Stevens, Scalia, Kennedy, Thomas, Breyer, Sotomayor
- Concurrence: Alito

Laws applied
- 8 U.S.C. § 1252(a)(2)(B)(ii)

Kucana v. Holder, 558 U.S. 233 (2010), was a United States Supreme Court case in which the Court held that the statute that makes certain discretionary determinations of the attorney general immune to judicial review does not allow the attorney general to declare determinations discretionary and immune to review via regulations.

== Statute ==
The case involved the Illegal Immigration Reform and Immigrant Responsibility Act of 1996 which amended the Immigration and Nationality Act. The changes made by IIRIRA restricted judicial review of the Attorney General's actions "the authority for which is specified under this subchapter to be in the discretion of the Attorney General".

== Background ==
Agron Kucana applied for asylum in the late 1990s after overstaying a business visa. He did not go to the hearing, and was ordered removed. The Immigration Judge and Board of Immigration Appeals (BIA) would not reopen his case when he told them he overslept. Instead of leaving the country, Kucana filed a motion to present new evidence for his asylum claim. His request was again denied. The Seventh Circuit refused, on jurisdictional grounds, contrary to other circuit courts , to hear Kucana's abuse of discretion claim.

The Supreme Court granted certiorari to decide whether 8 USC § 1252(a)(2)(B) applies to determinations "declared discretionary by the Attorney General himself through regulation".

== Supreme Court ==
Solicitor General Elena Kagan declined to defend the position of the Seventh Circuit, and the Supreme Court appointed an amicus curiae to argue in support of the judgment below.

=== Decision ===
Justice Ruth Bader Ginsburg, writing for a unanimous court, held that federal courts have jurisdiction to review the BIA's decisions on motions to reopen immigration cases. Separation of powers concerns caution "against reading legislation, absent clear statement, to place in executive hands authority to remove cases from the Judiciary's domain". Analyzing the text and structure of the statute, the Court did not find a clear statement that would overcome the presumption.

The court reviewed the history of the "well-settled" presumption in favor of judicial review of administrative action. The statute does not allow the judiciary to review certain enumerated "substantive decisions... made by the Executive in the immigration context as a matter of grace, things that involve whether aliens can stay in the country or not." The motion to reopen, on the other hand, is an "adjunct procedure" that provides "a fair chance to have [claims] heard".

== See also ==
- Statutory construction
