= Levin v. Commerce Energy, Inc. =

- Supreme Court of the United States

Decided June 1, 2010
- Full case name: Levin v. Commerce Energy, Inc.
- Citations: 560 U.S. 413 (more)

Holding
- Under the comity doctrine, a taxpayer's complaint of allegedly discriminatory state taxation must proceed originally in state court even when the complaint is framed as a request to increase a competitor's tax burden.

Court membership
- Chief Justice John Roberts Associate Justices John P. Stevens · Antonin Scalia; Anthony Kennedy · Clarence Thomas; Ruth Bader Ginsburg · Stephen Breyer; Samuel Alito · Sonia Sotomayor

Case opinions
- Majority: Ginsburg, joined by Roberts, Stevens, Kennedy, Breyer, Sotomayor
- Concurrence: Kennedy
- Concurrence: Thomas (in judgment), joined by Scalia
- Concurrence: Alito (in judgment)

Levin v. Commerce Energy, Inc., 560 U.S. 413 (2010), was a United States Supreme Court case in which the court held that, under the comity doctrine, a taxpayer's complaint of allegedly discriminatory state taxation must proceed originally in state court even when the complaint is framed as a request to increase a competitor's tax burden.

== Background ==
Historically, all Ohio natural gas consumers purchased gas from a local distribution company (LDC), the public utility serving their geographic area. As of 2010, however, consumers in Ohio's major metropolitan areas could alternatively contract with independent marketers (IMs) that compete with LDCs for retail sales of natural gas.

A group of plaintiffs, mostly IMs offering to sell natural gas to Ohio consumers (including Commerce Energy), sued the Ohio Tax Commissioner (Commissioner) in federal district court, alleging discriminatory taxation of IMs and their patrons in violation of the Commerce and Equal Protection Clauses. They sought declaratory and injunctive relief invalidating three tax exemptions Ohio granted exclusively to LDCs. The court initially held that the suit was not blocked by the Tax Injunction Act (TIA), which prohibits lower federal courts from restraining "the assessment, levy or collection of any tax under State law where a plain, speedy and efficient remedy may be had in the courts of such State," 28 U. S. C. §1341. Nevertheless, the court dismissed the suit based on the more embracive comity doctrine, which restrains federal courts from entertaining claims that risk disrupting state tax administration.

The Sixth Circuit Court of Appeals agreed with the District Court's TIA holding, but reversed the court's comity ruling, and remanded for adjudication of the merits. The Court of Appeals believed that Footnote 9 in Hibbs v. Winn, 542 U. S. 88, foreclosed an expansive reading of this Court's comity precedents. The footnote stated that the Court "has relied upon 'principles of comity' to preclude original federal-court jurisdiction only when plaintiffs have sought district-court aid in order to arrest or countermand state tax collection." The plaintiffs challenged only a few limited exemptions, the Sixth Circuit observed; therefore, their success on the merits would not significantly intrude upon Ohio's administration of its tax system.

In so ruling, the Sixth Circuit agreed with the Seventh and Ninth Circuits, which had similarly read Hibbs to rein in the comity doctrine, and it disagreed with the Fourth Circuit, which had concluded that Hibbs left the comity doctrine untouched. Noting that the plaintiffs "challenge[d] only a few limited exemptions," and satisfied, therefore, that "[respondents'] success would not significantly intrude upon traditional matters of state taxation," the Sixth Circuit remanded the case for adjudication of the merits.

After unsuccessfully moving for rehearing en banc, the Commissioner petitioned for certiorari. By then, the First Circuit had joined the Sixth, Seventh, and Ninth Circuits in holding that Hibbs sharply limited the scope of the comity bar. The Supreme Court granted certiorari to resolve the circuit split.

== Opinion of the court ==
The Supreme Court issued an opinion on June 1, 2010.

Justice Alito's concurrence merely noted that he "doubtful about the Court's efforts to distinguish Hibbs v. Winn" from this case, but he felt it was not necessary to decide whether Levin seriously undermined Hibbs at that time. Justice Kennedy's concurrence was much the same, and it noted that he joined the opinion with the understanding that Levin was not expanding Hibbs.
