= Schwab v. Reilly =

- Supreme Court of the United States

Argued November 3, 2009 Decided June 17, 2010
- Full case name: Schwab v. Reilly
- Docket no.: 08-538
- Citations: 560 U.S. 770 (more)

Holding
- When the bankruptcy allows the debtor to exempt a dollar value corresponding to specific property from seizure by creditors, claiming the full anticipated dollar value of the property does not exempt the property from seizure if the true dollar value of the property is greater than anticipated.

Court membership
- Chief Justice John Roberts Associate Justices John P. Stevens · Antonin Scalia; Anthony Kennedy · Clarence Thomas; Ruth Bader Ginsburg · Stephen Breyer; Samuel Alito · Sonia Sotomayor

Case opinions
- Majority: Thomas, joined by Stevens, Scalia, Kennedy, Alito, Sotomayor
- Dissent: Ginsburg, joined by Roberts, Breyer

Laws applied
- 11 U.S.C. § 522; Federal Rules of Bankruptcy Procedure 4003(b)

Schwab v. Reilly, 560 U.S. 770 (2010), was a United States Supreme Court case in which the court held that, when the Bankruptcy Code allows the debtor to exempt a dollar value corresponding to specific property from seizure by creditors, claiming the full anticipated dollar value of the property does not exempt the property from seizure if the true dollar value of the property is greater than anticipated. Additionally, the bankruptcy trustee representing the bankruptcy estate does not need to object to the anticipated valuation to preserve the ability to seize and auction the property, giving the claimed dollar value to the debtor.

== Background ==
Reilly filed for Chapter 7 bankruptcy when her catering business failed. She supported her petition with Schedule B, on which debtors must list their assets, and Schedule C, on which they must list the property they wish to reclaim as exempt. Her Schedule B assets included cooking and other kitchen equipment, to which she assigned an estimated market value of $10,718. On Schedule C, she claimed two exempt interests in this "business equipment": a "tool[s] of the trade" exemption for the statutory-maximum "$1,850 in value," and $8,868 under the statutory provisions allowing miscellaneous, or "wildcard," exemptions up to $10,225 in value. The claimed exemptions' total value ($10,718) equaled Reilly's estimate of the equipment's market value. Property claimed as exempt will be excluded from the bankruptcy estate "[u]nless a party in interest" objects within a certain 30-day period, pursuant to Federal Rule of Bankruptcy Procedure 4003(b). Absent an objection, the property will be excluded from the estate even if the exemption's value exceeds what the Code permits. This sort of situation was contemplated in Taylor v. Freeland & Kronz, 503 U.S. 638, which described a situation when an objection is required.

Although an appraisal revealed that the equipment's total market value could be as much as $17,200, Schwab, the bankruptcy estate's trustee, did not object to the claimed exemptions because the dollar value Reilly assigned to each fell within the statutory limits. Schwab moved the Bankruptcy Court for permission to auction the equipment so Reilly could receive the $10,718 she claimed exempt and the estate could distribute the remaining value to her creditors. Reilly countered that by equating on Schedule C the total value of her claimed exemptions in the equipment with the equipment's estimated market value, she had put Schwab and her creditors on notice that she intended to exempt the equipment's full value, even if it turned out to be more than the amounts she declared and that the Code allowed. She asserted that the estate had forfeited its claim to any portion of that value because Schwab had not objected within the Rule 4003(b) period, and that she would dismiss her petition rather than sell her equipment.

The Bankruptcy Court denied Schwab's motion and Reilly's conditional motion to dismiss. The federal District Court denied Schwab relief, rejecting his argument that neither the Code nor Rule 4003(b) requires a trustee to object to a claimed exemption where the amount the debtor declares as the exemption's value is within the limits the Code prescribes. Affirming, the Third Circuit Court of Appeals agreed that Reilly's Schedule C entries indicated her intent to exempt the equipment's full value. Relying on Taylor, it held that Schwab's failure to object entitled Reilly to exempt the full value of her equipment, even though that value exceeded the amounts that Reilly declared and the Code permitted.

== Opinion of the court ==
The case was argued on November 3, 2009, and the Supreme Court issued its opinion on June 17, 2010. Justice Thomas delivered the opinion of the Court, joined by Justices Stevens, Scalia, Kennedy, Alito, and Sotomayor.

The majority's analysis turned on the text of 11 U.S.C. § 522. Writing for six Justices, Thomas reasoned that the Bankruptcy Code defines the "property claimed as exempt" as the debtor's "interest" up to a specified dollar amount in a listed asset, rather than as the asset itself. Because Reilly had listed dollar amounts for her exemptions that fell facially within the statutory limits, the trustee had no duty to object in order to preserve the estate's right to any value in the equipment beyond those declared amounts. The Court further distinguished its earlier precedent in Taylor v. Freeland & Kronz, 503 U.S. 638, explaining that Taylor required a trustee's objection only where the amount listed as the "value claimed exempt" was not within statutory limits a situation triggered in Taylor by the debtor listing the value as "$ unknown." Here, by contrast, Reilly's specific dollar figures were facially valid, so no such warning flag arose. The Court cautioned that Reilly's approach would risk allowing debtors to turn the Code's goal of a fresh start "into a free pass," and held that a debtor who wishes to exempt an entire asset's full market value must declare the exemption in a manner that makes that intent explicit. The Third Circuit's judgment was reversed and the case was remanded for further proceedings.

Justice Ginsburg filed a dissent, joined by Chief Justice Roberts and Justice Breyer. In her view, Reilly's filing which listed identical figures for both the estimated market value and the claimed exemption was a sufficiently clear signal that she intended to exempt the property itself, not merely a dollar-value interest in it, and the trustee's failure to object within the Rule 4003(b) period should have been dispositive.

== Later developments ==
The Supreme Court's decision reversed and remanded the Third Circuit's judgment in Schwab v. Reilly, 534 F.3d 173, for further proceedings consistent with the opinion.
