= Florida v. Powell =

- Supreme Court of the United States

Argued December 7, 2009 Decided February 23, 2010
- Full case name: Florida v. Powell
- Docket no.: 08-1157
- Citations: 559 U.S. 50 (more)

Questions presented
- 1. Does the Supreme Court have jurisdiction to decide a case that involved, in part, provisions of the Florida Constitution?; 2. Is a Miranda warning valid if it advises a suspect of his right to consult an attorney "before questioning" and his right to consult a lawyer "at any time during the questioning", but not his right to the physical presence of an attorney during questioning?

Holding
- 1. In cases where federal law appears to control a state court's jurisdiction, the Supreme Court retains jurisdiction.; 2. The warning given to the defendant in this case was adequate, as it reasonably conveyed to him his rights as required by Miranda.

Court membership
- Chief Justice John Roberts Associate Justices John P. Stevens · Antonin Scalia; Anthony Kennedy · Clarence Thomas; Ruth Bader Ginsburg · Stephen Breyer; Samuel Alito · Sonia Sotomayor

Case opinions
- Majority: Ginsburg, joined by Roberts, Scalia, Kennedy, Thomas, Alito, Sotomayor; Breyer (Part II)
- Dissent: Stevens, joined by Breyer (Part II)

Laws applied
- U.S. Const. amends. V, XIV

Florida v. Powell, 559 U.S. 50 (2010), was a case in which the Supreme Court of the United States ruled on the language requirements for Miranda warnings. In the case, a suspect was advised of his right to consult with an attorney before questioning, as well as his right to consult with an attorney at any time during questioning. However, he was not advised of his right to the physical presence of an attorney during questioning.

== Background ==
On August 10, 2004, officers from the Tampa Police Department sought to apprehend the respondent, Kevin Dewayne Powell, in connection with an ongoing robbery investigation. Officers entered an apartment rented by Powell's girlfriend and spotted him coming from a bedroom. After searching the bedroom, officers recovered one 9-millimeter handgun, and Powell was subsequently arrested.

After he was transported to the headquarters of the Tampa Police Department, officers read Powell the standard departmental consent and release form. It stated:

You have the right to remain silent. If you give up the right to remain silent, anything you say can be used against you in court. You have the right to talk to a lawyer before answering any of our questions. If you cannot afford to hire a lawyer, one will be appointed for you without cost and before any questioning. You have the right to use any of these rights at any time you want during this interview.

Powell acknowledged that he had been informed of his rights, that he understood them, and that he was willing to talk to the police. He signed the departmental consent and release form. He disclosed to police officers that he was aware of his inability (as a convicted felon) to possess a firearm, but that he nonetheless purchased and carried the firearm that police recovered at the apartment.

Powell was charged in a Florida state court with possession of a weapon by a prohibited possessor. He moved to suppress his statements, contending that his Miranda warning was deficient as it did not advise him of the right to the presence of an attorney during questioning. The trial court denied, reasoning that officers had adequately notified Powell of his rights. A jury would later find him guilty of the gun-possession charge.

On appeal, the Florida Second District Court of Appeal held that Powell's statements should have been suppressed, contending that they did not adequately inform Powell of his right to the presence of an attorney throughout the interrogation. The Court of Appeal, recognizing the importance of the issue at hand, recommended the case to the Florida Supreme Court, which affirmed the lower appellate court's decision. It reasoned that both Miranda and the Florida Constitution "require that a suspect be clearly informed of the right to have a lawyer present during questioning", and that the warnings Powell received did not properly inform him of this right.

== Supreme Court Opinions ==
In a 7–2 decision authored by Justice Ginsburg, the court held that it retained jurisdiction over this case, and that the warnings given to Powell before his questioning adequately informed him of his right to the presence of an attorney. Justice Stevens authored a dissenting opinion.

=== Ginsburg's Majority Opinion ===
On the jurisdictional question, Justice Ginsburg concedes that the Florida Supreme Court rested in part on a provision of its own state constitution, in addition to Miranda, in reaching its decision. However, the decision handed down by the Florida Supreme Court appeared to rest heavily on federal law, and that it was interwoven with federal law. Additionally, Ginsburg's opinion casts doubt on the extent to which the Florida law can be seen as independent from federal judicial review. As such, it presumes that the lower court's decision was primarily governed by federal law, and as such the case is federally justiciable.

The court also reversed the holding of the Florida Supreme Court. They agree that Miranda requires that suspects "be warned prior to any questioning" and "that he has the right to the presence of an attorney", but that it does not specify any precise language that must be used in giving these warnings. It simply must reasonably convey to a suspect his rights as required by Miranda. Powell undoubtedly received such warnings.

In its reasoning, the court explains why it would not have been necessary for officers to directly inform Powell of his right to the presence of an attorney. Police had informed Powell that he had the right to consult an attorney before answering "any" of their questions, and not simply the first one. They additionally notified him of his ability to use this right at "any time" he wanted during the interrogation, not simply at the outset. For Powell, or any reasonable person, to reach the opposite conclusion (i.e., that he did not have the right to the presence of an attorney for the duration of the interview) would require dubious reasoning on the part of the suspect. He would have to think that, to consult an attorney, he could leave the room as he wished, consult an attorney, and then return. The court reasoned that a suspect (who had been arrested and taken into police custody) would not infer such a right, under the circumstances, to simply pop in and out as he pleased. Rather, he would come to the more plausible inference that a lawyer would be present with him the whole time.
