= Reed Elsevier, Inc. v. Muchnick =

- Supreme Court of the United States

Argued October 7, 2009 Decided March 2, 2010
- Full case name: Reed Elsevier, Inc., Et Al., Petitioners v. Irvin Muchnick Et Al.
- Docket no.: 08-103
- Citations: 559 U.S. 154 (more) 130 S. Ct. 1237; 176 L. Ed. 2d 18; 93 U.S.P.Q.2d 1719
- Argument: Oral argument

Case history
- Prior: 509 F.3d 116 (2d Cir. 2007); cert. granted, 555 U.S. 1211 (2009).
- Procedural: Writ of certiorari to The United States Court of Appeals for the Second Circuit

Holding
- A copyright holder must register under Section 411 (a) prior to filing a copyright infringement claim. Failure to comply does not restrict a Federal Court's subject jurisdiction over the matter.

Court membership
- Chief Justice John Roberts Associate Justices John P. Stevens · Antonin Scalia; Anthony Kennedy · Clarence Thomas; Ruth Bader Ginsburg · Stephen Breyer; Samuel Alito · Sonia Sotomayor

Case opinions
- Majority: Thomas, joined by Roberts, Scalia, Kennedy, Alito
- Concurrence: Ginsburg (in judgment), joined by Stevens, Breyer
- Sotomayor took no part in the consideration or decision of the case.

Laws applied
- Copyright Act§411(a)

Reed Elsevier, Inc. v. Muchnick, 559 U.S. 154 (2010), was a decision by the Supreme Court of the United States involving copyright law. The Court held that failure to register a copyright under Section 411 (a) of the United States Copyright Act does not limit a Federal Court's jurisdiction over claims of infringement regarding unregistered works.

== Background and facts of the case ==
=== Copyright lawsuits for unregistered works ===
The case is part of a long series of controversies in US courts about the remedies available for authors who failed to register their copyrights before bringing suit. As of 2014, no case was known where an author was considered to have a legitimate excuse for not having first registered its copyright.

=== District Court proceedings ===
Reed Elsevier Inc. (et al.), the petitioners of this case, publish electronic content for other companies, such as The New York Times. The respondents, Irvin Muchnick, (et al.), are freelance writers and trade groups who represent other writers. In the 1980s, Elsevier gathered newspaper, magazine and journal articles and converted them to electronic format. It then sold access to these files without permission from the original writers. This resulted in the respondents initiating a class-action lawsuit against Elsevier for copyright infringement in the Southern District Court of New York. The Supreme Court of the United States had previously held, in New York Times Co. v. Tasini, that § 201(c) of the United States Copyright Act bars publishers from reproducing freelance works electronically without authorization specifically for the purpose. Tasini brought about the removal of "hundreds of thousands" of print media republished by those without proper permission. Eventually, the parties in Elsevier agreed to settle. Their agreement required compensation (up to $18 million) to the original publishers of the works that were reprinted without authorization. In return, the authors would release the publishers from liability regarding the unauthorized articles. As the District Court prepared for the settlement, the plaintiffs, led by Muchnick, objected to the settlement, questioning its fairness, but not the District Court's jurisdiction over the matter. The District Court overruled this objection and granted the settlement in September 2005. The objectors appealed this decision to the Second Circuit Court of Appeals.

=== Appellate Court proceedings ===
The Second Circuit held, sua sponte, that the District Court did not have jurisdiction over the previous claims, nor authority for settlement approval with respect to those claims. The Second Circuit cited § 411 (a) of the United States Copyright Act as support, as the act states: "no action for infringement of the copyright in any United States work shall be instituted until preregistration or registration of the copyright claim has been made in accordance with this title.” The Second Circuit both vacated and remanded the prior court's judgement. The Supreme Court granted certiorari on March 2, 2009.

== Supreme Court proceedings ==
The United States Supreme Court granted certiorari to review Elsevier on March 2, 2009. The court addressed the question, "Does 17 U.S.C. §411(a) restrict the subject matter jurisdiction of the federal courts over copyright infringement actions?" This rule states:

[N]o civil action for infringement of the copyright in any United States work shall be instituted until preregistration or registration of the copyright claim has been made in accordance with this title. In any case, however, where the deposit, application, and fee required for registration have been delivered to the Copyright Office in proper form and registration has been refused, the applicant is entitled to institute a civil action for infringement if notice thereof, with a copy of the complaint, is served on the Register of Copyrights. The Register may, at his or her option, become a party to the action with respect to the issue of registrability of the copyright claim by entering an appearance within sixty days after such service, but the Register’s failure to become a party shall not deprive the court of jurisdiction to determine that issue. The petitioners argued that the registration requirement of §411(a) is a mandatory prerequisite to initiating a lawsuit based on claim of infringement and is not a restriction on the federal court's jurisdiction.

Speaking on the purpose of the statute, they also argued that Congress never intended the registration requirement to affect jurisdiction and that the circuit courts interpreting this had failed to present the "bright line" test present in Arbaugh v. Y & H Corp. Regardless of whether or not §411(a) is jurisdictional, the petitioners pointed out that the restriction would apply only to initiating actions, not settling them, as jurisdiction over an action generally extends to settlements that release claims that the court lacked authority to try. The petitioners cautioned the court that, if the Second Circuit's "drive-by" jurisdictional characterization of §411(a) were allowed to stand, it would block “the ability of parties to reach negotiated resolutions of their disputes involving unregistered works” and leave “the nation’s electronic databases and archives. . . permanently depleted." The Respondents presented similar arguments, expressing that §411(a) does not limit jurisdiction but rather functions as a 'claim-processing rule,' as a prerequisite to lawsuit that could either be enforced or waived by defendants. To support this, Respondents cited several circuit court opinions where the jurisdiction requirement was waived or eased and thus treated "in a manner fundamentally inconsistent with its being subject matter jurisdictional.” Respondents also argued that, even if the district court lacked subject matter jurisdiction in regard to the case, it possessed supplemental jurisdiction because the claims of the authors with unregistered copyrights arose from the same case or argument as those authors holding registered copyrights. The United States, acting as Amicus curiae, advocated vacatur of the Second Circuit's decision. They, similarly to Petitioners, argued that §411(a) does not limit a federal court's subject matter jurisdiction, but acts as a mandatory prerequisite to lawsuit that should be strictly enforced, when raised by a party. The United States argued that, even though district courts should normally enforce §411(a) Sua sponte (even without a defendant's motion for dismissal), once the case has reached the court of appeals, the district court would have expended its resources enough for the strict application of §411(a) to be considered a waste of judicial resources. As a result, the U.S. argued that non-compliance with the registration requirement should not be seen as a basis for vacating the district court's ruling. As both parties argued for the same outcome, the Supreme Court appointed Deborah Jones Merritt to serve as amicus curiae, supporting the second circuit's judgement. Merritt argued that, not only does §411(a) clearly restrict the subject matter jurisdiction of federal courts, but courts, scholars, and legislators have previously interpreted §411(a) as being jurisdictional. She also argued that §411(a) serves vital public purposes such as supporting a public record of copyright claims, shielding federal courts from the burden of unnecessary litigation, potentially preventing and protecting defendants from frivolous lawsuits, and furthering the collections of the Library of Congress. She then argued that the integrity of the judicial process precludes the parties from waiving §411(a) because both parties invoked the jurisdictional bar before District Court to defend the fairness of their settlement, which rewarded the owners with registered copyrights at the expense of owners with unregistered copyrights. Finally, Merritt argued that neither a special rule for settlement nor the supplemental jurisdiction act cured this jurisdictional defect for two reasons: (1) Courts must have jurisdiction over class actions in order to terminate the claims of absent class members and (2) the many authors and databases involved in this lawsuit did not constitute a single case or controversy. The Computer and Communications Industry Association (CCIA) also presented an amicus brief supporting the second circuit's judgement. Similarly to Professor Merritt, the CCIA cast the registration requirement as a necessary protection for Internet service providers, noting that, "[w]hen every blog and tweet might be protectable under copyright, the registration requirement dramatically reduces technology companies’ potential exposure to copyright infringement claims" They argued that the Second Circuit's opinion was correctly decided and that Petitioners' writ of certiorari should be dismissed on two grounds. First, there was no case or controversy before the court because Petitioners themselves argued in lower courts that §411(a) was jurisdictional in nature. Second, circuit courts were in agreement that §411(a) limits federal courts' subject matter jurisdiction; therefore, there was no circuit split, which is the traditional grounds on which the Supreme Court grants certiorari. Thus, the CCIA urged that the Supreme Court dismiss the writ. The court heard oral argument on October 7, 2009.

=== Holding ===
Justice Thomas wrote and delivered the opinion of the Court, joined by Chief Justice Roberts, and Justices Scalia, Kennedy, and Alito joined. Justice Ginsburg filed a concurring opinion, joined by Justices Stevens and Breyer. Justice Sotomayor took no part in the consideration or decision of this case. The majority held that §411(a)'s registration requirement is a precondition to filing a copyright infringement claim. The Court further held that a copyright holder's failure to comply with the registration requirement does not restrict a federal court's subject matter jurisdiction over infringement claims involving unregistered works. The Court declined to address whether Section 411(a)'s registration requirement is a mandatory precondition to suit that district courts may or should enforce on their own initiative by dismissing copyright infringement claims involving unregistered works.

=== Concurring opinion ===
Justice Ruth Bader Ginsburg, joined by Justices John Paul Stevens and Stephen G. Breyer, concurred in part and concurred in the judgment. Justice Ginsburg agreed that Section 411(a)'s registration requirement does not restrict a federal court's subject matter jurisdiction. However, she noted that tension remained between the Court's prior holdings in Arbaugh v. Y & H Corp. and Bowles v. Russell. In an attempt to stave off confusion, she attempted to reconcile the two decisions by distinguishing the cases.
