= Berghuis v. Smith =

- Supreme Court of the United States

Decided March 30, 2010
- Full case name: Berghuis v. Smith
- Citations: 559 U.S. 314 (more)

Holding
- No opinion of the Supreme Court specifies the method or test courts must use to measure racial underrepresentation in a jury pool.

Court membership
- Chief Justice John Roberts Associate Justices John P. Stevens · Antonin Scalia; Anthony Kennedy · Clarence Thomas; Ruth Bader Ginsburg · Stephen Breyer; Samuel Alito · Sonia Sotomayor

Case opinions
- Majority: Ginsburg, joined by unanimous
- Concurrence: Thomas

Berghuis v. Smith, 559 U.S. 314 (2010), was a United States Supreme Court case in which the court held that no opinion of the Supreme Court specifies the method or test courts must use to measure racial underrepresentation in a jury pool.The Court ruled that Michigan's jury selection system, which resulted in low representation of African Americans in Kent County, did not violate the Sixth Amendment, as the statistical disparity did not satisfy the Duren v. Missouri test for underrepresentation.

== Background ==
The Sixth Amendment to the United States Constitution secures to criminal defendants the right to be tried by an impartial jury drawn from sources reflecting a fair cross section of the community. The Supreme Court recognized this right in Taylor v. Louisiana and other decisions, including Duren v. Missouri.

In this case, Diapolis Smith, a Black American, was convicted of second-degree murder by an all-white jury in Kent County, Michigan in 1993. At the time of Smith's trial, Black Americans constituted 7.28% of Kent County's jury-eligible population, and 6% of the pool from which potential jurors were drawn. Smith challenged his confinement in the state courts and took his case to the Michigan Supreme Court, but he was unsuccessful in getting it overturned.

After his state-level challenges failed, Smith challenged his confinement with a federal habeas corpus petition. The Antiterrorism and Effective Death Penalty Act of 1996 (AEDPA) prohibits federal habeas relief unless the state court's adjudication "resulted in a decision that was contrary to, or involved an unreasonable application of, clearly established Federal law, as determined by the Supreme Court of the United States" or "resulted in a decision that was based on an unreasonable determination of the facts in light of the evidence presented in the State court proceeding". Finding no infirmity in the Michigan Supreme Court's decision when assessed under AEDPA's standards, the federal District Court dismissed Smith's petition. The Sixth Circuit reversed.

The Sixth Circuit Court of Appeals held, first, that courts should use the comparative disparity test to measure underrepresentation where, as here, the allegedly excluded group is small. The court then held that Smith's comparative disparity statistics demonstrated that African-Americans' representation in County Circuit Court venires was unfair and unreasonable. It next stated that Smith had shown systematic exclusion. In accord with the Michigan intermediate appellate court, the Sixth Circuit believed that the district-court-first assignment order significantly reduced the number of Black Americans available for Circuit Court venires. Smith was entitled to relief, the Sixth Circuit concluded, because no important state interest supported the district-court-first allocation system.

The case was appealed to the United States Supreme Court, which granted certiorari.

== Opinion of the court ==
The Supreme Court issued an opinion on March 30, 2010.
