= Poulsen =

Poulsen is a Danish patronymic surname meaning "son of Poul" (Danish version of Paul). The form Paulsen is a less common cognate.

People with the name include:

== Sportspeople ==
- Aage Poulsen (1919–1998), Danish long-distance runner
- Anders Poulsen (ice hockey) (born 1991), Danish hockey player
- Andreas Poulsen (born 1999), Danish footballer
- Annette Poulsen (born 1969), Danish swimmer
- Christian Poulsen (born 1980), Danish professional football player
- Christian Poulsen (chess player) (1912–1981), Danish chess master
- Christian Poulsen (cyclist) (born 1979), Danish cyclist
- Christopher Poulsen (born 1981), Danish footballer
- Hanne Høegh Poulsen (born 1981), Danish taekwondo practitioner
- Jakob Poulsen (born 1983), Danish professional football player
- Jan B. Poulsen (born 1946), Danish football manager
- Jonas Kældsø Poulsen (born 1985), Danish windsurfer
- Julie Stokkendal Poulsen (born 2001), Danish professional handballer
- Kaj Poulsen (born 1942), Danish footballer
- Kasper Poulsen, Danish wheelchair curler
- Katja Poulsen (born 1976), Danish archer
- Ken Poulsen (1947–2017), American baseball player
- Kim Poulsen (born 1959), Danish football manager
- Kristian Poulsen (born 1975), Danish racing driver
- Lív Poulsen (born 1997), Danish footballer
- Maria Poulsen (born 1984), Danish curler
- Mette Poulsen (born 1993), Danish badminton player
- Mikkel Poulsen (born 1984), Danish curler
- Olaf Klitgaard Poulsen (1914–2007), Danish rower
- Ole Poulsen (born 1941), Danish sport sailer
- Poul Byrge Poulsen (1915–1994), Danish rower
- René Holten Poulsen (born 1988), Danish sprint canoeist
- Rikke Poulsen (born 1986), Danish handball player
- Roald Poulsen (born 1950), Danish football manager
- Rógvi Poulsen (born 1989), Faroese footballer
- Sandy Poulsen (born 1952), American alpine skier
- Simon Poulsen (born 1984), Danish professional football player
- Svenne Poulsen (born 1980), Danish footballer
- Thomas Poulsen (born 1970), Danish rower
- Willy Poulsen (born 1946), Danish rower
- Yussuf Poulsen (born 1994), Danish footballer

== Other people ==
- Axel Poulsen (1887–1972), Danish sculptor
- Emil Poulsen (1842–1911), Danish actor and stage director
- Erik Poulsen (American politician) (born 1964), American politician
- Erik Poulsen (Danish politician) (born 1967), Danish politician
- Gudrun Poulsen (1918–1999), Danish painter
- Hanna Poulsen (born 1984), Finnish model, Miss Finland 2005
- Hans Poulsen (1945–2023), Australian singer-songwriter
- Henrik Poulsen (disambiguation), multiple people
- Jógvan Poulsen (fl. 1654–1677), Lawman of the Faroe Islands
- Jógvan Poulsen (1854–1941), Faroese politician
- Johan Poulsen (1890–1980), Faroese politician
- Johanne Astrid Poulsen (born 2006), Danish drummer
- Johannes Poulsen (1881–1938), Danish actor and director
- Karen Poulsen (1881–1953), Danish stage and film actress
- Kevin Poulsen (born 1965), American black hat hacker and senior editor at Wired News
- Michael Poulsen (born 1975), lead singer of the Danish rock band Volbeat
- Morten Poulsen (born 1988), Danish hockey player
- Nicolai Poulsen (born 1993), Danish footballer
- Niels Winther Poulsen (1902–1990), Faroese politician
- Olaf Poulsen (1849–1923), Danish actor
- Poul Poulsen Nolsøe (1766–1809), Faroese national hero
- Roy G. Poulsen (1918–2006), American economist
- Sally-Ann Poulsen, Australian chemical biologist
- Sara Poulsen (born 1984), Danish actress
- Søren Pape Poulsen (1971–2024), Danish politician
- Svend Poulsen (c. 1610–c. 1680), Danish military commander
- Tórbjørn Poulsen (1932–2014), Faroese politician
- Troels Lund Poulsen (born 1976), Danish politician
- Ulla Poulsen (1905–2001), Danish ballerina and actress
- Valdemar Poulsen (1869–1942), Danish engineer

== See also ==
- Polson (surname)
- Poulson (surname)
