= Poulson =

Poulson may refer to:

- Poulson (surname)
- Poulson, Virginia
- Poulson (processor), the codename of Intel's Itanium 9500 processor series

== See also ==
- Polson (disambiguation)
- Poulsen, a surname
