= Paulsen (disambiguation) =

Paulsen is a Danish, Norwegian and German patronymic surname.

Paulsen may also refer to:

== Fictional characters ==
- Jed Paulsen, a fictional DC Comics character who became Jed Walker

== Other uses ==
- Paulsen Peak, located on South Georgia, a British territory in the southern Atlantic Ocean
- novels
  - Murphy (Gary Paulsen novel)
  - The River (Paulsen)

== See also ==
- Paulson (disambiguation)
