= Jesper Cornelius =

Danish footballer (born 2001)

Personal information
- Full name: Jesper Cornelius Rasmussen
- Date of birth: 26 June 2001 (age 25)
- Place of birth: Randers, Denmark
- Height: 1.93 m (6 ft 4 in)
- Position: Forward

Team information
- Current team: Start
- Number: 17

Youth career
- 2014–2019: Randers FC

Senior career*
Years	Team	Apps	(Gls)
2019–2021	Randers Freja		
2021–2024	Vorup FB		
2024–2025	Hobro	22	(8)
2025–2026	Lyngby	31	(4)
2026–	Start	17	(4)
- * Club domestic league appearances and goals as of 11:35, 22 August 2026 (UTC)

Jesper Cornelius Rasmussen (born 26 June 2001) is a Danish footballer who plays as a forward for Eliteserien club IK Start.

== Career ==
=== Club career ===
Cornelius is a product of Randers FC, where he played in his youth years. However, he was sorted out at the age of 14, and subsequently made the trip to several different clubs in East Jutland. Cornelius played, among other things, for a period at Randers FC's reserve team, Randers Freja who played in the Jutland Series, before he and his coach, Svenne Poulsen, moved on to Vorup FB, which played in the Denmark Series.

After a strong 2023 fall, where Cornelius was the top scorer in the league with 11 goals in the Denmark Series, the striker went on a trial at Danish 1st Division club Hobro IK in January 2024. On 2 February 2024, Hobro confirmed that Cornelius joined the club on a three-year contract.

After a year in Hobro, where he scored eight goals and one assist, Cornelius made a meteoric rise when he was sold to Danish Superliga club Lyngby Boldklub on 3 February 2025, where he signed a deal until June 2028. He made his debut for Lyngby on 16 February 2025 in a Danish Superliga match against FC Midtjylland, where he was in the starting lineup.

On 12 January 2026, Cornelius was sold to newly promoted Eliteserien club IK Start.
