= Paulsen =

Origin
- Meaning: son of Paul
- Region of origin: Latin

Other names
- Variant forms: Paulson; Poulsen

Paulsen is a Danish, Norwegian and German patronymic surname, from the given name Paul prefix, of Latin origin, itself derived from Paulus, meaning "small". People with the name Paulsen include:

- Albert Paulsen (1925–2004), Ecuadorian-American actor
- Arthur R. Paulsen (1916–2010), American politician
- August Paulsen (1871–1927), Danish American businessman
- Axel Paulsen (1855–1938), Norwegian figure skater
- Bjørn Paulsen (born 1991), Danish footballer
- Dave Paulsen, American basketball coach
- David Paulsen, American television screenwriter and producer
- Diego Paulsen (born 1987), Chilean politician
- Edvin Paulsen (1889–1963), Norwegian gymnast
- Erik Paulsen (born 1965), former US Representative from Minnesota
- Frederik Paulsen Sr (1909–1997), Swedish-German medical doctor and founder of Ferring Pharmaceuticals
- Frederik Paulsen Jr (born 1950), businessman, son of the founder of Ferring Pharmaceuticals
- Fridtjof Paulsen (1895–1988), Norwegian speed skater
- Friedrich Paulsen (1846–1908), German philosopher
- Gary Paulsen (1939–2021), American writer
- Harald Paulsen (1895–1954), German actor
- Harold Paulsen, American collegiate ice hockey player
- Jan Paulsen (born 1935), President of the General Conference of Seventh-day Adventists
- John C. Paulsen, American architect
- Julius Paulsen (1860–1940), Danish painter
- Keith Paulsen, American engineer
- Kraig Paulsen, American State Representative in Iowa
- Leif Otto Paulsen, Norwegian football midfielder
- Lisa Paulsen, American CEO, President of the Entertainment Industry Foundation
- Liv Paulsen (1925–2001), Norwegian sprinter and shot putter
- Logan Paulsen, former American football
- Louis Paulsen (1833–1891), German chess player
- Marianne Paulsen, Norwegian football defender
- Marit Paulsen (1939–2022), Swedish politician
- Nancy Paulsen, publisher of Nancy Paulsen Books at Penguin Group
- Otto A. Paulsen (1875–1957), American politician
- Pat Paulsen (1927–1997), American comedian
- Rob Paulsen (born 1956), American voice actor
- Wilfried Paulsen (1828–1901) German chess master

== See also ==
- Paulson
- Paulsson
- Poulsen
