= Polson =

Polson may refer to:

- Polson, Montana, a city in the United States
  - Polson Airport, the public use airport of Polson, Montana
- Polson (brand), an Indian dairy products brand
- Polson Pier, entertainment venue in Toronto, Canada
- Polson (surname)
- Polson (Indian actor), an Indian actor featured in Upaasna, Tulsi Vivah and Jai Dwarkadheesh

== See also ==
- Poulson (disambiguation)
