= Paulse =

Paulse is a surname. Notable people with the surname include:

- Breyton Paulse (born 1976), South African rugby union player
- Hillroy Paulse (born 1985), South African cricketer
- Nathan Paulse (born 1982), South African soccer player

== See also ==
- Paulsen
