= Paulson (disambiguation) =

Paulson is a patronymic surname.

Paulson may also refer to:

- Paulson Stadium, Statesboro, Georgia, USA
- Paulson (band), band from New Jersey, USA
- Paulson Plan, see Emergency Economic Stabilization Act of 2008
- Paulson, Manitoba, Canada

== See also ==
- Paulsen (disambiguation)
