= Serra Cross =

Landmark on a hill in Ventura, California, US

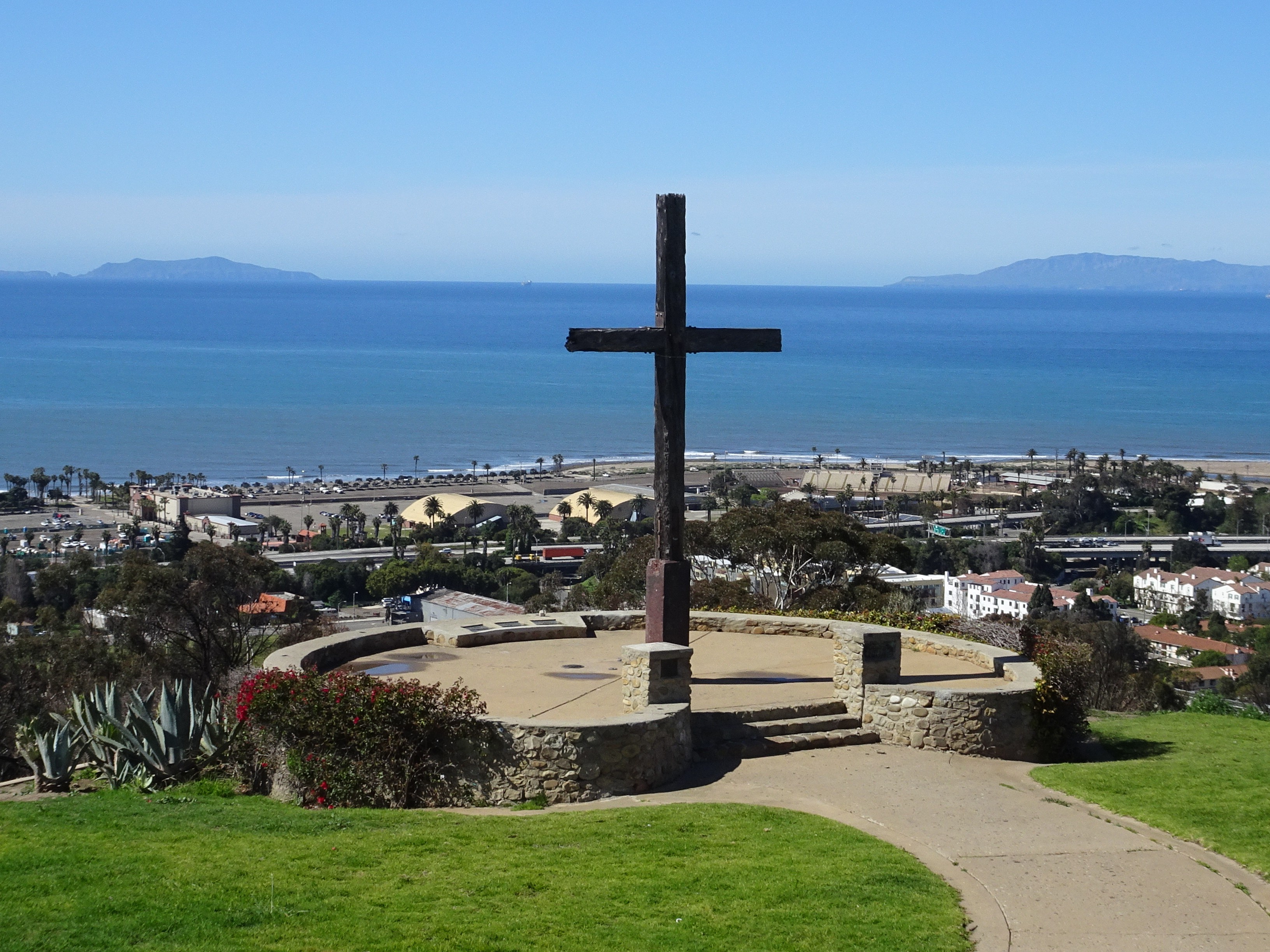
- Serra Cross with Anacapa and Santa Cruz Islands in background, April 2018
- Coordinates: 34.2846°N 119.2962°W
- Area: 1 acre (0.40 ha)
- Built: 1782
- Owner: Serra Cross Conservancy

The Serra Cross, sometimes also known as the Cross on the Hill or the Grant Park Cross, is a Christian cross on a hill known as "La Loma de la Cruz" in Ventura, California. The site is in Serra Cross Park, a one-acre parcel within the larger Grant Park that overlooks downtown Ventura, the Santa Barbara Channel, and Anacapa and Santa Cruz Islands.

According to some accounts, the first cross was erected at the site in 1782 at the time of the founding of the Mission San Buenaventura. The cross has been replaced several times, including known instances in the early 1860s under the supervision of Father John Campala, in 1912 by the E. C. O. Club, and in 1941 by the Alice M. Bartlett Club (successor to the E. C. O. Club). The site was designated as California Historical Landmark No. 113 in 1933; it was also designated in 1974 as City of Ventura Historical Landmark No. 5.

In 2003, the threat of litigation over the city's use of public funds to maintain a religious symbol on city-owned land resulted in a settlement pursuant to which the city agreed to dim the lighting of the cross and sold a one-acre site underlying the cross to a private, non-profit organization that is now known as the Serra Cross Conservancy.

== History ==
=== Construction of the first cross ===
The Mission San Buenaventura was founded by Junípero Serra on March 30, 1782. According to E. M. Sheridan's "History of Cross On Hill", written in 1928, the erection of a cross at a highly visible point was "the first act of the Mission Fathers", seeking to establish a guide-post to those coming to the Mission by land or sea. According to Sheridan's account, Father Serra himself erected and blessed the cross on what was thereafter called "La Loma de la Cruz". According to the traditional story, the cross was erected even before the Mission itself was built.

However, some contend that the story about Father Serra personally erecting the cross in 1782 is not factual. In his 1930 history, "San Buenaventura: The Mission by the Sea", Father Zephyrin Engelhardt rejected the traditional story:

"The first Cross was planted there, so the settlers will say, by Fr. Junipero Serra, the founder of Mission San Buenaventura. However, that is an error. When Fr. Serra started the Mission, he planted and blessed the Cross on the spot where the altar of the church would be located. Such was the rule for all occasions. He was not then in physical condition to climb to the top of the hill, nor is there any record of the raising of the Cross on the mount. Fr. Palou would surely have noted the incident."

Engelhardt was unable to ascertain precisely when the first cross was raised on the hill.

=== Father John Campala's cross ===
The first cross became decayed and collapsed, reportedly in the early 1860s. Shortly thereafter, the cross was rebuilt under the supervision of Father John Campala, also known as Padre Juan, who was then the presiding priest at the Mission San Buenaventura. The second cross collapsed in a windstorm on November 2, 1875. An article published four days later in the Ventura Free Press noted: "Fallen—the wooden cross, which stood on the summit of the hill back of town, after having stood the storms of a decade, succumbed to the elements on Tuesday night and fell. A cross placed on the same spot when the Mission was founded, and the emblem of Christianity has always been replaced whenever it fell."

For more than 35 years after Father John Campala's cross collapsed, no cross was erected at the site. After the 1875 storm, Ventura de Arnaz, then approximately 16 years old, climbed the hill with her father to survey the damage. The girl retrieved the headpiece from the cross, the portion bearing the inscription "INRI", and retained it as a souvenir. Arnaz later donated the headpiece to the Ventura Pioneer Museum, predecessor to The Museum of Ventura County. According to Sheridan's account, the headpiece discovered by Arnaz had been attached to the cross with wooden pegs and was a remnant of the original cross erected by Father Serra in 1782. The headpiece remains "one of the prized possessions" of The Museum of Ventura County.

=== Reconstruction in 1912 ===
In 1912, a movement to rebuild the cross on the hill was led by Myrtle Francis, head of the Landmarks Committee, Sol N. Sheridan, secretary of the Chamber of Commerce, and Alice Bartlett, head of the E. C. O. Club. Sheridan led a party to cut down Jeffrey pine trees in Santa Paula canyon to build the new cross, and R. E. Brakey cut the trees and hauled them back to Ventura. The logs were hewn and cured at the Peoples' Lumber Company under the supervision of Selwyn Shaw, a local builder who also designed the mount for the new cross.

On September 9, 1912, the new cross was erected on the site of Father Serra's original cross. The 26-foot replacement cross was dedicated in a ceremony that included a live band and speeches. The Ventura Free Press described the ceremony at length on its front page and concluded: "Never has the town seen such an outpouring of people. The event was an unusual one for any community. It has never happened before, nor anything just like it, nor, is it likely to happen again within the next hundred years." The ceremony began at the Mission with the ringing of the old Mission bells, including a vesper bell that had been silent for years. A procession up the hill, accompanied by Santa Barbara's St. Aloysius Band, was led by grand marshal, Francisco Camarillo, followed by the Franciscan fathers of Santa Barbara, E. C. O. Club members, Ventura County Pioneers, Native Daughters of the Golden West, city and county officials, and school children from throughout the county "carrying an immense American flag." A large crowd of 3,000 to 4,000 persons gathered at the site of the cross for its dedication. Upon the raising of the cross, the Franciscans blessed it, and children from Oxnard's St. Joseph school sang. Several speeches were given, and an original poem about the cross was read by John S. McGroarty, who was later designated as California'a poet laureate.

In 1915, residents of Ventura began an annual tradition of walking up the hill to the cross for an Easter sunrise service.

In 1919, petitions were circulated seeking construction of a road to the cross through Grant Park.

On April 3, 1932, a crowd of 5,000 persons gathered at the cross to celebrate the 150th anniversary of Father Serra's founding of the mission; after a procession from the Mission, an American flag was presented to the city, mass was celebrated by John Joseph Cantwell (the first archbishop of Los Angeles), choirs sang, an original poem was read by John S. McGroarty, and a speech was given by John G. Mott. Also in 1932, the cross was illuminated for the first time. An article in the Los Angeles Times opined: "The red outline makes a striking image on the hillside."

=== The fourth cross erected in 1941 ===
In 1941, the cross was replaced by the Alice M. Bartlett Club.

In 1966, the cross was placed on a platform and illuminated with fluorescent lighting.

In 1974, the cross site was one of the first six locations named as a City of Ventura Historic Landmark. It was designated as Ventura Historic Landmark No. 5.

== First Amendment litigation ==
At least as early as 1991, concerns were raised about the city's maintenance of a Christian cross on public land. Two other Christian crosses in San Diego County were ordered removed that year (one on Mount Soledad in San Diego, the other on Mount Helix in La Mesa) by a federal judge who ruled that they violated the "no-preference" clause in the California Constitution.

In March 2003, Americans United for Separation of Church and State and three Ventura County residents represented by attorney Vince Chhabria challenged the City of Ventura's use of public funds to maintain a religious symbol on public land. The action was premised on the First Amendment's Establishment Clause and followed lawsuits challenging crosses in San Francisco and La Mesa and Mount Soledad in San Diego County. Ventura's City Attorney Bob Boehm attempted to assert that, more than a religious icon, the Serra Cross was "a time-honored landmark" with a historic character.

The debate over removal of the cross dominated Ventura County newspaper coverage and editorials through the spring and summer of 2003. On May 4, parishioners from 10 churches encircled the cross in a two-hour prayer vigil in support of the cross. On June 8, a group called Bikers for Christ held a Saturday morning rally in front of City Hall to support the maintenance of the cross.

In August 2003, the city, seeking to avoid costly litigation and likely defeat, reached a settlement with the plaintiffs. As part of the settlement, the City agreed to sell the cross and a one-acre parcel beneath it in an auction open to all bidders. The settlement further required the city to cease illuminating the cross at night with fluorescent lighting and imposed a deed restriction that any future lighting was limited to more muted ground lighting. The settlement was approved by the Ventura City Council on a 6-to-1 vote with Councilman Neil Andrews contending that the restrictions on future owners were "capricious" and part of an effort "to strip public life of religion."

Descendants of the Grant family, which had donated the land to the City in 1918, filed suit challenging the city's planned sale of a portion of the property and arguing that the property would revert to the heirs if the sale went forward. That suit was defeated in court.

== The Serra Cross Conservancy ==
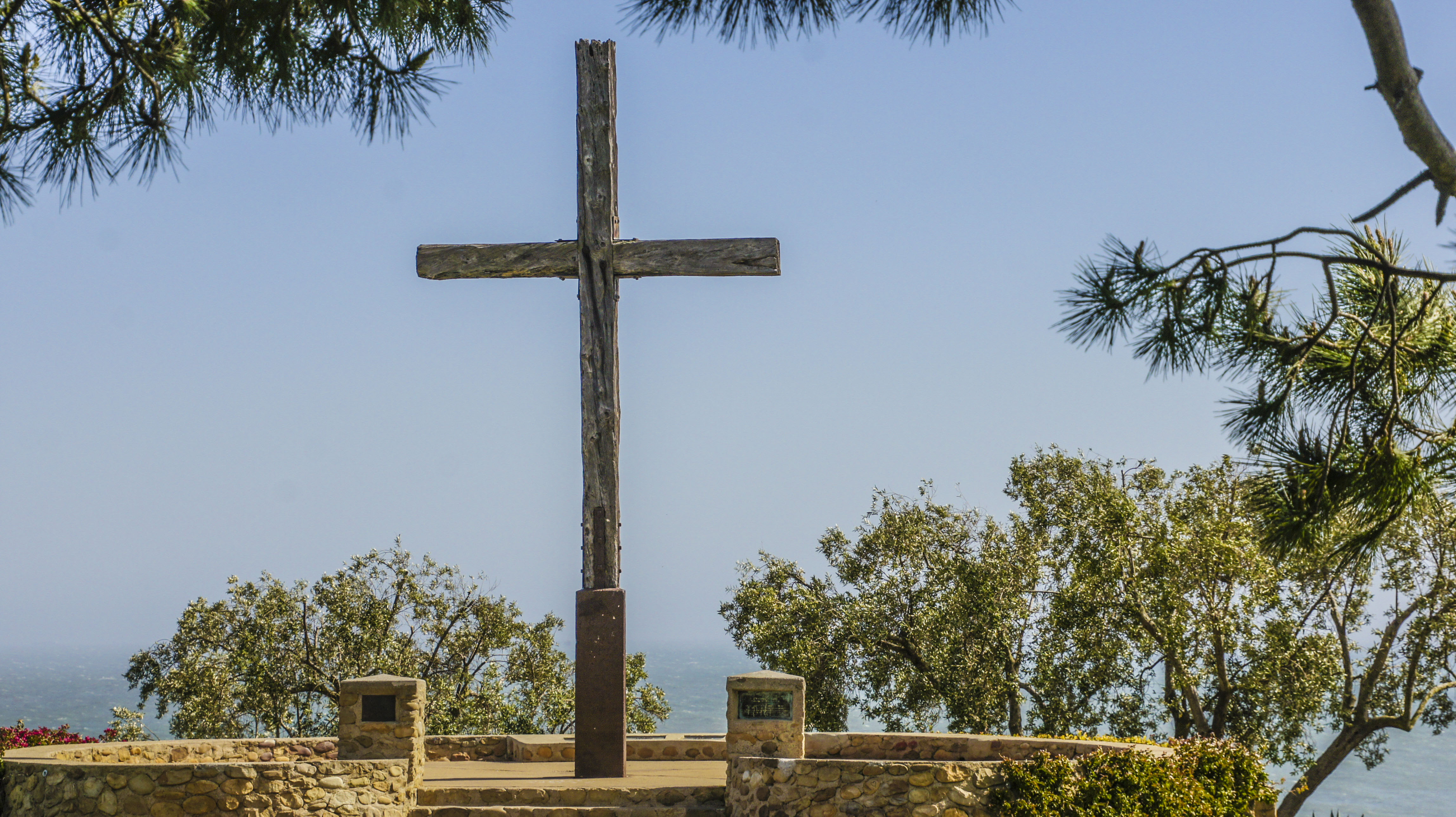
The cross at Serra Cross Park, 2013

In September 2003, a non-profit historic preservation group, San Buenaventura Heritage, purchased the cross and the one-acre site for $104,216.87. The group was the high bidder in an auction that drew four other bidders. At the time of the acquisition, one of the group's leaders, Christie Weir, said the cross would remain, noted that the organization included members of various faiths, and described the cross as a symbol of Ventura's mission heritage.

A new group, Serra Cross Conservancy, was formed, and the property was transferred to it. This group maintains the site as a public park known as Father Serra Park. According to the Conservancy's web site, the group is "interested in preserving and maintaining the Serra Cross Park for a variety of personal reasons; we value the Park for the sake of historic preservation and/or are interested in the cross as a religious icon and a landmark attraction to other communities and tourists. But mostly for long-time members of this community, the cross represents what makes Ventura special and serves as an important element of our lives here in Ventura."

Serra Cross Park is known for its sweeping views of Ventura, the Santa Barbara Channel, and Anacapa and Santa Cruz Islands. The conservancy leases the location for weddings and other events.

In December 2017, rumors that the Serra Cross had been destroyed in the Thomas Fire proved unfounded, though portions of the surrounding park were burned in the fire.

== See also ==
- City of Ventura Historic Landmarks and Districts
- Statues of Junípero Serra (Ventura, California) – erected in front of City Hall
- Mission San Buenaventura
- Mount Davidson (California) § The cross, legal challenges to the Mount Davidson Cross in San Francisco
- Mount Rubidoux § Legal Battle, legal challenge to the cross atop the mountain
- Mount Soledad Cross lawsuits, lengthy legal battle regarding the cross near San Diego, California
- Salazar v. Buono, United States Supreme Court case upholding constitutionality of the Mojave Memorial Cross
