= Mount Davidson (California) =

Highest point in San Francisco, US

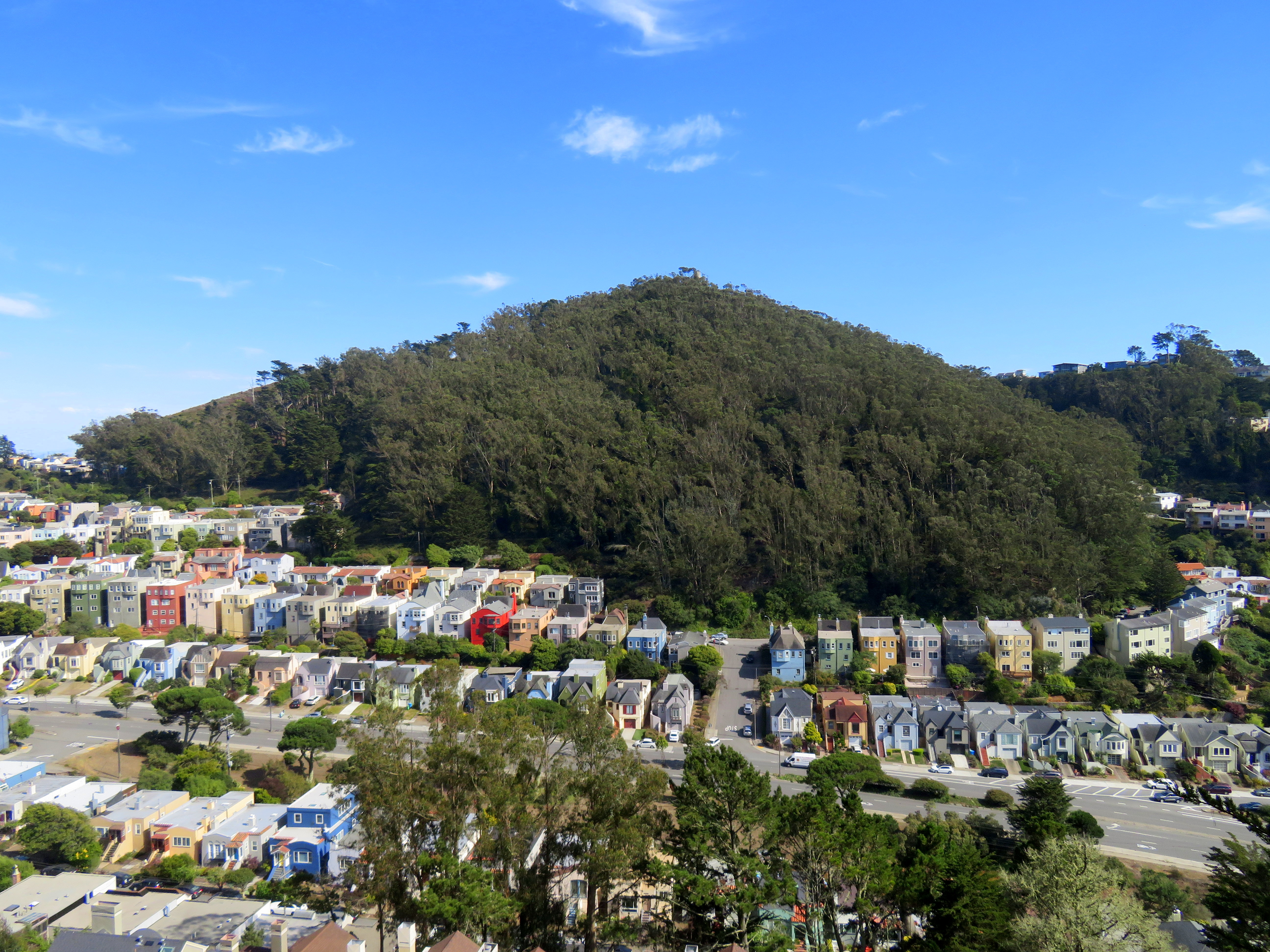
- Mount Davidson as seen from Forest Hill Extension

Highest point
- Elevation: 928 ft (283 m) NAVD 88
- Prominence: 627 ft (191 m)
- Listing: San Francisco Hills; California county high points 57th
- Coordinates: 37°44′18″N 122°27′17″W

Geography
- Location within San Francisco County Location within San Francisco Bay Area Location within California Location within the United States
- Location: San Francisco, California, US
- Topo map: USGS San Francisco South

Climbing
- Easiest route: Hike

Mount Davidson Park
- Interactive map of Mount Davidson Park
- Type: Municipal (San Francisco)
- Location: San Francisco
- Coordinates: 37°44′18″N 122°27′18″W
- Area: 38 acres (15 ha)
- Created: 1920s
- Status: Open all year

Mount Davidson is the highest natural point in San Francisco, California, with an elevation of 928 feet (283 m). Located on the West Side of the city, Mount Davidson sits south of Twin Peaks and Portola Drive and to the west of Diamond Heights and Glen Park. It dominates the southeastern view from most of Portola Drive. It is one of San Francisco's many hills and one of its original "Seven Hills".

Mount Davidson's most notable feature, aside from its height, is the 103-foot (31.4 m) concrete cross situated on the crest of the hill. It is the site of a yearly prayer service, performed on Easter, when the cross is illuminated, and a yearly commemoration of the Armenian genocide, held on April 24.

Mount Davidson Park tops the hill, excluding the land at the summit, which is privately owned. The parkland portion is located between Myra Way (east), Dalewood Way (southwest), and Juanita Way (north). Public transportation is provided by the 36 Teresita Muni line, which stops at the Dalewood Way and Myra Way entrance to the park.

The residential neighborhoods around Mount Davidson Park are Miraloma Park to the east and Westwood Highlands and Sherwood Forest to the southwest.

== History ==
In April 1865 when news of Robert E. Lee's surrender at Appomattox hit the city one patriotic citizen named Matilda Heron sent a messenger to the summit to raise the Stars and Stripes. Adolph Sutro purchased the land in 1881. After his death, the highest of the San Miguel hills was named "Mount Davidson" at the request of, and to honor, charter member George Davidson, of the Sierra Club. The appraiser for Sutro's heirs, A.S. Baldwin, bought the western slope of the mountain in 1911, along with much of the land immediately north and south of Mount Davidson. Baldwin began plans for development of St. Francis Wood, Westwood Park, Westwood Highlands, Forest Hill, Sherwood Forest, and Monterey Heights.

== The cross ==
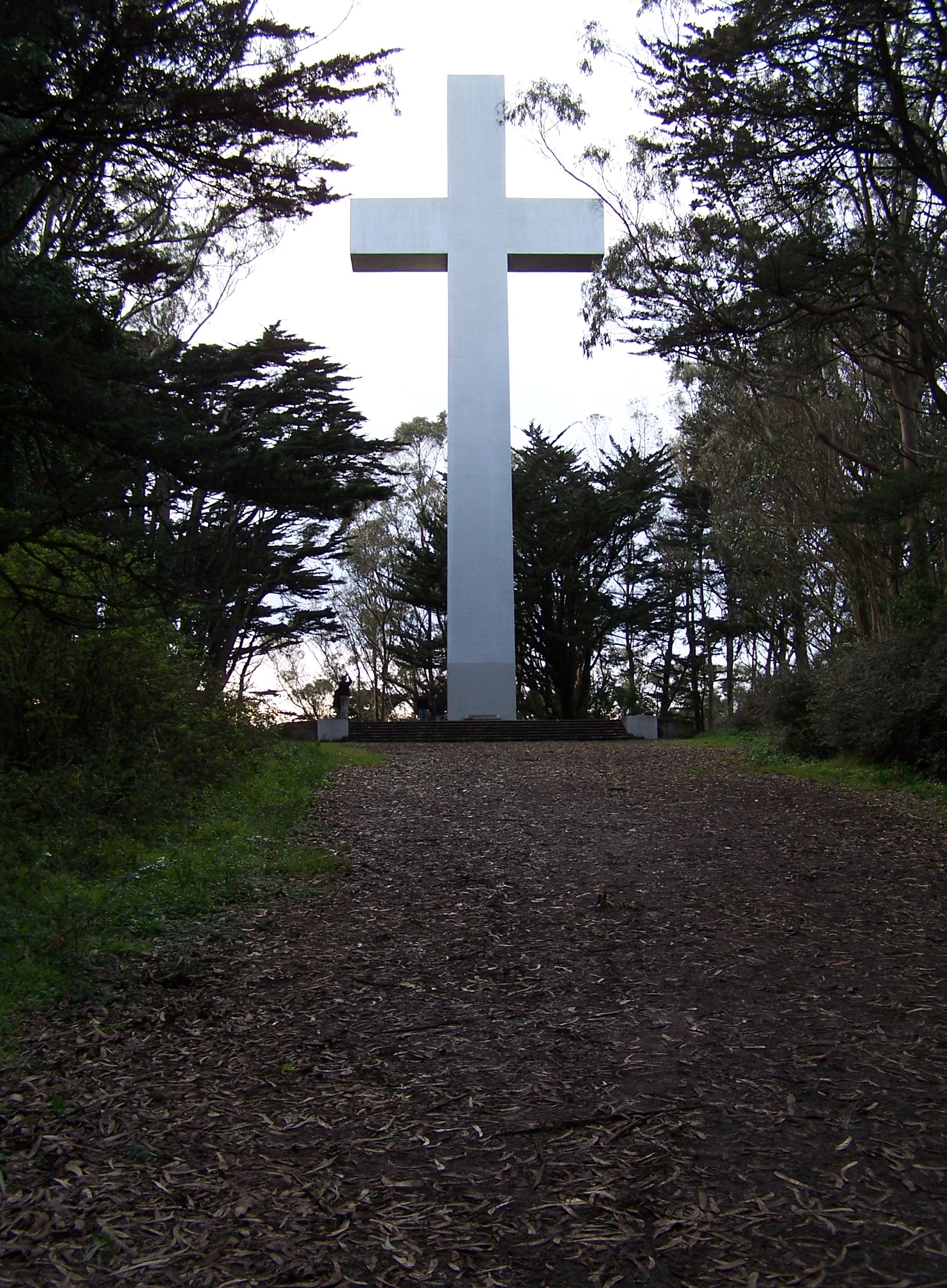
The cross atop Mount Davidson

The first temporary cross was 40 feet (12 m) high, and erected in 1923 for a service led by Dean J. Wilmer Gresham of Grace Cathedral. A second 87-foot (27 m) high cross was built in 1924 and burned down in 1925. In 1926, a nearly 100 feet (30 m) high cross was built and illuminated every night a week before Easter, then burned down in 1928. In 1929 an 80-foot (24 m) high wood and stucco cross with lighting was built. The same year, 20 acres (8.1 ha) at the top of Mount Davidson was purchased by the city of San Francisco for use as a park with funds donated by the Mount Davidson Conservation Committee, led by Mrs. Edmund N. "Madie" Brown. Mrs. A. S. Baldwin donated a further 6 acres (2.4 ha) on the summit to the city at the same time. Arsonists burned down the 1929 cross in 1931.

In 1933 Mayor Angelo Rossi, Governor and former mayor "Sunny Jim" James Rolph, the Easter Sunrise Service Committee, and the Native Sons of the Golden West pledged to construct a permanent cross to commemorate the early California pioneers. The 103-foot (31 m) high concrete and steel cross was completed the next year with President Franklin D. Roosevelt lighting the cross via telegraph from the White House on March 24, 1934 – eight days before Easter. Sunrise services are held at the cross every Easter and were broadcast nationwide by CBS from the 1940s through the 1970s. (According to local gossip columnist Herb Caen, the original plans in 1934 called for a cross 100 feet (30 m) high, but there was "enough concrete on hand for an extra three feet – so on it went.")

Director Don Siegel filmed a scene from the 1971 movie Dirty Harry at the cross. Harry enters the park from Lansdale Avenue, an entry close to the Muni bus stop, before confronting Scorpio at the base of the cross. According to Warner Bros. literature, Siegel was pleased to discover the huge cross at Mount Davidson Park. However, the height of the cross and foggy weather made filming difficult. Every night for a month, cinematographer Bruce Surtees rode a crane to the top of the cross, only to be hampered by foggy weather. When the weather finally cleared, the shot was made in one night. In 1973 the site of the cross was used again in an episode of The Streets of San Francisco in an ending scene reminiscent of the Dirty Harry film, whereby a school bus is hijacked by a Scorpio like serial murderer that crashes it near the foot of the cross.

The cross itself has been the subject of much debate among the residents of San Francisco as they have tried to weigh its religious role against its status as an historic landmark. In 1991 the American Civil Liberties Union, the American Jewish Congress, and Americans United for Separation of Church and State sued the city over its ownership of the cross. After a long legal battle and loss at the Ninth Circuit Court of Appeals, in 1997 the City auctioned 0.38 acres (0.15 ha) of land, including the cross, to the highest bidder. The decision to sell the land was challenged by two members of the group American Atheists, but a federal appeals court ruled against them in 2002 and the Supreme Court declined to hear their case in 2003.

The cross was purchased for $26,000 by The Council of Armenian American Organizations of Northern California which installed a bronze plaque at the base memorializing the victims of the 1915 Armenian genocide. On Armenian Independence Day September 23, 2007, it was discovered that the 160-pound (73 kg) plaque was missing. The original plaque was never found, and a replacement plaque was dedicated at a ceremony on April 20, 2008.

== See also ==
- Dirty Harry (1971), film directed by Don Siegel, featuring a famous scene filmed at the cross
- List of San Francisco, California Hills
- List of highest points in California by county
- Mount Soledad Cross lawsuits, lengthy legal battle regarding the cross located near San Diego, California
- Salazar v. Buono, United States Supreme Court case upholding constitutionality of the Mojave Memorial Cross
- Mount Rubidoux § Legal Battle, legal challenge to the cross atop the mountain
- Serra Cross (Ventura, California), cross on public land in Ventura, California, which was the subject of litigation
