= Mojave Memorial Cross =

War memorial in the Mojave Desert, California

White Cross World War I Memorial
- Veterans of Foreign Wars
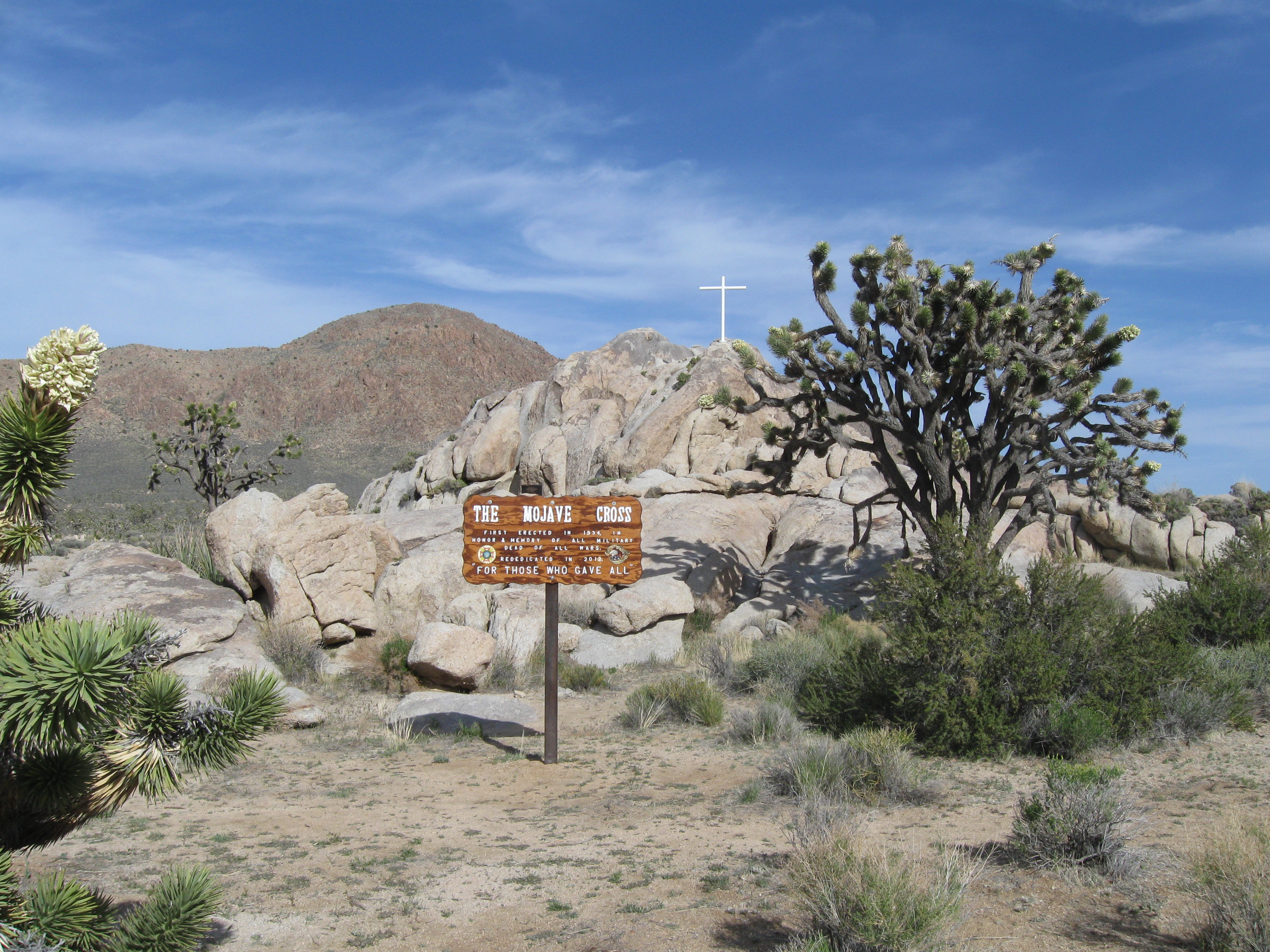
- For the dead of all wars.
- Established: 1934
- Location: 35°18′53.4″N 115°33′1.4″W near Cima, California, U.S.
- Erected in Memory of The Dead Of All Wars

The Mojave Memorial Cross, officially known as the White Cross World War I Memorial, is a cross formerly on public land in the Mojave Desert in San Bernardino County, California that was at the center of the Salazar v. Buono legal case before the U.S. Supreme Court. The original cross was erected in 1934 to honor those killed in war.

The cross stands on Sunrise Rock, a granite outcropping adjacent to Cima Road about 12 miles (19 km) south of Interstate 15, and 6 miles (9.7 km) north of Cima, California; the trailhead leading to Teutonia Peak is on the opposite side of the road, 1,300 feet (400 m) north of the monument. The area is a saddle between Cima Dome and the Ivanpah Mountains, both of which are part of the Mojave National Preserve.

== History ==
The cross was erected in 1934. The caretakers of the spot were introduced to it by a prospector named John Riley Bembry, who served as a medic in World War I and was one of the veterans who established the monument.

The cross has been maintained by volunteers and was reconstructed after being destroyed. It was boarded up in 2002 after lower court rulings declared it illegal because of separation of church and state constitutional concerns.

On April 28, 2010, the US Supreme Court ruled on Salazar v. Buono in a 5–4 decision that sent the case back to a lower court. The high court ruled there was no violation of the separation of church and state when Congress transferred the land surrounding the cross to a veterans group. Writing for the majority, Justice Anthony Kennedy wrote, "The goal of avoiding governmental endorsement [of religion] does not require eradication of all religious symbols in the public realm".

In April 2012, a land exchange to remove Sunrise Rock from the Mojave National Preserve was approved by the U.S. District Court for the Central District of California.

On Veterans Day, November 11, 2012, the cross was rededicated by Henry Sandoz in a ceremony.

In the decades following its erection, the memorial has been periodically interpreted by historians and veterans’ organizations as part of a broader tradition of World War I battlefield and roadside crosses used by American servicemembers to mark graves and memorial sites, particularly in Europe. Such crosses, while religious in origin, were commonly employed in the interwar period as commemorative symbols for fallen soldiers regardless of individual faith, reflecting the cultural norms of the era in which many World War I memorials were established in the United States.

=== Theft ===
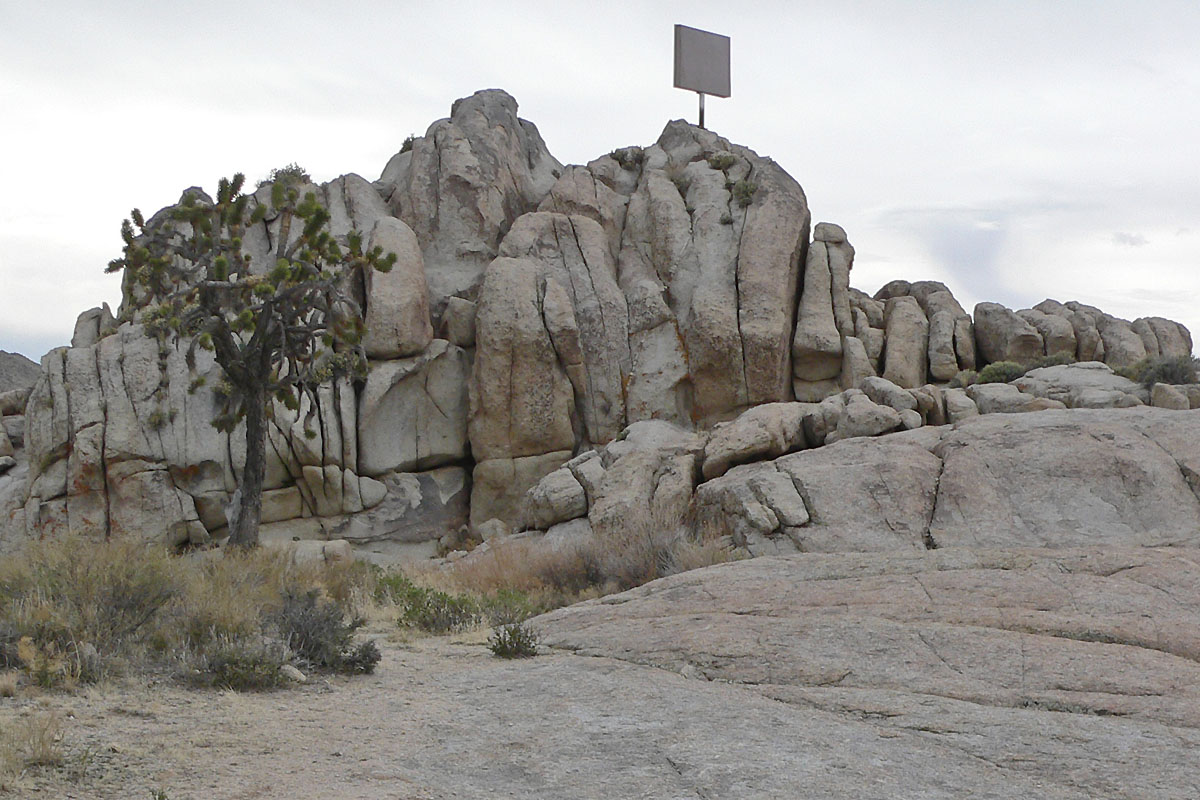
The boarded-up cross in 2006.

On the night of May 9–10, 2010, the cross was cut down and stolen from its place on Sunrise Rock. National Park Service spokeswoman Linda Slater said a $125,000 reward was being offered for information leading to the arrest and conviction of the thieves. The VFW promised that the memorial would be rebuilt. "This was a legal fight that a vandal just made personal to 50 million veterans, military personnel and their families," said National Commander Thomas J. Tradewell.

Slater said that the wooden cover which had covered the cross since 2002 was reported missing on May 8, 2010, and that the cross itself had been seen on May 10 but was reported missing on May 11 by rangers who had returned to the location.

The Desert Dispatch was contacted by someone claiming to have a message from the person who removed the cross. The message claimed that the cross had not been damaged or destroyed but moved by a veteran who objected to the cross being on public land. The message also claimed that a non-sectarian memorial had been brought to the site, but that unspecified technical difficulties prevented it from being put in place of the cross. On June 1, the Liberty Institute publicly offered in the Desert Dispatch to take back and care for the cross at a church in Yucca Valley, but two weeks later, the person who stole the cross had not yet responded. After the theft was reported, an atheist organization, Atheist Alliance International, offered $5,000 to go towards replacing the cross with a more inclusive and non-religious veterans' memorial, but the gesture was ignored by religious groups who insisted that the cross be restored.

On May 20, 2010, park rangers discovered that a replica of the cross stolen 10 days earlier was now bolted to the base of the original. Park personnel removed it and placed it into evidence. Mojave National Park spokesperson, Linda Slater, said that since the replica is not the original disputed cross, it had to come down. "The park service has regulations about people putting up memorials. You can't just go to a park and put up a memorial to a family member."

The cross was found over 500 miles (800 km) away, in Half Moon Bay, California, in early November 2012. The original cross was donated to the Mojave Desert Historical And Cultural Association in 2022, and was erected at the Goffs Schoolhouse Museum in 2024.

== See also ==
- List of national memorials of the United States
- Mount Soledad Cross, a World War I memorial cross that faced a similar legal challenge from atheists
