= Salazar v. Buono =

- Supreme Court of the United States

Argued October 7, 2009 Decided April 28, 2010
- Full case name: Ken L. Salazar, Secretary of the Interior, et al., Petitioners v. Frank Buono
- Docket no.: 08-472
- Citations: 559 U.S. 700 (more) 130 S. Ct. 1803; 176 L. Ed. 2d 634

Case history
- Prior: Permanent injunction granted, Buono v. Norton, 212 F. Supp. 2d 1202 (C.D. Cal. 2002); affirmed, 371 F.3d 543 (9th Cir. 2004); permanent injunction granted prohibiting land swap, 364 F. Supp. 2d 1175 (C.D. Cal. 2005); affirmed sub. nom., Buono v. Kempthorne, 502 F.3d 1069 (9th Cir. 2007); rehearing en banc denied, 527 F.3d 758 (9th Cir. 2008); cert. granted, 555 U.S. 1169 (2009).

Questions presented
- Whether an individual has Article III standing to bring an Establishment Clause suit challenging the display of a religious symbol on government land and if an Act of Congress directing the land be transferred to a private entity is a permissible accommodation.

Court membership
- Chief Justice John Roberts Associate Justices John P. Stevens · Antonin Scalia; Anthony Kennedy · Clarence Thomas; Ruth Bader Ginsburg · Stephen Breyer; Samuel Alito · Sonia Sotomayor

Case opinions
- Plurality: Kennedy, joined by Roberts; Alito (in part)
- Concurrence: Roberts
- Concurrence: Alito (in part)
- Concurrence: Scalia (in judgment), joined by Thomas
- Dissent: Stevens, joined by Ginsburg, Sotomayor
- Dissent: Breyer

Laws applied
- U.S. Const. amend. I

Salazar v. Buono, 559 U.S. 700 (2010), was a decision by the Supreme Court of the United States regarding the Establishment Clause of the First Amendment to the United States Constitution. The case concerned the legality of the Mojave Memorial Cross, a Latin cross which was placed atop a prominent rock outcropping by the Veterans of Foreign Wars foundation in 1934 to honor war dead. The location is known as "Sunrise Rock" in the Mojave National Preserve in San Bernardino County in southeastern California. The Supreme Court ruled that the cross may stay, but also sent the case back to a lower court, making the issue currently unresolved.

== Background ==
=== The cross ===
Currently, there is a cross atop Sunrise Rock that is between 5 and 8 feet (1.5 and 2.4 m) tall and is constructed out of 4-inch-diameter (100 mm) metal pipes painted white. Historical records reflect that a wooden cross was built on that location as early as 1934 by the Veterans of Foreign Wars as a memorial to veterans who died in World War I. Photographs depict the wooden cross and signs near it stating: “The Cross, Erected in Memory of the Dead of All Wars,” and “Erected 1934 by Members of Veterans of Foreign Wars, Joshua Tree post 2884.” The wooden signs are no longer present, and the original wooden cross, which is no longer standing, has been replaced by private parties several times since 1934. The cross has been an intermittent gathering place for Easter religious services since as early as 1935, and regularly since 1984. The current version of the cross was built by Henry Sandoz, a local resident, sometime in 1998. When the National Park Service (NPS) investigated the history of the cross, Sandoz explained that he drilled holes into Sunrise Rock to bolt the cross in place, making it difficult to remove. Sandoz did not receive a permit from NPS to construct the cross. No sign indicates that the cross was or is intended to act as a memorial for war veterans.

=== Action by the National Park Service and Congress ===
In 1999, NPS received a request from an individual seeking to build a stupa (a dome-shaped Buddhist shrine) on a rock outcropping at a trailhead located near the cross. NPS denied that request, citing 36 C.F.R. § 2.62(a) as prohibiting the installation of a memorial without authorization. A handwritten note on the denial letter warned that “[a]ny attempt to erect a stupa will be in violation of Federal Law and subject you to citation and/or arrest.” The letter also indicates that “[c]urrently there is a cross on [a] rock outcrop located on National Park Service lands. . . . It is our intention to have the cross removed.”

In 1999, NPS undertook a study of the history of the cross. NPS determined that neither the cross nor the property on which it is situated qualifies for inclusion in the National Register of Historic Places. Specifically, NPS recognized that the cross itself “has been replaced many times and the plaque that once accompanied it (even though it is not known if it is original) has been removed.” Also, the property does not qualify as an historical site because, among other things, “the site is used for religious purposes as well as commemoration.” Following the announcement by NPS of its intention to remove the cross, the United States Congress passed a series of laws to preserve the Sunrise Rock cross. The first piece of legislation, enacted in December 2000, provided that no government funds could be used to remove the cross.

=== Lawsuit and injunction ===
Frank Buono, a former NPS employee, filed suit in March 2001 against the Secretary of the Department of the Interior, the Regional Director of NPS, and the Superintendent of the Preserve. The district court concluded that the presence of the cross in the Preserve violates the Establishment Clause. In July 2002, the court entered a permanent injunction ordering that the “Defendants, their employees, agents, and those in active concert with Defendants, are hereby permanently restrained and enjoined from permitting display of the Latin cross in the area of Sunrise Rock in the Mojave National Preserve.”

=== Further congressional action ===
In January 2002, while this matter was pending in district court, Congress passed a defense appropriations bill, which included a section designating the Sunrise Rock cross as a “national memorial.”

In October 2002, less than three months after the district court's injunction, in legislation aimed at the Sunrise Rock cross, Congress passed a defense appropriations bill that included a provision barring the use of federal funds “to dismantle national memorials commemorating United States participation in World War I.”

In September 2003 Congress enacted another defense appropriations bill that included a land exchange agreement regarding the Sunrise Rock cross in which an acre of land containing the cross was conveyed to the Veterans Home of California— Barstow, Veterans of Foreign Wars Post #385E in consideration for 5 acres (2.0 ha) of land. The government retained a reversionary interest in the property subject to a condition that the recipient maintain the conveyed property as a memorial commemorating United States participation in World War I and honoring the American veterans of that war.

=== Ninth Circuit Court of Appeals decisions ===
In June 2004, the Court of Appeals for the Ninth Circuit affirmed the district court's permanent injunction, holding that the presence of the cross in the Preserve violates the Establishment Clause. Despite the injunction against display of the cross in the Preserve, the government began moving forward with the mechanics of the land exchange under § 8121. Buono moved to enforce the district court's prior injunction, or modify it to prohibit the land exchange as a violation of the Establishment Clause. In April 2005, the district court granted Buono's motion to enforce the injunction, and denied as moot the request to amend the permanent injunction. According to the district court, “the transfer of the Preserve land containing the Latin Cross which as [a] sectarian war memorial carries an inherently religious message and creates an appearance of honoring only those servicemen of that particular religion is an attempt by the government to evade the permanent injunction enjoining the display of the Latin Cross atop Sunrise Rock.” The district court deemed the exchange “invalid” and permanently enjoined the government “from implementing the provisions of Section 8121 of Public Law 108-87” and ordered the government “to comply forthwith with the judgment and permanent injunction entered by th[e] court on July 24, 2002.” The Ninth Circuit Court of Appeals affirmed. The United States Supreme Court then granted the government's petition for a writ of certiorari.

=== United States Supreme Court ruling ===
On April 28, 2010, the United States Supreme Court ruled 5-4 that the cross may stay but also sent the case back to a lower court. Writing for the plurality of the court, Justice Anthony Kennedy wrote, "The goal of avoiding governmental endorsement [of religion] does not require eradication of all religious symbols in the public realm".

=== Aftermath ===
Only eleven days after the Supreme Court decision, the cross was stolen during the overnight of May 9–10, 2010; a National Park Service official suggested the theft of the cross may have been the work of scrap metal scavengers or people "with an interest in the case", but no arrests have been made to date (as the cross was filled with concrete, it would have been worthless for resale). National Park Service spokeswoman Linda Slater said a $25,000 reward has been offered for information leading to the arrest and conviction of the thieves; the reward was later increased to $100,000. The VFW promised that the memorial will be rebuilt. "This was a legal fight that a vandal just made personal to 50 million veterans, military personnel and their families," National Commander Thomas J. Tradewell said. On May 20, a replica cross was discovered to have been erected in place of the original. Park officials said it was erected overnight, but because of the court ruling park employees would have to remove the replica. Another lawsuit was filed to expedite the land transfer.

In April 2012, a land exchange to remove Sunrise Rock from the Mojave National Preserve was approved by the U.S. District Court for the Central District of California.

== See also ==
- Mount Soledad Cross lawsuits, lengthy legal battle also related to the First Amendment regarding the cross located near San Diego, California
- Mount Davidson (California) § The cross, legal challenges to the Mount Davidson Cross in San Francisco
- Mount Rubidoux § Legal Battle, legal challenge to the cross atop the mountain
- Serra Cross (Ventura, California), cross on public land in Ventura, California, which was the subject of litigation
