= Mount Soledad Cross =

Landmark in La Jolla, San Diego, California, U.S.

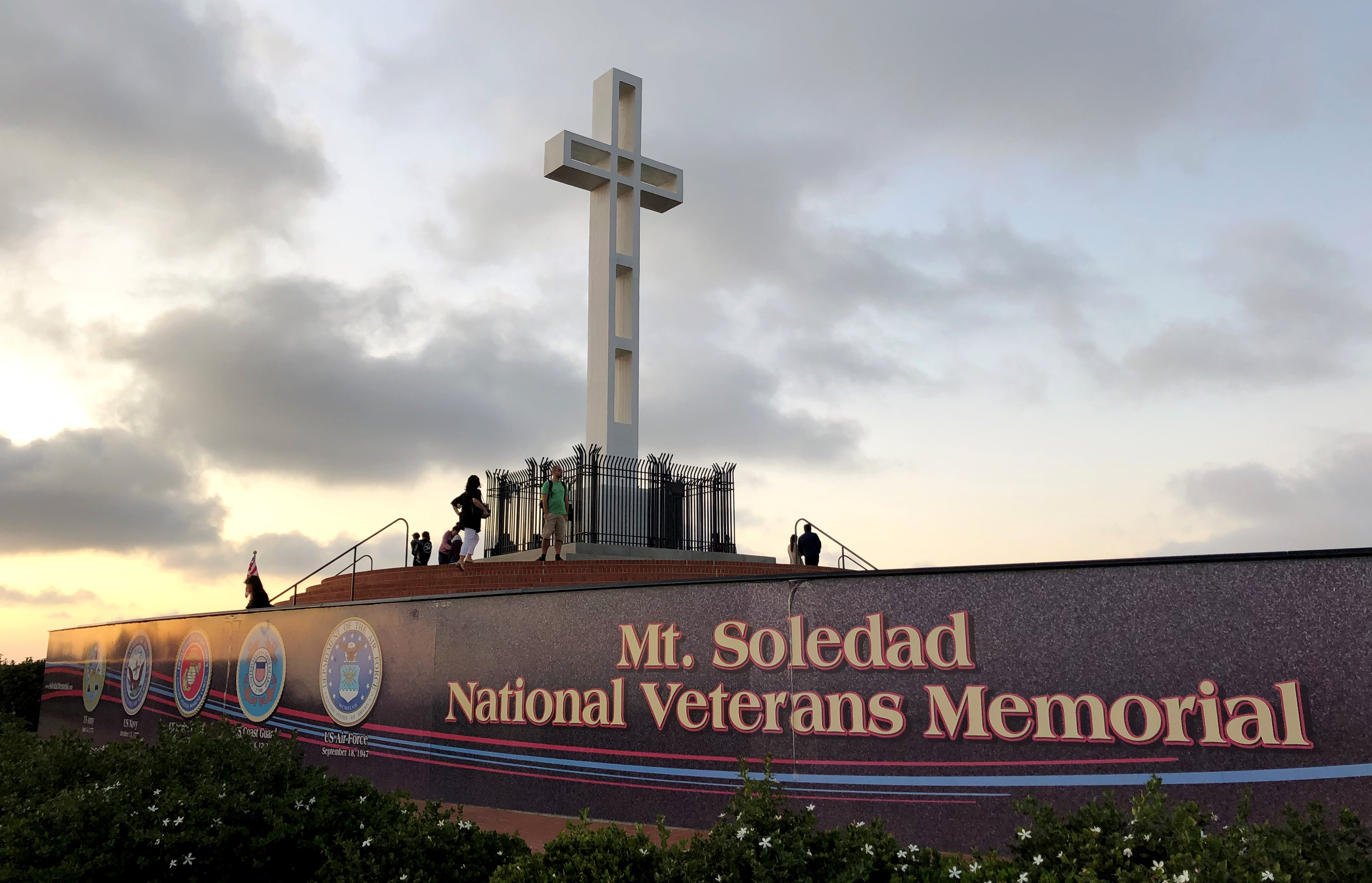
- Mount Soledad Cross at dusk in 2019
- Year: 1954
- Dimensions: 1,300 cm (43 feet)
- Location: Mt. Soledad National Veterans Memorial, San Diego; 32°50′23.4″N 117°14′40.9″W

The Mount Soledad Cross (formerly the Mount Soledad Easter Cross) is a prominent landmark located on top of Mount Soledad in the La Jolla neighborhood of San Diego, California. The present structure was erected in 1954; it is the third Christian cross in that location, the first having been put up in 1913. Architect Donald Campbell designed the present cross in prestressed concrete. It is 29 feet (8.8 m) tall (43 feet [13 m] including the base) with a 12-foot (3.7 m) arm spread. It is the centerpiece of the Mt. Soledad National Veterans Memorial.

Beginning in 1989, almost 10 years before the immediate area around the cross was turned into a war memorial, until 2015, the Mount Soledad Cross was involved in continuous litigation regarding its legal status. The cross's opponents won court decisions showing that it is illegal to display a religious symbol, such as a Christian cross, on public land, as it demonstrates preference to a specific religion and thus violates the principle of separation of church and state under the First Amendment of the U.S. Constitution and the No Preference Clause of the California Constitution. Judges sided with plaintiffs on multiple occasions and ruled that the cross is illegal and had to be removed or sold to the highest bidder. Defenders of the cross explored several options for preserving the cross.

In 1998, the City of San Diego sold the cross and the land it stands on to the nonprofit Mount Soledad Memorial Association, and the cross was transformed into being the centerpiece of a newly erected Korean War Memorial. The land under the cross was eventually transferred to the federal government. In 2011, a federal appeals court found the cross unconstitutional, and in 2012 the Supreme Court declined to hear an appeal, returning the issue to federal court. In December 2013, a federal judge ordered the cross to be removed, but stayed the order pending appeal. In June 2014, the Supreme Court declined to review a case concerning the cross as the previous appeal had not been heard. In December 2014, Congress passed and President Barack Obama signed the National Defense Authorization Act for Fiscal Year 2015, which included a provision that "authorizes the Secretary of Defense to convey (the cross) to the Mount Soledad Veterans Memorial Association, subject to certain conditions." On July 20, 2015, the Mt. Soledad Memorial Association bought the land under the cross from the Dept. of Defense for $1.4 million, ending its unconstitutionality.

== History ==
Three differently shaped Christian crosses have been constructed since 1913 on city government property at the apex of Mt. Soledad (Mt. Soledad Natural Park) in the community of La Jolla. The original wooden cross on Mt. Soledad was erected in 1913 by private citizens living in La Jolla and Pacific Beach, but was stolen in 1923; later that year it was affixed back in the ground in Mt. Soledad Natural Park and later burned. The second cross was erected in 1934 by a private group of Protestant Christians from La Jolla and Pacific Beach. This sturdier, stucco-over-wood frame cross was blown down by blustery winds in 1952. A windstorm damaged one of the side bars in 1955 and the concrete structure had to be repaired.

The present cross, 29 feet (9 m) tall on top of a 14-foot (4 m)-tall stepped platform, was installed in 1954. It was initially called the "Mount Soledad Easter Cross" and Easter services were held there annually for 40 years. The word "Easter" was dropped in the 1980s.

The site is known as the Mt. Soledad National Veterans Memorial. Besides the cross, the memorial includes six walls with granite plaques depicting veterans, military units, or groups.

== Summary of key legal issues ==
Whether the Mt. Soledad Easter Cross is a war memorial or an unmistakable symbol of the Christian religion has been a subject of legal debate for the following reasons:

- After the dedication of the cross in 1954 Easter services were held at the site annually and annual publication of local maps from 1954 to 1989 presented a geographic legal description of the location as the "Mt. Soledad Easter Cross" which after 1989 the name of the location on the map was changed to the "Mt. Soledad Memorial." –
- There was no placard or marker to be found anywhere on Mt. Soledad Natural Park nor at the site of the Mt. Soledad Easter Cross to indicate that it was a veterans' memorial until litigation started in 1989,^{p. 212}(See picture below of the Plaque at the base of the cross).
- Easter holiday sunrise since 1954 was an "intermittent" occasion at the Mt. Soledad Cross for local Christian worship services.^{p. 35} The attendance of the service was estimated at 1,300 in 1983 and 900-1,000 in 1984. By the mid-1980s, to blunt possible legal challenges, Easter sunrise gatherings at the site of the cross were being advertised as "celebrations" rather than "services", were interdenominational and open to the public. On Easter Sunday, April 7, 1996, University of California-San Diego Political Science Professor (Emeritus) Peter Irons applied for and was granted a permit and conducted a well-attended secular sunrise rally for people of all religions and for those with no religion. There is no record of a Jewish, Muslim, Hindu, Buddhist or any other major religious sect or denomination having a religious service on Mt. Soledad.
- The Mt. Soledad Easter Cross was dedicated to "Our Lord and Savior Jesus Christ" in a dedication bulletin by the grandmother of William J. Kellogg, President of the Mt. Soledad Memorial Association on Easter Sunday, 1954. – [Paulson v. City of San Diego, 262 F.3d 885 (9th Cir. 2001), Documents on file with the US District Court of Southern California]
- The Mt. Soledad Memorial Association made improvements to the property within Mt. Soledad Natural Park. All improvements were added after the original case was filed and while litigation proceedings were taking place "Six concentric walls hold 3,200 black granite plaques purchased by donors and engraved with the names and photos of war veterans – currently more than 1,700 are in place."
- The Mount Soledad Memorial Association says the purpose of the Veterans Memorial at Mt. Soledad Park is to commemorate and memorialize all those who died during the Korean War era.
- Plaintiff Philip Paulson (Paulson v. City of San Diego) claimed that the Mt. Soledad Cross fosters an excessive entanglement by government with religion. In 1916 by Ordinance No. 6670, the Mt. Soledad Natural Park became dedicated city owned parkland. Paulson and others argue that the City can only honor veterans with an inclusive memorial that is "religiously neutral" to honor veterans of all faiths, and also those with no religious faith. [The "Lemon Test" pursuant to US Supreme Court ruling in Lemon v. Kurtzman, 403 U.S. 602 (1971) required government to remain "religiously neutral" with respect to religion. To be constitutional, a statute must have "a secular legislative purpose," it must have principal effects which neither advance nor inhibit religion, and it must not foster "an excessive government entanglement with religion."]

The American Civil Liberties Union proposed ways to resolve the situation:

- The cross may be dismantled.
- The cross may be sold to a third party and physically transferred off the public land. A Presbyterian church, located within a few hundred feet from the present location of the cross, has agreed to place it on its property.
- The government may hold an auction and sell the parcel of the land with the cross to the highest bidder. However, the government is not allowed to give any preference to those buyers who are interested in preserving the cross. An auction such as this was the subject of Proposition K in 2004, which failed 40% to 59%.

Some defenders of the cross see all these options as unacceptable and are determined to find a way to leave the cross intact in its present location.

== Litigation ==
=== Background ===
==== No Preference Clause ====
Article 1, Section 4 of the California State Constitution: subtitled "Liberty of Conscience." California state, municipal and special units of government are instructed by this "No Preference Clause" from discriminating or preferring one religion over another.

"Free exercise and enjoyment of religion without discrimination or preference are guaranteed. This liberty of conscience does not excuse acts that are licentious or inconsistent with the peace or safety of the State. The Legislature shall make no law respecting an establishment of religion. A person is not incompetent to be a witness or juror because of his or her opinions on religious beliefs."

==== Government prohibition from benefiting religion ====
Article XVI, section 5 of the California State Constitution: State, County and local units of government can not use tax money or grant property to aid of any religious sect, church, creed, or sectarian purpose.

"Neither the Legislature, nor any county, city and county, township, school district, or other municipal corporation, shall ever make an appropriation, or pay from any public fund whatever, or grant anything to or in aid of any religious sect, church, creed, or sectarian purpose, or help to support or sustain any school, college, university, hospital, or other institution controlled by any religious creed, church, or sectarian denomination whatever; nor shall any grant or donation of personal property or real estate ever be made by the State, or any city, city and county, town, or other municipal corporation for any religious creed, church, or sectarian purpose whatever; provided, that nothing in this section shall prevent the Legislature granting aid pursuant to Section 3 of Article XVI."'

=== First attempted sale to Mount Soledad Memorial Association ===
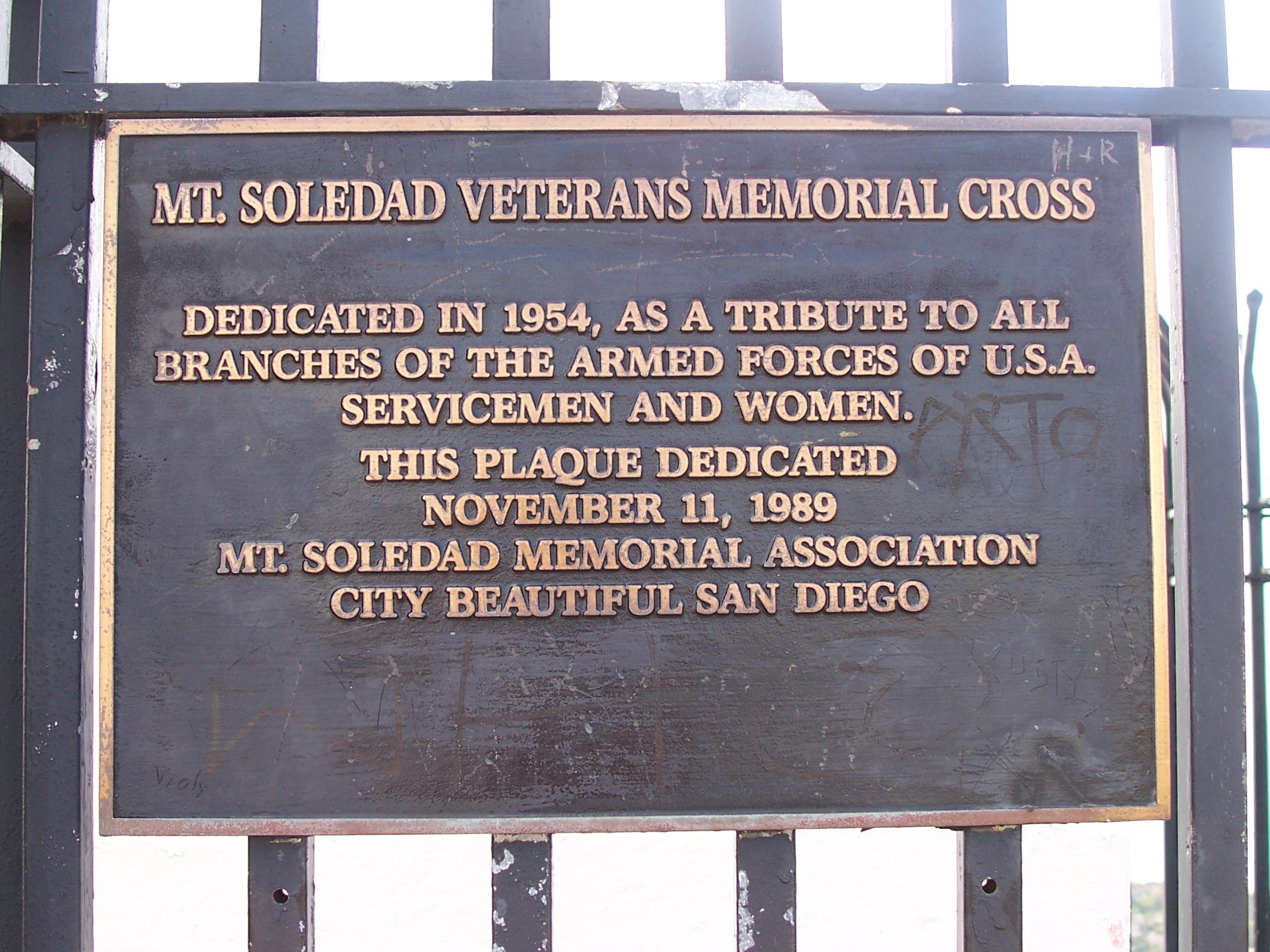
Plaque at the base of the cross

The City of San Diego was the target of a lawsuit on May 31, 1989 charging that the presence of the cross violated the California Constitution and the first amendment of the United States Constitution relating to separation of church and state in the United States. On December 3, 1991, Gordon Thompson, Jr., a judge for the United States District Court for the Southern District of California, ruled in favor of the plaintiff, Philip K. Paulson, resident of San Diego and a Vietnam War veteran, noting that the cross was permanently positioned inside a public park and was maintained at taxpayers' expense. He further noted that it violated Article 1, Section 4 of the California Constitution, which is known as the "No Preference" Clause.

During this first phase of the case, the plaintiffs were represented pro bono by lawyer and legal scholar Peter Irons. He discontinued his involvement in the case in 1998 when threats made him fear for the safety of his two daughters.

On June 2, 1992, San Diego voters approved Proposition F, which allowed transfer of the 22 feet of Mt. Soledad Natural Park under the cross to a non-profit corporation for maintenance of a historic war memorial. ^{p. 185} In 1993, the city appealed the 1991 District Court decision (permanent injunction forbidding the permanent presence of the cross on publicly owned land) to the Ninth Circuit Court of Appeals, which upheld the District Court injunction, holding that the mere designation of the cross as a war memorial was not enough to satisfy the separationist No Preference Clause of the California Constitution. The Ninth Circuit Appellate Court held that "highly visible, religiously significant Easter crosses, erected in public parks owned and maintained by local government, in the absence of any symbols of other religions, and without any independent historical significance, violated the 'No Preference' Clause of the California Constitution". The City and County of San Diego petitioned and were granted a hearing en banc (a vote by the entire 28 judges of the court). They lost by a unanimous vote by all 28 judges.

In response to the injunction, in 1994, the city sold 224 square feet (21 m^{2}) of land at the base of the cross for $24,000 to the Mount Soledad Association. At that time, the city did not solicit or consider any bids or offers from other prospective buyers of this land and the Association clearly stated its intention to keep the cross as part of its proposed war memorial. ^{p. 185}

On September 18, 1997, Judge Thompson ruled that both the negotiated sale of the cross site to the Mount Soledad Memorial Association and the size for the plot sold to the Mount Soledad Memorial Association violated two separate provisions of the California Constitution. Judge Thompson wrote, "it is the exclusion of any other purchasers of or bidders for the land that gives the appearance of preferring the Christian religion that the California Constitution forbids." Judge Thompson also wrote that "the City's attempt to comply with this Court's order by selling only a small portion of the land underneath the Mount Soledad cross still shows a preference or aid to the Christian religion." Judge Thompson added, "Both the method of sale and the amount of land sold underneath the Mount Soledad cross do not cure the constitutional infirmities outlined in this Court's previous Order." (referring to the December 3, 1991 order stating "a permanent injunction forbidding the permanent presence" of the Mount Soledad cross on public property. Judge Thompson again gave the City of San Diego another 30 days to remove the cross).

=== Second attempted sale to Mount Soledad Memorial Association ===
The City attempted to sell the land to a private group again in 1998. Five bids were submitted; the bid from the Mount Soledad Memorial Association (the highest) was accepted and a half-acre of land around the cross was sold to the Association for $106,000. In a decision issued on February 3, 2000, Judge Thompson upheld the transfer. However, in a 7–4 decision, the appellate court Ninth Circuit Court of Appeals found that the City's sale of the cross to the Mount Soledad Memorial Association violated Article XVI, section 5, of the California Constitution, which prohibits government from affording any financial advantage or subsidy to religion.

The City and the Mount Soledad Memorial Association petitioned the Court for reconsideration and/or rehearing, which was denied on October 22, 2002. The City thereafter sought review of the en banc decision by the United States Supreme Court. On April 21, 2003, the Supreme Court denied defendants' petitions for review.

Plaintiff Paulson and defendant Mount Soledad Memorial Association agreed to a settlement that called for removal of the cross in exchange for which the Association would gain ownership of the property. The other defendant, the City of San Diego, never agreed to the settlement. While the cross and land were apparently owned by the Association (after the 1998 sale), the Association spent over $900,000 to add significant improvements to the memorial site, including six concentric granite wall, pavers, bollards, and a flagpole with American flag. Additionally, the Association sold over 1,600 plaques memorializing individual service men and women. The original, unadorned cross eventually became encircled by several walls of plaques.

On July 27, 2004, the City Council took up the motion by Councilmember Scott Peters: "Should voters reject the proposal (Proposition K), City Attorney shall enter into the settlement agreement now with Mt. Soledad Memorial Association and Plaintiffs." The City Council passed the Peters Resolution.

In November 2004, voters rejected Proposition K, a ballot measure to authorize a third sale of a portion of Mount Soledad to the highest bidder. Thus, pursuant to the Peters Agreement the City of San Diego was obligated under the Council Resolution to remove the cross from the Mt. Soledad Natural Park.

=== Attempted donation to Interior Department ===
==== Ballot measure ====
On December 8, 2004, Section 116 of Public Law 108-447 designated the Memorial as a national memorial to veterans, authorized the United States Department of the Interior to accept a donation of the memorial from the City, and directed the National Park Service to work with the Mount Soledad Memorial Association in the administration and maintenance of the memorial. This veterans memorial designation was added by Congressmen Randy "Duke" Cunningham (R) and Duncan Hunter (R), both of whom represented portions of San Diego County, as a rider to a voluminous spending bill approved in November 2004 by the United States Congress. Under the bill, the site would become part of the National Park Service but would be maintained by the Mount Soledad Memorial Association.

On March 8, 2005 the San Diego City Council voted against a proposal to transfer the land to the National Park Service, a move which proponents believed might avoid the court-ordered removal of the cross. Opponents claimed this would merely shift the church-state issue to federal jurisdiction and would only delay the eventual removal of the cross. The City Council declined the offer of the Federal Government to accept the transfer of the Mt. Soledad Memorial property. (Council Motion Passes: 5 Yeas, 3 Nays, 1 Absent)

Opposition to the City Council's action resulted in a referendary petition, signed by over 100,000 County of San Diego residents, calling on the Council to reverse its decision against donating the property. On May 16, 2005, the Council reconsidered its decision to transfer the land at the request of those petitioners, and, after rejecting a proposal to directly donate the land to the Federal government in a 5–4 vote, the Council voted 6–3 to include a ballot measure in the upcoming special Mayoral election to be held July 26 which would allow the voters of San Diego to approve the donation (ballot item (PDF)).

On July 26, 2005, the ballot measure to transfer the property to the Interior Department as a veterans memorial received votes exceeding the two-thirds threshold required to pass. Voters passed Prop A: "Shall the City of San Diego donate to the federal government all of the City's rights, title, and interest in the Mt. Soledad Veterans Memorial property for the federal government's use of the property as a national memorial honoring veterans of the United States Armed Forces?" with 197,125 or 75.96% Yes votes and 62,373 or 24.04% No votes.

==== Ballot measure challenged in court ====
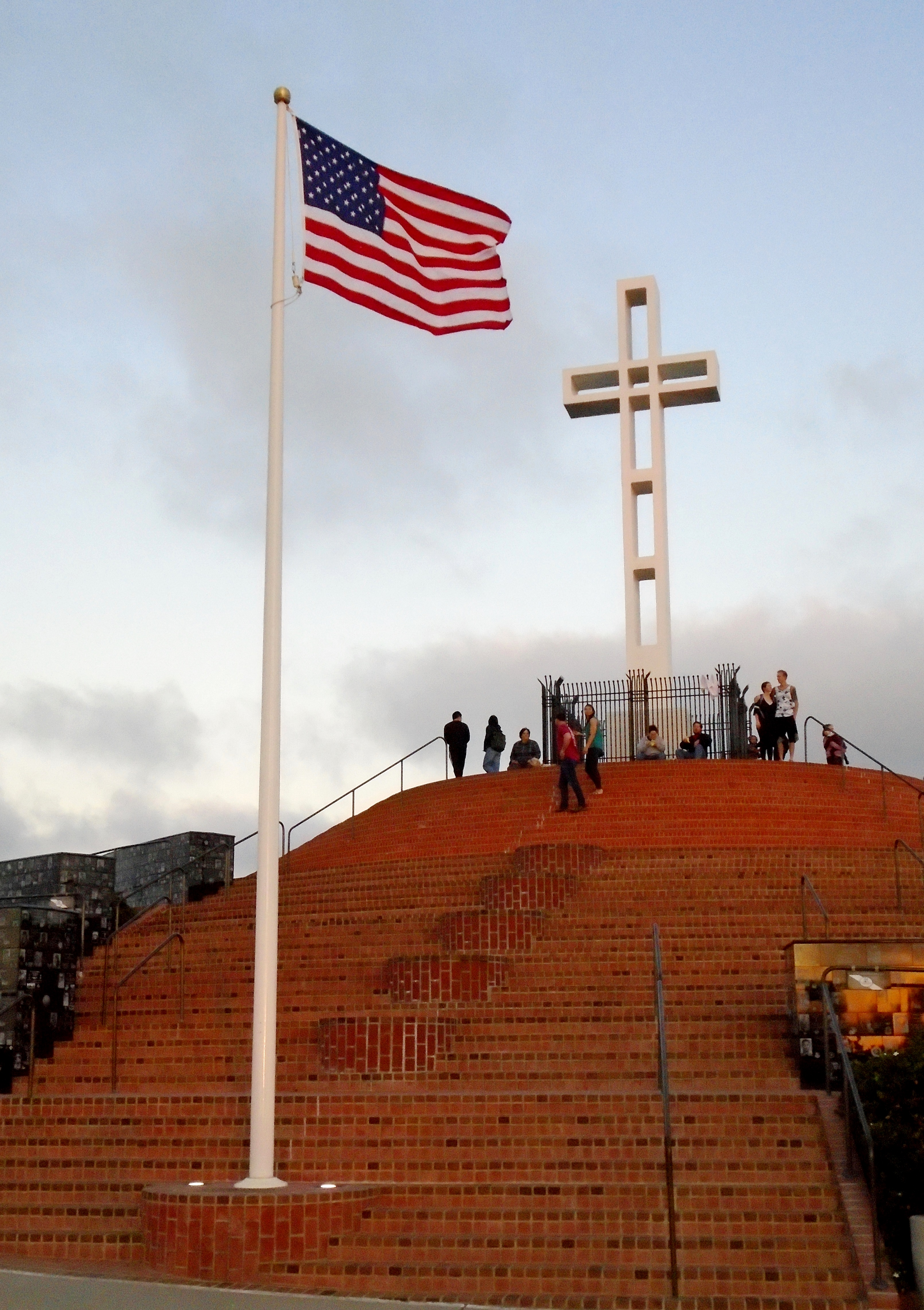
The American flag and the cross in 2019

However, the plaintiff in the federal court case filed a case in California Superior Court challenging the constitutionality of the proposition. On September 3, Superior Court Judge Patricia Yim Cowett issued a temporary restraining order barring the transfer until the issue was settled. Lawyers on each side presented their arguments on October 3, 2005. A key issue was the status of the area as a secular war memorial, given the fact that it was not developed as a memorial until ten years after the first lawsuit. Prior to the lawsuit, no plaque or marker designated or explained the site's status as a war memorial, and during the fifty years prior to the lawsuit, there were no ceremonies or recognitions of the Korean War or to war veterans at the site, only Easter Sunday services. A 1985 map of the San Diego area identifies the cross as the Mt. Soledad Easter Cross. A court document also refers to several references of the Easter Cross including, "...the U.S. Department of Commerce Coast and Geodetic Survey (indicating "Easter Cross" on chart)."

The plaintiff argued that the ballot measure was unconstitutional because it resulted in an unconstitutional act—transferring the property to the federal government for the purpose of keeping the cross in its present location on public parkland, a purely religious symbol of one faith. The City argued that the purpose of the ballot measure was to determine the will of the people of San Diego with respect to the federal government's offer to accept a donation of the property. The private citizens' group which had sponsored the petition leading to ballot measure argued that display of the cross was not unconstitutional because the many significant improvements added to it removed any doubt that it is a genuine veterans memorial.

On October 7, 2005, Judge Cowett found the ballot measure unconstitutional. Her ruling stated: "Maintenance of this Latin Cross as it is on the property in question is found to be an unconstitutional preference of religion in violation of Article I, Section 4, of the California Constitution, and the transfer of the memorial with the cross as its centerpiece to the federal government to save the cross as it is, where it is, is an unconstitutional aid to religion in violation of Article XVI, Section 5, of the California Constitution."

Litigation was now occurring in both the state and federal courts, while legislation was also debated in the San Diego City Council. Congressional action made previous suits and decisions irrelevant by a law to transfer the memorial from city to federal ownership in 2006, moving the issue to federal court beginning with the decision on July 31, 2008 by U.S. Federal Judge Larry Alan Burns ruling that both the transfer and the cross were constitutional. This was reversed by the Ninth Circuit Court of Appeals, in a decision that endorsed the transfer but ruled the sole Latin Cross unconstitutional. The appeal of this decision was denied certiorari by the Supreme Court on June 25, 2012.

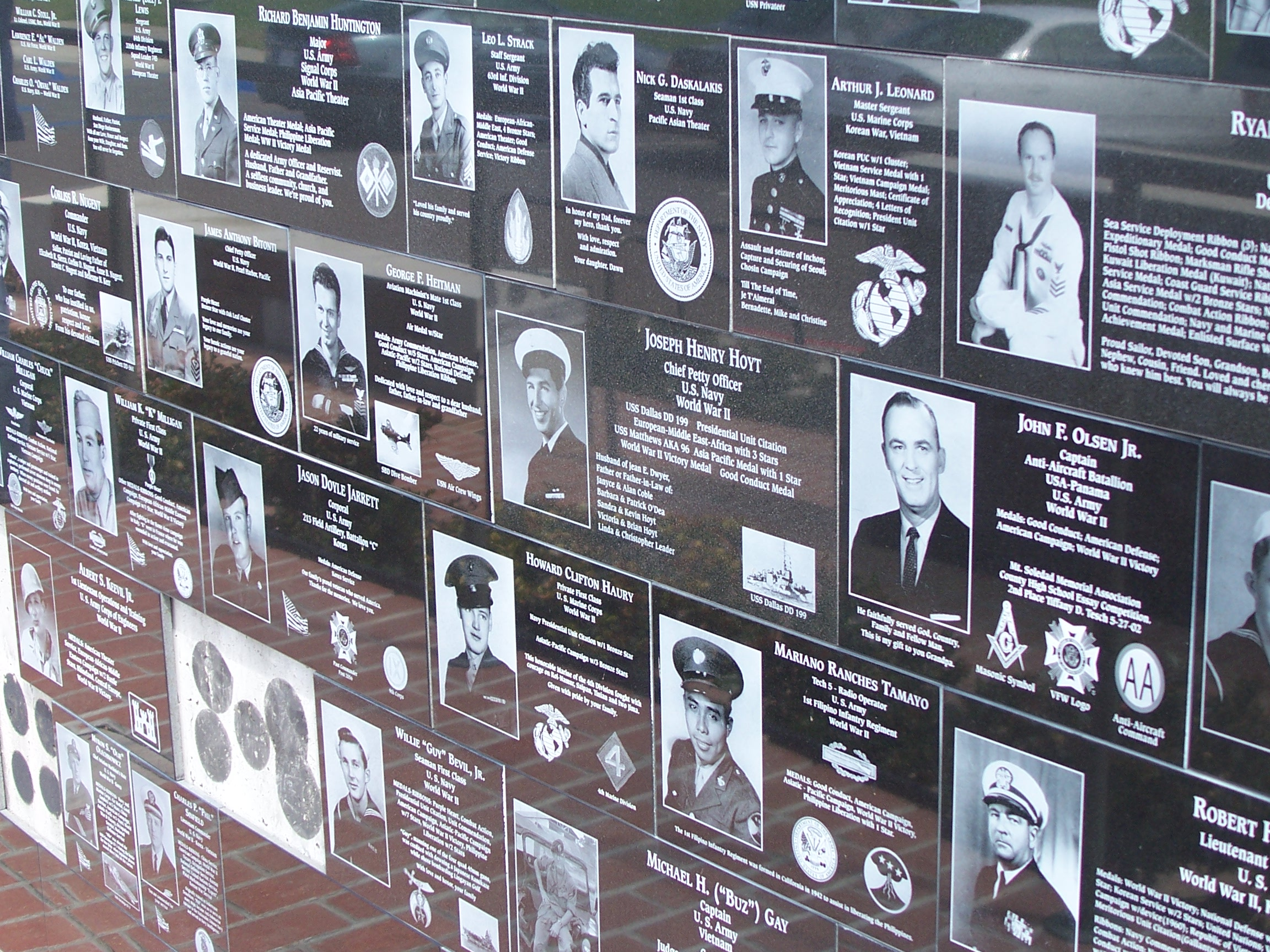
A section of the memorial wall at Mount Soledad

On May 3, 2006, US District Court Judge Gordon Thompson Jr. issued an order for removal of the cross, pursuant to the permanent injunction levied by the court, within 90 days, or the city of San Diego will be fined $5,000 a day. Judge Thompson declared that "It is now time, and perhaps long overdue, for this Court to enforce its initial permanent injunction forbidding the presence of the Mount Soledad Cross on City property." The mayor Jerry Sanders said he plans on proposing an appeal to the decision by Judge Thompson. Sanders pointed out that over 75% of San Diego voters believe the cross should remain in place, as evidenced by the votes in favor of transferring the memorial property to the federal government. The head of the Mount Soledad Memorial Association, the private organization that operates the memorial, hoped that the cross will be taken down and moved to a nearby private property.

On May 11, 2006, the San Diego Union-Tribune reported: "Mayor Jerry Sanders on Thursday sought presidential intervention in the legal battle over the Mount Soledad cross, asking President Bush to use the power of eminent domain to take the city-owned property in La Jolla on which the memorial and cross sit. Sanders warned of the "uncertain future" of the monument and said he fully supported the federal government condemning the property to save the cross, a request first made late Wednesday by Rep. Duncan Hunter, R-Alpine. ... City Attorney Michael Aguirre weighed in on the issue Thursday afternoon – several hours after the mayor's press conference – and he questioned whether the request for federal condemnation of the property violated an existing judicial order. "Such a move may be viewed by the San Diego Superior and United States District courts as being in violation of existing judicial orders and could result in a contempt finding and or sanctions against the city of San Diego," Aguirre said in a statement."

On May 23, 2006, the San Diego City Council voted 5–3 to appeal U.S. District Judge Gordon Thompson Jr.'s May 3 order to remove the cross.

On June 2, 2006, Mayor Jerry Sanders announced that the city had filed an appeal of Judge Thomson's order to remove the cross. The city also asked that the appeal be ruled on by July 8. Sanders said that if the appeal was not granted then the city would comply with the order.

On June 21, 2006, a three-judge panel of the 9th U.S. Circuit Court of Appeals declined to step in and suspend the $5,000 daily fine that will be imposed on the city if the cross wasn't removed from city property by August 1

=== Federal eminent domain action ===
On June 26, 2006, San Diego County Congressmen Rep. Duncan Hunter (R-52nd), Rep. Brian Bilbray (R-50th) and Rep. Darrell Issa (R-49th) introduced House Report Bill 5683, a bill to preserve the Mt. Soledad Veterans Memorial in San Diego, California, by providing for the immediate acquisition of the memorial by the United States.

On July 3, 2006, Supreme Court Justice Anthony M. Kennedy issued a temporary stay in favor of the city and the cross's supporters to allow time for further appeals. On July 7, in a 4-page decision, he granted the city of San Diego's request for a stay pending a ruling on the city's appeal.

On July 19, 2006, House Report Bill 5683, a bill to transfer the Mount Soledad Cross to the federal government passed in the House of Representatives by a vote of 349–74. Sen. Jeff Sessions (R-Ala.) introduced identical legislation in the Senate that would allow the federal government to take the Mt. Soledad property by eminent domain. President George W. Bush, on the day of the vote, issued a "Statement of Administration Policy" that "strongly" supported H.R. 5683. The Statement read, in part, "In the face of legal action threatening the continued existence of the current Memorial, the people of San Diego have clearly expressed their desire to keep the Mt. Soledad Veterans Memorial in its present form. Judicial activism should not stand in the way of the people, and the Administration commends Rep. Hunter for his efforts in introducing this bill."

On August 1, 2006, the US Senate approved by unanimous consent an eminent domain plan to transfer a Latin Cross and the land underneath it to federal control in an effort to avoid a court-ordered removal of the cross that stands on Mt. Soledad Natural Park. The Plaintiff in this cross case sought a court ordered injunction and stay by stopping the transfer until all of the legal issues have been adjudicated in the courts as well as alleging an abuse of power in exercising eminent domain.

On August 11, 2006, Steve Trunk, who is a San Diego resident, veteran, and atheist, was named and added as a Plaintiff to the old and a newly filed lawsuit. U.S. District Court Judge Barry Moskowitz heard Plaintiffs Paulson and Trunk argue the case of the federal involvement in the ownership of a Christian cross. The Plaintiffs had a preliminary restraining order before Judge Moskowitz, which would make the transfer null and void (ab initio). Plaintiffs' Attorney James McElroy accused the federal officials of using eminent domain in bad faith and with the sole purpose to keep the Mt. Soledad Easter Cross on a public park. "These people are sworn to uphold the constitution," McElroy said. "The president has no respect for the law. To do this now with two appeals pending shows disrespect for the court system. There's no reason they couldn't have waited for the appellate courts to decide this."

On August 14, 2006, President George W. Bush signed into law Bill HR 5683 that would transfer City of San Diego property from Mt. Soledad Natural Park along with a Latin Cross to the federal government by applying the powers of eminent domain.

==== Eminent domain is challenged ====
On August 21, 2006, the American Civil Liberties Union representing the Jewish War Veterans of the United States of America filed a separate lawsuit against the U.S. government and Defense Secretary Donald Rumsfeld, charging that the continued display of the Mt. Soledad Latin cross on federally owned land unlawfully entangles government with religion and asks the Court to rule the 29-foot (9 m) tall display be removed from Mt. Soledad Natural Park.

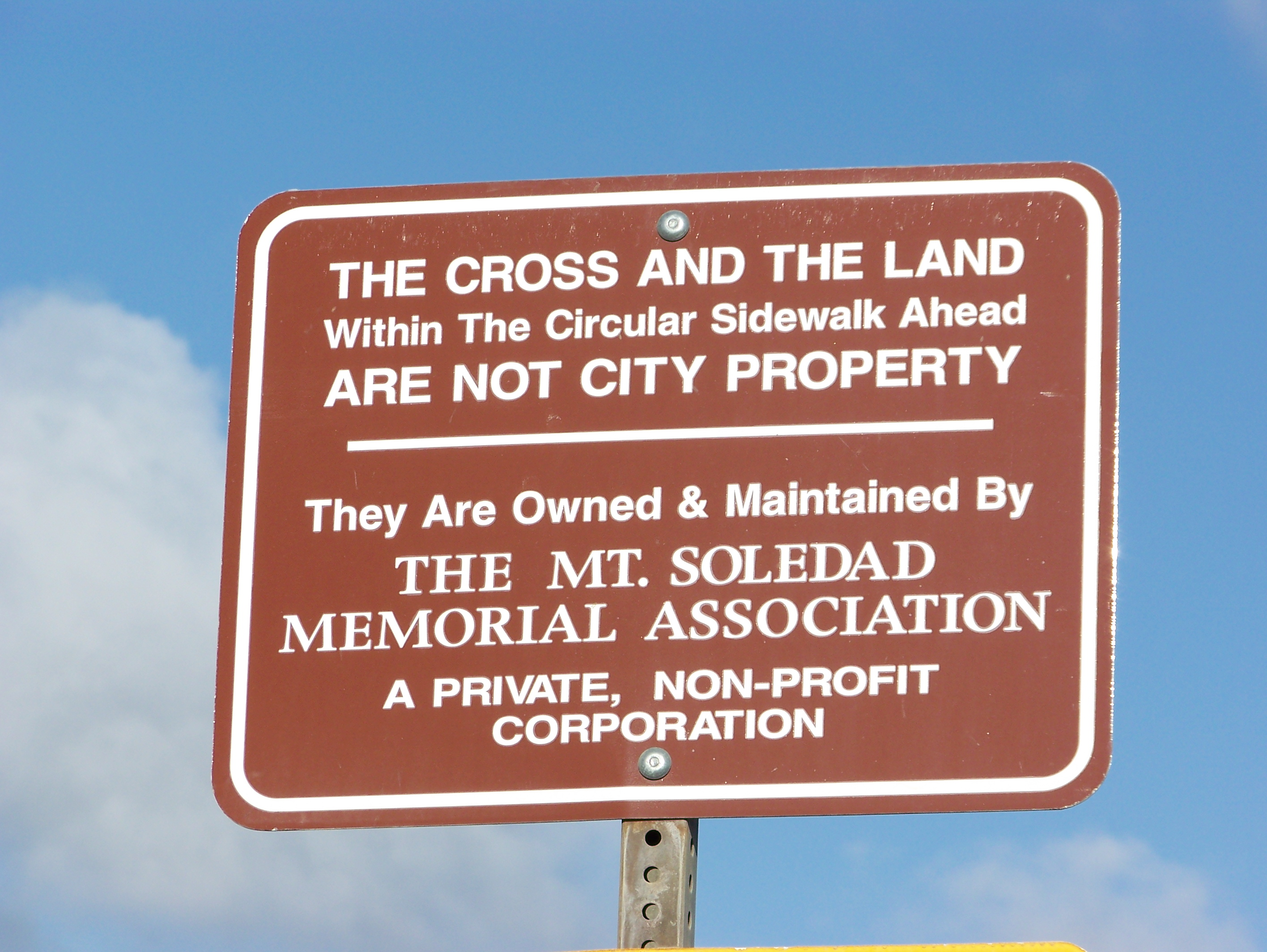
Sign at the entrance to Mount Soledad

On September 22, 2006, U.S. District Court Judge Barry Ted Moskowitz consolidated two separate cases that challenged the constitutionality of a Latin cross on government land atop Mount Soledad, involving a transfer to the US Department of Defense. The consolidated cases involved Philip Paulson and Steven Trunk and the other case was filed by the American Civil Liberties Union, which is representing the Jewish War Veterans, a Muslim, and several San Diego citizens. The 17-year original case brought by Philip Paulson versus City of San Diego was still pending with US District Court Judge Gordon Thompson Jr. and was also pending in the California State Courts, too.

On October 25, 2006, Philip K. Paulson, the original plaintiff in the 1989 lawsuit challenging the legality of the cross, died of liver cancer at the age of 59.

On November 30, 2006, the 4th District Court of Appeal overturned the October 7, 2005 decision by Superior Court Judge Patricia Yim Cowett that invalidated a voter-approved 2005 measure which authorized transferring land underneath the Mount Soledad cross to the federal government, thus declaring that the measure was constitutional.

On February 21, 2007, the California Supreme Court affirmed the precedent-setting decision of the California 4th District appellate court, which upheld the right of the people of San Diego to transfer the Mt. Soledad veterans memorial to the federal government. At the same time, the Court denied the plaintiffs' objection to publication of the lower court decision favorable to the cross and veterans memorial. Unpublished decisions are non-precedential.

On October 12, 2007, the ACLU of San Diego & Imperial Counties filed a motion for Summary Judgement with the Southern District Court of California on behalf of four plaintiffs: the Jewish War Veterans of the United States, Richard A. Smith, Mina Sagheb, and Judith M. Copeland. The motion requested the immediate removal of the cross for the following reasons: the Federal Government's actions with respect to the cross have the effect of advancing or endorsing a religion; the Federal taking and display of the Mt. Soledad cross lacks a valid secular purpose; and finally, the Federal Government's display of the cross creates an excessive entanglement with a religion.

A federal court judge on November 8, 2007 dismissed the lawsuit filed against the City of San Diego involving the Mt. Soledad Veterans War Memorial. The Federal government had acquired the memorial property from the City via eminent domain on August 14, 2006. In dismissing the lawsuit against the City, the federal court agreed that the City should be dismissed from the lawsuit because the federal government owns the memorial property. Now that the City has been dismissed from the lawsuit, the lawsuit will proceed only against the federal government.

On February 25, 2008, after both parties filed cross motions for summary judgment, the court was scheduled to hear arguments.

On July 31, 2008, U.S. Federal Judge Larry Alan Burns ruled that the cross could remain, writing, "The Court finds the memorial at Mt. Soledad, including its Latin cross, communicates the primarily non-religious messages of military service, death and sacrifice. As such, despite its location on public land, the memorial is Constitutional."

In December 2008, a local San Diego painting contractor donated time and material to restore the cross.

==== Case moves to 9th Circuit Court of Appeals ====
The two matters on appeal, Ninth Circuit Court of Appeals, Nos. 08-56415 and 08-56436, were argued on the morning of December 9, 2009.

In January 2011, the United States Court of Appeals for the Ninth Circuit ruled the cross unconstitutional. Judge McKeown wrote for the court, "Overall, a reasonable observer viewing the Memorial would be confronted with an initial dedication for religious purposes, its long history of religious use, widespread public recognition of the Cross as a Christian symbol, and the history of religious discrimination in La Jolla." It was a unanimous decision.

"...we conclude that the Memorial, presently configured and as a whole, primarily conveys a message of government endorsement of religion that violates the Establishment Clause. This result does not mean that the Memorial could not be modified to pass constitutional muster nor does it mean that no cross can be part of this veterans’ memorial. We take no position on those issues.

We reverse the grant of summary judgment to the government and remand for entry of summary judgment in favor of the Jewish War Veterans and for further proceedings consistent with this opinion.

REVERSED AND REMANDED

" —Judge McKeown, opinion for the United States Court of Appeals for the Ninth Circuit

In February 2012, the Liberty Institute, a nonprofit conservative Christian legal group, filed an appeal of the 2011 ruling that found the cross to be unconstitutional. On March 14, the U.S. Solicitor General joined the appeal.

The Supreme Court denied certiorari to hear the case on June 25, 2012. Justice Alito wrote in a personal statement that explained the rejection because the remedy of return to District court for compromise solution had not been attempted. This left the 9th Circuit Court ruling in place, and the issue was returned to federal court for resolution.

In December 2013, U.S. District Judge Larry Burns ordered that the cross be removed within 90 days, but stayed the order pending a forthcoming appeal by the government.

On June 30, 2014, the Supreme Court denied certiorari before judgement. Justice Samuel Alito stated in a personal statement that certiorari was not yet warranted because the appeal of Judge Burns' order has not yet been heard by the Court of Appeals. The National Defense Authorization Act for Fiscal Year 2015 contained a provision making space available for the Mt. Soledad Veterans Memorial.

=== Sale to Mt. Soledad Memorial Association ===
On July 20, 2015, a group called the Mt. Soledad Memorial Association reported that it had bought the land under the cross from the Dept. of Defense for $1.4 million. On September 7, 2016 the 9th U.S. Circuit Court of Appeals issued a one-page ruling, ordering dismissal of the case and an end to all current appeals, stating that the case was now moot because the cross was no longer on government land. Both sides agreed that this decision puts a final end to the case. An ACLU spokesman said, "I think this now resolves the case. The government doesn't own the cross or the land underneath it any more. The government is no longer in the business of endorsing religion."

== Legal challenges timeline ==
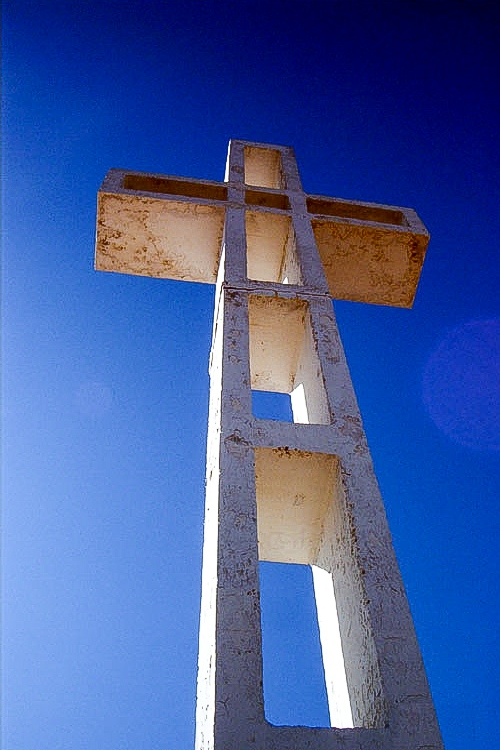
The cross in 2005

- May 31, 1989: Philip Paulson sues the City of San Diego to remove the Soledad Cross
- December 3, 1991: United States District Court for the Southern District of California, ruled in favor Paulson
- June 2, 1992: San Diego voters approved Proposition F, which allowed sale of the cross to a non-profit corporation
- September 18, 1997, Judge Thompson ruled that the sale violated the California Constitution
- 1998: the City attempted to sell the land to a private group again
- 2000: Ninth Circuit Court of Appeals found that the City's sale of the cross violated the California Constitution
- 2003: the Supreme Court denied defendants' petitions for review
- November 2004: voters rejected a ballot measure to authorize a third sale of the land
- July 26, 2005: voters approve Proposition A, a ballot measure to transfer the property to the Interior Department
- October 7, 2005: Judge Cowett found the ballot measure unconstitutional
- July 2006: the Supreme Court issues a stay which stops a court order forcing imminent removal of the cross
- August 14, 2006: President George W. Bush signed a law that would transfer the cross to the Interior Department
- January 2011: the United States Court of Appeals for the Ninth Circuit ruled the transfer unconstitutional
- June 25, 2012: the Supreme Court denied certiorari to hear the case
- July 20, 2015: Mt. Soledad Memorial Association reported that it had bought the land under the cross from the Dept. of Defense
- September 7, 2016: the 9th U.S. Circuit Court of Appeals dismisses the case

== See also ==
- List of national memorials of the United States
- Salazar v. Buono, United States Supreme Court case upholding constitutionality of the transfer of the Mojave Memorial Cross to private ownership
- Mount Davidson (California) § The cross, legal challenges to the Mount Davidson Cross in San Francisco
- Mount Rubidoux § Legal battle, legal challenge to the cross atop the mountain
- Serra Cross (Ventura, California), cross on public land in Ventura, California, which was the subject of litigation
