= Poulson (surname) =

Poulson is a surname. Notable people with the surname include:

- Brandon Poulson (born 1990), American baseball player
- James Poulson (born 1995), English former first-class cricketer
- John Poulson (1910–1993), British architect who caused a major political scandal
- Leeane Poulson (born 1962), horse racing trainer and a New Zealand international lawn bowler
- Marie Poulson, American politician
- Norris Poulson (1895–1982), mayor of Los Angeles, California

== See also ==
- Poulsen, another surname
