= Polson (surname) =

Polson is a surname. Notable people with the surname include:

- Cecily Polson, Australian actor
- John Polson (born 1965), Australian actor
- Nicholas Polson (born 1963), British statistician
- Shannon Huffman Polson, American soldier and writer
- Thomas Andrew Polson (1865–1946), Anglo-Irish writer and politician
- William Polson (1875–1960), New Zealand politician
