= Mount Soledad =

Mountain in San Diego, California

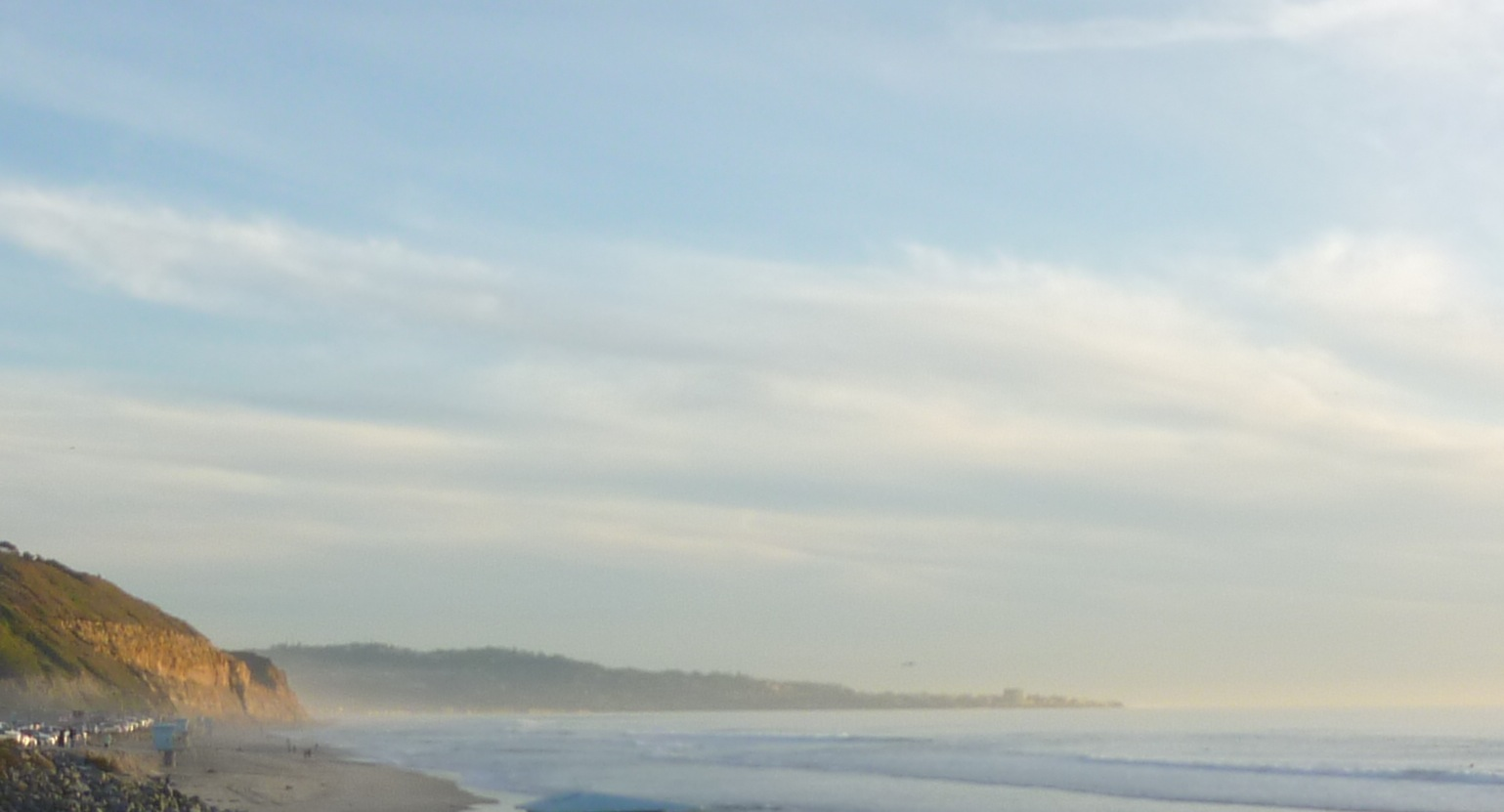
- Mount Soledad seen from the north in Torrey Pines State Natural Reserve

Highest point
- Elevation: 823 ft (251 m) NAVD 88
- Prominence: 472 ft (144 m)
- Parent peak: Black Mountain
- Coordinates: 32°50′24″N 117°15′09″W

Geography
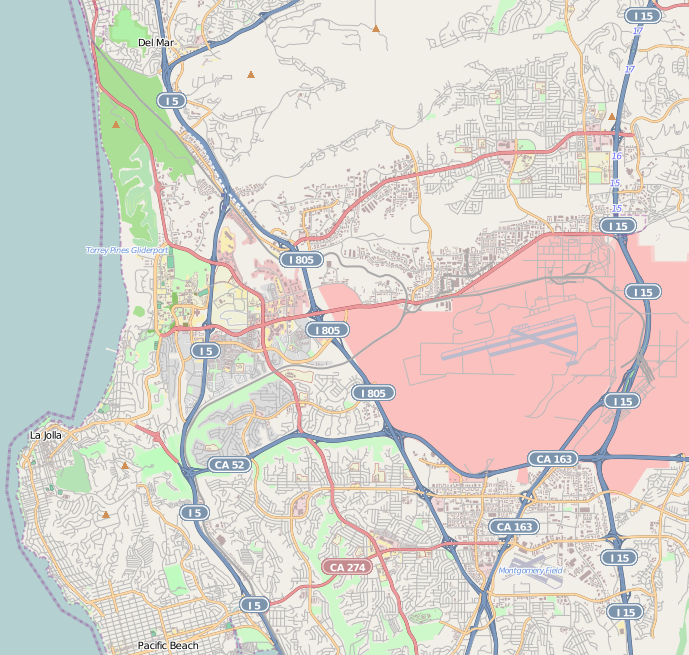
- Location within Northwestern San Diego
- Location: La Jolla, California, U.S.
- Topo map: USGS La Jolla

Mount Soledad, also known as Soledad Mountain, is a prominent landmark in San Diego, California, United States. The mountaintop is the site of the Mount Soledad Cross.

== Geography ==
The 823-foot (251 m) mountain lies between Interstate 5 to the east and the Pacific Ocean to the west. It is mostly within the community of La Jolla where the northern and eastern slopes form a sharp escarpment along the Rose Canyon Fault. The community of Pacific Beach is on the gentler southern slope. There are several radio and television transmitters located on the summit including KFMB-TV and KGTV, the CBS and ABC affiliates respectively. Commercial aircraft approaching San Diego from the direction of Los Angeles often use Mount Soledad as their point to start the downwind leg of their approach to San Diego International Airport.

== Land events ==
On October 3, 2007, a landslide destroyed two homes, damaged several others and ripped up more than 100 yards of a residential street on Soledad Mountain. Five houses were damaged, and over 20 others were evacuated. The City of San Diego had noticed water and gas main leaks since July, and cracks in the pavement since August 2007.

== Legend of Munchkin land ==
There is an urban legend that in the 1930s, a group of little people who appeared in Hollywood films such as The Wizard of Oz, came to San Diego, where they built miniature houses on Mount Soledad.

The legend gained traction due to the fact several houses were built on steep slopes overlooking the Pacific. As passing observers looked down, the perspective made doors and other features appear smaller than normal. Most of the supposed "Munchkin Houses" have been remodeled and the effect is no longer present.

== Last home of Dr. Seuss ==
Mount Soledad is the location of the last home lived in by Dr. Seuss. His widow, Audrey Geisel, resided atop Mount Soledad in a lavish home, which includes an observation tower referred to as the Seuss house by the locals, until her death in 2018.

== Cycling ==
Because of the variety of long steady climbs, light traffic on most routes, and great views, Mount Soledad is a popular cycling destination and area. There are numerous routes ranging from the relatively gradual, 3.5-mile (5.6 km) climb up Soledad Mountain Road on the southern slopes to the very steep and short, 1.25-mile (2.0 km), Hidden Valley Road to Via Capri route on the north side.

== Mount Soledad Cross ==
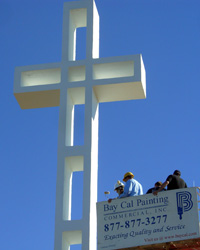
Restoration of the cross in 2008

Mount Soledad is topped by a large concrete Christian cross, first built in 1913, and since rebuilt twice. The third and current version was dedicated in 1954 as the Mount Soledad Easter Cross; the word "Easter" was dropped in the 1980s. After the cross was challenged in court during the late 1980s, it was designated a Korean War memorial. It became the center of a controversy over the display of religious symbols on government property.

It was ruled unconstitutional by the United States Court of Appeals for the Ninth Circuit in January 2011.

On June 25, 2012, the Supreme Court of the United States denied certiorari, allowing the order of the Ninth Circuit to stand.

In July 2015, a group called the Mt. Soledad Memorial Association reported that it had bought the half-acre of land under the cross from the Department of Defense for $1.4 million. On September 7, 2016 the U.S. Court of Appeals for the Ninth Circuit issued a one-page ruling, ordering dismissal of the case and an end to all current appeals, stating that the case was now moot because the cross was no longer on government land. Both sides agreed that this decision puts a final end to the case.

== See also ==
- San Diego Historical Landmarks in La Jolla, California
