= Philip K. Paulson =

Philip Kevin Paulson
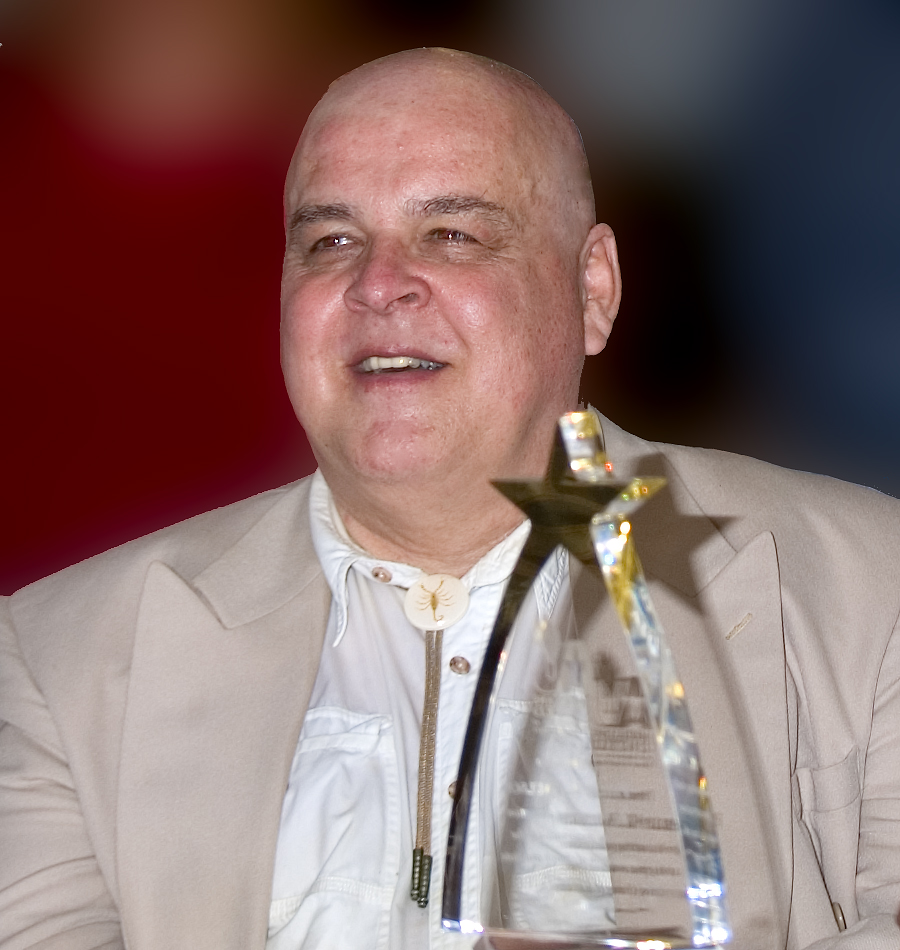
- Phil Paulson. 2006. Recognition ceremony, El Cajon, CA.
- Born: 1947; Clayton, Wisconsin
- Died: October 25, 2006 (aged 58–59); San Diego, California
- Occupation: University Professor
- Known for: Mount Soledad cross controversy

Philip Kevin Paulson (1947 – October 25, 2006) was a U.S. Army combat veteran of the Vietnam War who, as an atheist, was the lead plaintiff in a series of lawsuits to remove a Christian cross from a prominent summit in the city of San Diego. He spent seventeen years, starting with a pro se action against the city, then as lead plaintiff, in multiple successful federal court challenges to remove the 43-foot (13 m) high cross from this government owned land. Although removal was favored by successive court rulings, various tactics, including referendums, appeals and finally removing the underlying land to federal ownership prevented removing the cross.

== Personal life ==
Paulson grew up in the village of Clayton, Wisconsin, and had three older brothers and two younger sisters. He had been married for a brief period but did not have any children.

== Education ==
Paulson earned a bachelor's degree in Journalism and master's degrees in Public Administration and the Management of Information Systems.

== Military service ==
Paulson enlisted in the U.S. Army aged 18 in 1966, becoming a paratrooper, and served two tours of duty in Vietnam, including on Hill 875 in the Battle of Dak To, where his platoon was ambushed and he and a fellow soldier were the only survivors.

== Life after the military ==
After returning from Vietnam, he attended the University of Wisconsin and took a sociology of religion class. Paulson worked in various professions after returning from Vietnam, as a journalist, in shipyards, oil fields, and apple orchards. In the late 1970s, Paulson moved to San Diego and was a professor at National University where he taught business and computing classes.

In 2003 he signed the Humanist Manifesto.

== Involvement in the Mount Soledad Cross Controversy ==
Paulson spent seventeen years arguing that the cross violated the separation of church and state interpretation of the First Amendment of the U.S. Constitution and the No Preference Clause of the California Constitution.

His detractors, led by the only daily newspaper in the city, The San Diego Union Tribune, depicted him as a man on a mission to deny the expression of the majority's religious preference. In numerous articles and letters to the editor he was invariably referred to as "Atheist Philip Paulson", with rarely a mention of his veteran status, having served two combat tours in Viet Nam. Mr. Paulson described his experiences as an atheist in Viet Nam in the article I Was an Atheist in a Foxhole for the American Humanist Association in the September/October 1989 issue of The Humanist magazine.

== Death and Union Tribune interview ==
He refused interviews and public speaking, except for a single interview with the Union Tribune when he learned that he had terminal liver cancer. Upon his death at the age of 59 on October 25, 2006, the newspaper that had led the attacks against him printed his obituary. It contained this quote, which summarized his motivation:

“I fought in Vietnam and I thought I fought to maintain freedom and yet the cross savers in this city would have us believe all of the veterans' sacrifices are in vain, that the Constitution is something to be spit on,” Mr. Paulson said. “The real message is equal treatment under the law, and religious neutrality. That's the purpose of why I did it. It has nothing to do with me being an atheist. The fact is, the Constitution calls for no preference and that's why every judge ruled for me.”

When it became known that Paulson had only months to live, his friends and supporters organized a luncheon to honor him. Over a hundred people, including national leaders of the movement to preserve separation of church and state, attended. Among the many expressions of appreciation, this one speech on YouTube is available, showing Paulson (hair missing due to chemotherapy) in the audience.

In October 2006, the Freedom From Religion Foundation, at its annual convention in San Francisco, gave Paulson its first "Atheist in a Foxhole" award. He attended although he was barely able to travel due to his deteriorating health.
