= Henrik Poulsen =

Henrik Poulsen may refer to:

- Henrik Poulsen, author of the book 77: The Year of Punk and New Wave
- Henrik Poulsen, CEO of Ørsted
