= Arthur R. Paulsen =

American politician

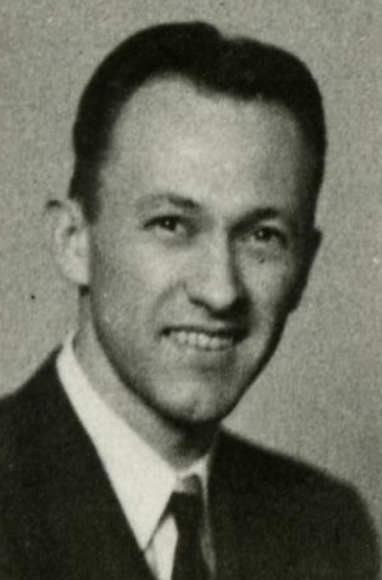
- Paulsen in 1947

Member of the Washington House of Representatives from the 28th district
- In office 1947–1953
- Preceded by: Hugh J. Rosellini
- Succeeded by: C. V. Munsey

Personal details
- Born: December 12, 1916 Tacoma, Washington, U.S.
- Died: October 12, 2010 (aged 93)
- Party: Democratic
- Education: University of Washington

Arthur R. Paulsen (December 12, 1916 – October 12, 2010) was an American politician. He served as a Democratic member for the 28th district of the Washington House of Representatives.

== Life and career ==
Paulsen was born in Tacoma, Washington. He attended the University of Washington.

Paulsen served in the Washington House of Representatives from 1947 to 1953.

Paulsen died on October 12, 2010, at the age of 94.
