= Poulson, Virginia =

Unincorporated community in Virginia, United States

Coordinates: 37°52′33″N 75°38′38″W

Poulson is an unincorporated community in Accomack County, Virginia, United States.
