= Paulson =

People with the name Paulson or its variant spellings include:

- Allen E. Paulson (1922–2000), American businessman
- Andrew Paulson (1958–2017), American businessman
- Barbara Paulson (1928–2023), American human computer
- Bjørn Paulson (1923–2008), Norwegian athlete
- David Paulson (born 1989), American football player
- David E. Paulson (1931–2015), American farmer and politician
- Dennis Paulson (born 1962), American professional golfer
- Erik Paulson (born 1966), American mixed martial artist
- Harvey N. Paulson (1903–1993), American farmer and politician
- Henry "Hank" Paulson (born 1946), American banker and former U.S. Treasury Secretary
- Jacob Paulson (born 1998), Australian rapper, singer, and songwriter, known professionally as JK-47
- Jay Paulson, also known as Jay, (born 1978), American actor
- John Paulson (born 1955), American hedge fund manager
- Jeanne Paulson, American actress
- Lawrence Paulson (born 1955), American computer scientist
- Michael Paulson, American journalist
- Pat Paulson (1927–1997), American comedian who ran for election to the U.S. presidency six times between 1968 and 1996 inclusive
- Philip K. Paulson (1947–2006), American political activist
- Russell Paulson (1897–1980), American farmer and politician
- Sarah Paulson (born 1974), American actress
- Tim Paulson (born 1952), California labor leader
- Webster Paulson (1837–1887), English civil engineer
- Wilber L. Paulson (1896–1954), American businessman and politician
- Wilhelm Paulson (1857–1935), Canadian politician
