= Sally-Ann Poulsen =

Australian biologist

- Education: Griffith University
- Scientific career
- Workplaces: Griffith University; University of Cambridge; AstraZeneca
- Thesis: Pyrazolo 3,4-d pyrimidines : synthesis and structure-activity relationships for binding to adenosine receptors (1996)

Sally-Ann Poulsen is an Australian chemical biologist who is a Professor and Director at Griffith University. Her research considers medicinal chemistry and drug discovery. She is Chair of the Royal Australian Chemical Institute Medicinal Chemistry and Chemical Biology Division.

== Early life and education ==
Poulsen grew up in a rural community in Australia. She attended a small primary school of only seventeen students and one teacher. She was the highest achieving student of her school. After completing high school, Poulsen got a job, and eventually decided to go to university. Poulsen was an undergraduate student at Griffith University, where she was a university medallist. She was the first member of her family to complete higher education. During her bachelor's degree she started to study pyrazolo [3,4-d] pyrimidines. As an undergraduate student, Poulsen was part of the National Youth Science Forum. Poulsen remained at Griffith University for her graduate studies, where she continued to study pyrimidines, looking for structure-function relationships in their binding to adenosine receptors. After earning her doctorate, Poulsen moved to the United Kingdom, where she was a postdoctoral researcher at the University of Cambridge and AstraZeneca. She proposed that adenosine receptors offered novel opportunities of drug design.

== Research and career ==
Poulsen returned to Australia, where she joined the University of Queensland as a Royal Society National Health and Medical Research Council research fellow. After ten months at Queensland, Poulsen returned to Griffith University as an Australian Research Council Queen Elizabeth Fellow. She was made an ARC Future Fellow in 2012, and promoted to Professor in 2014.

Poulsen's research considers medicinal chemistry and drug discovery. She leads fragment-based lead discovery, which looks to identify potent compounds from fragments that weakly bind to targets. Amongst various medical conditions, Poulsen investigated drug resistant brain cancer. Such cancers are typically treated with temozolomide, but they can become resistant over time. Poulsen demonstrated that it is possible to reverse this resistance by blocking the proteins alongside pumps on the surface of glioblastoma cells, which allow the temozolomide to exit the glioblastoma before it reaches high enough levels to destroy the cancer. In March 2021 Poulsen was appointed Deputy Director of the Griffith Institute for Drug Discovery. She is an Associate Editor of MedChemComm.

== Selected publications ==
- Alfonso Maresca; Claudia Temperini; Hoan Vu; Ngoc B Pham; Sally-Ann Poulsen; Andrea Scozzafava; Ronald J Quinn; Claudiu T Supuran (4 March 2009). "Non-zinc mediated inhibition of carbonic anhydrases: coumarins are a new class of suicide inhibitors". Journal of the American Chemical Society. 131 (8): 3057–62. doi:10.1021/ja809683v. ISSN 0002-7863. PMID 19206230. Wikidata Q27653712.
- S A Poulsen; Ronald J. Quinn (1 June 1998). "Adenosine receptors: new opportunities for future drugs". Bioorganic & Medicinal Chemistry. 6 (6): 619–641. doi:10.1016/s0968-0896(98)00038-8. ISSN 0968-0896. PMID 9681130. Wikidata Q40849413.
- Sonia Del Prete; Daniela Vullo; Gillian M Fisher; Katherine T Andrews; Sally-Ann Poulsen; Clemente Capasso; Claudiu T Supuran (15 September 2014). "Discovery of a new family of carbonic anhydrases in the malaria pathogen Plasmodium falciparum--the η-carbonic anhydrases". Bioorganic & Medicinal Chemistry Letters. 24 (18): 4389–96. doi:10.1016/j.bmcl.2014.08.015. ISSN 0960-894X. PMID 25168745. Wikidata Q27973368.
