= Paulsson =

Origin
- Meaning: "son of Paul"
- Region of origin: Sweden

Other names
- Variant forms: Paulson, Palsson

Paulsson is a Swedish patronymic surname meaning "son of Paul", itself an English language derivative of the ancient Roman (pre-Christian) nomen Paulus, meaning "small". There are over 200 variants of the surname. Within Sweden, an alternate spelling is Pålsson, while the Icelandic is Pálsson, and the British Isles is Paulson. Paulsson is uncommon as a given name.

People with the surname include:

- Erik Paulsson (1942–2025), Swedish billionaire businessman
- Gunnar S. Paulsson, British historian
- Haakon Paulsson, joint Earl of Orkney
- Marcus Paulsson, ice hockey player
