= Sara Poulsen =

Danish actress

- Born: Sara Eskander Poulsen; January 2, 1984 (age 41); Copenhagen, Denmark
- Occupation: Actress

Sara Eskander Poulsen (born January 2, 1984) is a Danish actress. She has provided voices for a number of Danish-language versions of foreign television series and films. She is best known for voicing Candace Flynn in Phineas and Ferb and for dubbing Brenda Song's character London Tipton in The Suite Life of Zack & Cody and The Suite Life on Deck.

== Early life ==
Poulsen was born in Copenhagen, Denmark. In 2007, she graduated from Performing Arts School.

== Dubbing roles ==
=== Animated Series ===
- Mandy in Totally Spies!
- Mandy in The Grim Adventures of Billy & Mandy
- Candace Flynn in Phineas and Ferb
- Vicky in The Fairly OddParents
- Layla in Winx Club
- Stella in World of Winx

=== Animated films ===
- EVE in WALL-E
- Bratz: Desert Jewelz
- Bratz Kidz: Sleep-Over Adventure
- Bratz Kidz: Fairy Tales
- Bratz: Fashion Pixiez
- Pokémon: The Movie 2000

=== Live action ===
- London Tipton (Brenda Song) in The Suite Life of Zack & Cody
- London Tipton (Brenda Song) in The Suite Life on Deck
- Jade LaFontaine (Florencia Benítez) in Violetta

== See also ==
- SDI Media Denmark
