= Shannon Huffman Polson =

American writer

Shannon Huffman Polson is an American writer. In 1995, Polson became one of the first women to fly the Apache attack helicopter in the U.S. Army.

== Early life ==
Polson (nee Huffman) was born and reared in Anchorage, Alaska, daughter of an Army JAG officer. She grew up active on the swim team and the debate team, and in her church youth group.

== Education and military career ==
Polson earned her BA from Duke University in English Literature. While home from college after her sophomore year, Polson became the youngest woman at the time to successfully summit Denali, the highest peak in North America. She entered the Army's Aviation Officer Basic Course and Initial Entry Rotary Wing Course at Ft. Rucker, Alabama in the fall of 1993, just after the lifting of aviation Combat Exclusion Policy by Les Aspin in the summer of 1993. She graduated as an honor graduate of the Officer Basic Course and in 1995 qualified on the AH-64A Apache attack helicopter.

In 1995, Polson was the first woman to be assigned as a line pilot to the XVIII Airborne Corps at Ft. Bragg, North Carolina. She worked in operations and led a flight platoon in 3-229th Aviation before transferring to 1-229th Aviation to take a flight platoon on deployment to Bosnia-Herzegovina as part of the Stabilization Force in support of the Dayton Peace Accords. Polson graduated from the Military Intelligence Officer Advanced Course and Army Command and Staff School at Ft. Huachuca, Arizona. She worked as a battalion logistics officer and then took command of A Company, 1-2 Aviation at Camp Page, Korea, becoming the first woman to command an Apache line company in the 2d Infantry Division. Polson's final assignment was at Ft. Bliss, TX, where she worked as an attack operations officer developing time sensitive targeting in theater missile defense in south-west Asia.

Polson earned her Masters in Business Administration from the Tuck School of Business at Dartmouth College in 2003, and her Masters in Fine Arts (Creative Writing) from Seattle Pacific University in 2012. She worked for Guidant Corporation and Microsoft.

In 2009, Polson was recognized as a woman of valor by Senator Maria Cantwell.

She currently is an American writer and leadership development consultant and lecturer.

== Writing ==
Polson's writing appears in Forbes, Huffington Post, High Country News, Market Watch, Business Insider, Psychology Today, River Teeth Journal, Ruminate Magazine, Cirque Journal, and Alaska Magazine and Seattle Magazine among others. Her essay "Naked: A Triptych" won honorable mention in the 2015 VanderMey Nonfiction Contest and was picked up by the Utne Reader. In 2017, Polson published a short story titled "Brown Bird" in The Road Ahead, an anthology of veterans' fiction edited by Adrian Bonenberger and Brian Castner.

== Personal life ==
Polson is married to Peter Polson of Seattle, Washington. They have two children.

== Bibliography ==
Shannon Huffman Polson is the founder of The Grit Institute.

Books from Polson:

- The Grit Factor: Courage, Resilience, and Leadership in the Most Male-Dominated Organization in the World (2020)
- The Way the Wild Gets Inside (2015)
- North of Hope (2013)
