= Svenne Poulsen =

Danish football player and manager (born 1980)

Personal information
- Date of birth: 11 November 1980 (age 45)
- Place of birth: Randers, Denmark
- Height: 1.84 m (6 ft 0 in)
- Positions: Midfielder; right-back

Team information
- Current team: FC Skanderborg (head coach)

Youth career
- Randers KFUM

Senior career*
Years	Team	Apps	(Gls)
1998–2005	Randers FC		
2005–2006	Midtjylland	14	(1)
2006–2007	AGF	23	(2)
2007–2012	Hobro		
2013–2017	Vorup FB		

Managerial career
- 2021–2025: Vorup FB
- 2025–: FC Skanderborg
- * Club domestic league appearances and goals

Svenne Poulsen (born 11 November 1980) is a Danish professional football manager and former player who is the head coach of Jutland Series club FC Skanderborg.

== Playing career ==
Poulsen came to prominence with Randers FC in the Danish 1st Division, and signed a contract extension with the club in May 2003. He helped Randers win promotion to the Danish Superliga, and scored three goals in 23 appearances during the 2004–05 Superliga season.

In 2005, Poulsen joined league rivals FC Midtjylland, where he scored once in 14 appearances in the 2005–06 Superliga season. The following year, he moved to 1st Division club AGF. His contract with AGF was terminated by mutual consent in 2007, after which he joined Danish 2nd Division side Hobro IK. He remained there until leaving the club in December 2012.

== Coaching career ==
After beginning his coaching career with the under-19 team of Randers Freja, Poulsen was appointed head coach of Vorup FB in January 2021. He left the role in November 2024, having led the club from Series 1 to the Denmark Series through two promotions.

After leaving Vorup, Poulsen returned to Randers Freja, where he coached the club's under-15 side. In July 2025, he returned to senior management when he was appointed head coach of Jutland Series club FC Skanderborg.
