= Punitive damages =

Damages assessed in order to punish the defendant for outrageous conduct

Punitive damages, or exemplary damages, are damages assessed in order to punish the defendant for outrageous conduct and/or to reform or deter the defendant and others from engaging in conduct similar to that which formed the basis of the lawsuit. Although the purpose of punitive damages is not to compensate the plaintiff, the plaintiff will receive all or some of the punitive damages in award.

Punitive damages are often awarded if compensatory damages are deemed to be an inadequate remedy by themselves. The court may impose them to prevent undercompensation of plaintiffs and to allow redress for undetectable torts and taking some strain away from the criminal justice system. Punitive damages are most important for violations of the law that are hard to detect.

However, punitive damages awarded under court systems that recognize them may be difficult to enforce in jurisdictions that do not recognize them. For example, punitive damages awarded to one party in a US case would be difficult to get recognition for in a European court in which punitive damages are most likely to be considered to violate ordre public.

Because they are usually paid in excess of the plaintiff's provable injuries, punitive damages are awarded only in special cases, usually under tort law, if the defendant's conduct was egregiously insidious. Punitive damages cannot generally be awarded in contract disputes. The main exception is in insurance bad faith cases in the US if the insurer's breach of contract is alleged to be so egregious as to amount to a breach of the "implied covenant of good faith and fair dealing", and is therefore considered to be a tort cause of action eligible for punitive damages (in excess of the value of the insurance policy). (Note: The landmark cases that established this tort were Comunale v. Traders & General Ins. Co., 50 Cal. 2d 654, 328 P.2d 198, 68 A.L.R.2d 883 (1958) (third-party liability insurance), and Gruenberg v. Aetna Ins. Co., 9 Cal. 3d 566, 108 Cal. Rptr. 480, 510 P.2d 1032 (1973) (first-party fire insurance).)

According to deterrence theory the optimal ratio between punitive and compensatory damages is the multiplicative inverse to the clearance rate and conviction rate. This multiple avoids recidivism, overdeterrence and escaping legal liability due to the dark figure of crime.

== National applications ==
=== Australia ===
In Australia, punitive damages are not available for breach of contract, but are possible for tort cases to the extent that such claims are not prohibited or restricted by statute (e.g. personal injury claims arising from negligence).

The law is less settled regarding equitable wrongs. In Harris v Digital Pulse Pty Ltd, the defendant employees knowingly breached contractual and fiduciary duties to their employer by diverting business to themselves and misusing its confidential information. The New South Wales Court of Appeal held that punitive damages are not available both for breach of contract and breach of fiduciary duty. Heydon JA (as he then was) said there is no power to give punitive damages in respect of a claim in equity, although he was content to decide the case on the narrower ground that there is no power to award punitive damages for the specific equitable wrong in issue. Spigelman CJ concurred, although he emphasized that the contractual character of the fiduciary relationship in question, and refrained from deciding on whether punitive damages would be available in respect of equitable wrongs more analogous to torts. Mason P dissented and opined that there was no principled reason to award punitive damages in respect of common law torts but not analogous equitable wrongs.

=== Canada ===
In Canada, punitive damages may be awarded in exceptional cases for "malicious, oppressive and high-handed" misconduct. The Supreme Court of Canada set out 11 principles to guide judges and juries for awarding punitive damages in the leading case Whiten v Pilot Insurance Co 2002 SCC 18. The principles are not intended to form a checklist or be mandatory, but instead is to be considered based on the facts of each case.

=== England and Wales ===
In England and Wales, exemplary damages in tort cases are limited to cases in which at least one of the circumstances set out by Lord Devlin in the leading case of Rookes v Barnard has been met:

1. Oppressive, arbitrary or unconstitutional actions by the servants of government.
2. Where the defendant's conduct was "calculated" to make a profit for himself.
3. Where a statute expressly authorises the same.

Rookes v Barnard has been much criticised and has not been followed in Canada, Australia (Note: In Australian Consolidated Press Ltd v Uren the Privy Council upheld the Australian rejection of Rookes v Barnard) or New Zealand, despite English cases often being influential in other Commonwealth countries and with the Privy Council. It was strongly criticised by the Court of Appeal in Broome v Cassell, but on appeal the House of Lords upheld Rookes v Barnard.

The second Rookes category—where punitive damages are allowed to remedy conduct by a defendant calculated to make a profit—was applied in a defamation context in Broome v Cassell, and is frequently used in tort actions by tenants against landlords, as well as in cases of insurance fraud.

Examples of statutory authorisation of punitive damages (the third Rookes category) include section 34 of the Crime and Courts Act 2013, which allows claimants to seek, and courts to grant, exemplary damages against news media publishers when they show "a deliberate or reckless disregard of an outrageous nature for the claimant's rights". Some judicial dispute exists as to whether statutory provisions Copyright, Designs and Patents Act 1988 (and predecessors thereof) amount to a statutory authorisation.

Exemplary damages go beyond the philosophical aims of a contractual remedy and are not available as damages for breach of contract. Lord Atkinson said, in Addis v Gramophone Co Ltd:

“In many other cases of breach of contract there may be circumstances of malice, fraud, defamation, or violence, which would sustain an action of tort as an alternative remedy to an action for breach of contract. If one should select the former mode of redress, he may, no doubt, recover exemplary damages, or what is sometimes styled vindictive damages; but if he should choose to seek redress in the form of an action for breach of contract, he lets in all the consequences of that form of action: Thorpe v Thorpe (1832) 3B.&Ad. 580. One of these consequences is, I think, this: that he is to be paid adequate compensation in money for the loss of that which he would have received had his contract been kept, and no more.”

In 1997 the Law Commission recommended that punitive damages should never be available for breach of contract.

=== Germany ===
German courts do not award punitive damages and consider foreign punitive damages unenforceable to the extent that the payment would exceed the damages plus an allowance for reasonable defense costs big enough so that the plaintiff would get a full reimbursement of its loss but not more.

=== Japan ===
Japanese courts do not award punitive damages as a matter of public policy, and Japanese law prohibits the enforcement of punitive damage awards obtained overseas. (Note: Enforcement of foreign awards of punative damaged was prohibited since 2006 by the General Act Related to the Application of Laws, although was predated by the judgment of the Supreme Court of July 11, 1997, 51-6 Minshu 2573, and other precedents.)

In Japan, medical negligence and other species of negligence are governed by the criminal code, which may impose much harsher penalties than civil law. For instance, many causes of action which would subject a defendant to a potential punitive damage award in the U.S. would subject the same individual to prison time in Japan.

=== New Zealand ===
In New Zealand it was held in Donselaar v Donselaar and confirmed in Auckland City Council v. Blundell that the existence of the Accident Compensation Corporation did not bar the availability of exemplary damages. In Paper Reclaim Ltd v Aotearoa International Ltd it was held that exemplary damages are not to be awarded in actions for breach of contract but the court left open the possibility that exemplary damages might be available where the breach of contract is a tort.

In 2010, in Couch v Attorney-General the New Zealand Supreme Court barred exemplary damages for cases of negligence unless the defendant acts intentionally or with subjective recklessness.

Punitive damages can also be awarded for equitable wrongs. In Acquaculture Corporation v New Zealand Green Mussel Co Ltd, the majority of the New Zealand Court of Appeal held that in addition to compensation, punitive damages could be awarded for breach of confidence, albeit that, on the facts, they were not merited. Similarly, in Cook v Evatt (No.2), Fisher J in the New Zealand High Court added exemplary damages of NZ$5,000 to an account of profits of over NZ$20,000 for breach of fiduciary duty.

=== People's Republic of China ===
In very few industries, punitive damages could be awarded in either contractual or tort case, except a tort relevant to product defraud or defect. Article 49 of the PRC Law on Protection of Consumer Rights and Interests enacted on October 31, 1993, provides the rule that any consumer is entitled to a recovery of double the purchase price of products or service from the seller or service provider against their defraud. Successful cases have been widely reported in this regard.

Article 96 of the PRC Law on Food Safety adopted on February 28, 2009, raises the punitive damages to ten times the purchase price added to the compensatory damages that the victim has already claimed from the producer or seller for food with poor quality not compliant to food safety standards. Such a substantial statutory amount considered by the legislative organ is based on several extremely serious food quality incidents in the past two years, such as the notorious Sanlu tainted milk powder case.

Application of the punitive damage rule is further expanded with the enactment of the PRC Law on Tort Liability effective as of July 1, 2010. This new law sets forth that a victim is entitled to claim punitive damages from any manufacturer or seller expressly aware of the defects in products but still produces or sells them if it results in death or heavy injuries. Since this is a somewhat new law so far, no further explanatory regulation regarding a detailed amount and applicable scope is promulgated guiding the application of this rule, so a court judge may have discretional power to decide punitive damages case by case under this new law.

=== United States ===
Punitive damages are a settled principle of common law in the United States. They are generally a matter of state law (although they can also be awarded under federal maritime law), and thus differ in application from state to state. In many states, including California and Texas, punitive damages are determined based on statute; elsewhere, they may be determined solely based on case law. Many state statutes are the result of insurance industry lobbying to impose "caps" on punitive damages; however, several state courts have struck down these statutory caps as unconstitutional. They are rare, occurring in only 6% of civil cases that result in a monetary award. Punitive damages are entirely unavailable under any circumstances in a few jurisdictions, including Nebraska, Puerto Rico, and Washington.

The general rule is that punitive damages cannot be awarded for breach of contract, but if an independent tort is committed in a contractual setting, punitive damages can be awarded for the tort. Although state laws vary, punitive damages are usually allowed only when the defendant has displayed actual intent to cause harm (such as purposefully rear-ending someone else's car), rather than in cases of mere negligence, or causes an injury through action taken in reckless disregard for the lives and safety of others.

Punitive damages are a focal point of the tort reform debate in the United States, where numerous highly publicized multimillion-dollar verdicts have led to a fairly common perception that punitive damage awards tend to be excessive. However, statistical studies by law professors and the Department of Justice have found that punitive damages are only awarded in two percent of civil cases which go to trial, and that the median punitive damage award is between $38,000 and $50,000.

There is no maximum dollar amount of punitive damages that a defendant can be ordered to pay. In response to judges and juries which award high punitive damages verdicts, the Supreme Court of the United States has made several decisions which limit awards of punitive damages through the due process of law clauses of the Fifth and Fourteenth Amendments to the United States Constitution. In a number of cases, the Court has indicated that a 4:1 ratio between punitive and compensatory damages is high enough to lead to a finding of constitutional impropriety and that any ratio of 10:1 or higher is almost certainly unconstitutional. However, the Supreme Court carved out a notable exception to this rule of proportionality in the case of TXO Production Corp. v. Alliance Resources Corp., where it affirmed an award of $10 million in punitive damages, despite the compensatory damages being only $19,000, a punitive-to-compensatory ratio of more than 526-to-1. In this case, the Supreme Court affirmed that disproportionate punitive damages were allowed for especially egregious conduct.

In the case of Liebeck v. McDonald's Restaurants (1994), 79-year-old Stella Liebeck spilled McDonald's coffee in her lap which resulted in second and third-degree burns on her thighs, buttocks, groin and genitals. The burns were severe enough to require skin grafts. Liebeck attempted to have McDonald's pay her $20,000 medical bills as indemnity for the incident. McDonald's refused, and Liebeck sued. During the case's discovery process, internal documents from McDonald's revealed the company had received hundreds of similar complaints from customers claiming McDonald's coffee caused severe burns. At trial, this led the jury to find McDonald's knew their product was dangerous and injuring their customers, and that the company had done nothing to correct the problem. The jury decided on $200,000 in compensatory damages, but attributed 20 percent of the fault to Liebeck, reducing her compensation to $160,000. The jury also awarded Liebeck $2.7 million in punitive damages, which was at the time two days of McDonald's coffee sales revenue. The judge later reduced the punitive damages to $480,000. The case is often criticized for the very high amount of damages the jury awarded. Nevertheless, many legal scholars and documentary film makers like Hot Coffee argued that corporate lobbyists seized the opportunity to create public misinformation and distrust of the legal system by leaving out important facts in their television advertisements, such as, that the verdict was roughly equivalent to two days of coffee sales for McDonald's, that Liebeck received permanent injury to her genitals and groin requiring surgery, and that McDonald's had already received numerous complaints about the temperature of the coffee.

In BMW of North America, Inc. v. Gore (1996), the Supreme Court ruled that an excessive punitive award can amount to an arbitrary deprivation of property in violation of due process. The court held that punitive damages must be reasonable, as determined by the degree of reprehensibility of the conduct that caused the plaintiff's injury, the ratio of punitive damages to compensatory damages, and any comparable criminal or civil penalties applicable to the conduct. In State Farm Auto. Ins. v. Campbell (2003), the Supreme Court held that punitive damages might only be based on the acts of the defendants which harmed the plaintiffs. The court also elaborated on the factors courts must apply when reviewing a punitive award under due process principles.

Most recently, in Philip Morris USA v. Williams (2007), the Supreme Court ruled that punitive damage awards cannot be imposed for the direct harm that the misconduct caused others, but may consider harm to others as a function of determining how reprehensible it was. More reprehensible misconduct justifies a larger punitive damage award, just as a repeat offender in criminal law may be punished with a tougher sentence. Dissenting in the Williams case, Justice John Paul Stevens found that the "nuance eludes me", suggesting that the majority had resolved the case on a distinction that makes no difference.

Punitive damages are subjective by their very nature. Since their purpose is to punish—as opposed to compensate—opinions on how to accomplish this will vary widely among jurors. Regardless, research into punitive damages has revealed some common principles. Wealth of the defendant is positively correlated with large punitive damage awards, jurors either downplay or ignore jury instructions regarding punitive damages determinations, and jurors tend to punish defendants who have conducted a cost-benefit analysis.

==== Important cases ====
- Pac. Mut. Life Ins. Co. v. Haslip, 499 U.S. 1 (1991)
- TXO Production Corp. v. Alliance Resources Corp., 509 U.S. 443 (1993)
- Honda Motor Co. v. Oberg, 512 U.S. 415 (1994)
- BMW of North America, Inc. v. Gore, 517 U.S. 559 (1996)
- Cooper Industries, Inc. v. Leatherman Tool Group, Inc., 532 U.S. 424 (2001)
- State Farm Mutual Automobile Insurance Co. v. Campbell, 538 U.S. 408 (2003)
- Philip Morris USA Inc. v. Williams, 549 U.S. 346 (2007)
- Exxon Shipping Co. v. Baker, 554 U.S. 471 (2008)

== See also ==
- Collateral consequences of criminal conviction
- Criminal justice reform
- Deterrence (penology)
- Loss of rights due to criminal conviction
- Non-economic damages caps
- Overcriminalization
- Penal bond
- Retributive justice
- Suspended sentence
