= Scoppola v Italy (No 3) =

European human rights case

- Court: European Court of Human Rights

Keywords
- Prisoner, right to vote

Scoppola v. Italy (No. 3) (2012) (Application no. 126/05) is a European Court of Human Rights case concerning the restriction of prisoners from voting. In the case, the European Court found that Italian domestic law disenfranchising prisoners was not in conflict with Article 3 of Protocol 1 of the European Convention on Human Rights. The court also clarified a previous decision made on this matter in Hirst v UK (No 2), where a blanket ban on prisoners from voting was found to be in violation of Convention rights. Generally, the Court found that the disenfranchisement of prisoners was acceptable as long as it was proportionate to the crime that was committed and in the pursuance of a legitimate aim (reducing crime, enhancing civic participation, etc...).

== Background ==
=== Article 3 Protocol 1 ===
The High Contracting Parties undertake to hold free elections at reasonable intervals by secret ballot, under conditions which will ensure the free expression of the opinion of the people in the choice of the legislature.

Although Article 3 of Protocol 1 of the European Convention on Human Rights does not explicitly guarantee the right to vote, it is generally interpreted as such by the European Court of Human Rights (and subsequent judgments have reinforced this view). Article 3 of Protocol 1 also protects the rights of citizens to stand for election as well as vote. Any restriction imposed on the right to vote must be in pursuance of a state's legitimate aim and carried out proportionately. At the time Scoppola's judgement was made, the majority of ECHR signatories did restrict the voting rights of prisoners to some degree.

=== Hirst v United Kingdom (No 2) ===
In Hirst v UK (No 2), the European Court found that the United Kingdom's blanket restriction on all prisoners from voting was not in line with the ECHR, declaring it to be "automatic and indiscriminate". This was met with some controversy within the UK, with many conservatives criticizing the decision as an overreach and Prime Minister David Cameron describing the idea of prisoners voting as making him "physically ill". Although the Cameron government would publish a draft Bill covering potential solutions in 2012, no action was taken by the UK government to address the discrepancy. In the case of Scoppola, the European Court would look towards the precedent established by Hirst when dealing with instances of disenfranchisement. The UK would also make themselves a party to Scoppola by making statements to the Court in support of Italy, and encouraging the Court to reconsider their Hirst judgement.

== Facts ==
In 2000, Franco Scoppola had been tried and convicted for the murder of his wife and assault of his son. At the time, Italian law stipulated that those serving a sentence longer than three years were deprived of the right to vote (for sentences longer than five years, this ban would be permanent). He was given a life sentence (later reduced to thirty years) and a lifetime ban from public office, which brought with it a permanent restriction from voting. After having exhausted all possible appeals domestically, Scoppola appealed to the European Court of Human Rights. In 2011, a Chamber of the Second Section of the Court ruled in favor of Scoppola, finding that Italian domestic law was "automatic and indiscriminate" in its disenfranchisement. The Italian government would subsequently make a request for the Grand Chamber to hear the case, which was granted.

The Italian government would argue that disenfranchisement was not "automatic" because the decision to disenfranchise would be made after conviction by a trial court, and that the restoration of voting rights was possible with a successful application for rehabilitation (which could be made after serving a minimum of three years of a sentence). They would also argue that the restriction of voting rights was in pursuit of the legitimate aims of reducing crime and enhancing civic participation. Scoppola's lawyers would argue, conversely, that disenfranchisement did not serve as a deterrent to crime and that the disenfranchisement was "automatic" in the sense that all prisoners serving sentences longer than five years would be disallowed from voting regardless of the nature of their crime.

The United Kingdom would also make themselves a party to the case as a third-party intervener. They would emphasize the generally wide margin of appreciation given to states to decide restrictions on voting, and would also argue that current UK law was not in violation of Convention Rights. They would also encourage the Court to reconsider their previous judgement made in Hirst v UK.

== Judgement ==
The Grand Chamber would rule 16-1 in favor of the Italian government, finding that, "in the circumstances of the present case, the restrictions imposed on the applicant's right to vote did not "thwart the free expression of the people in the choice of the legislature", and maintained "the integrity and effectiveness of an electoral procedure aimed at identifying the will of the people through universal suffrage"". In their ruling, the Court would reaffirm the usage of disenfranchisement as a legitimate means of reducing crime and encouraging civic participation. Because disenfranchisement was not used as punishment for minor offenses, and because the revocation of voting rights was only done after conviction in trial court, the Court found that it could not be considered "automatic and indiscriminate". The Court also emphasized that Italian domestic law (in contrast with the United Kingdom), clearly defined which crimes (and sentences) would bring about disenfranchisement as well as providing a path for the restoration of voting rights. The Court would also stress the generally wide margin of appreciation given to states with regard to electoral systems/voting.

The Court also considered statements made by the government of the United Kingdom. While the Court would reaffirm the precedent established in Hirst (that being that a blanket ban on voting would be a violation), they would clarify that some restrictions made by states on the right to vote are acceptable, given that they are made in the pursuit of a legitimate aim and are carried out fairly. The Court would ultimately refuse to reconsider their previous judgement.

In his lone dissenting opinion, judge David Björgvinsson would argue in favor of the original Second Chamber judgement. He would go on to state that the precedent established in Hirst was applicable, and that the Court had interpreted Hirst too narrowly, writing "the judgment in the present case has now stripped the Hirst judgment of all its bite as a landmark precedent for the protection of prisoners' voting rights in Europe".

== Reactions ==
As with the Hirst judgement, reactions to Scoppola were generally mixed, with commentators Natasha Holcroft-Emmess and Ruvi Ziegler criticizing the decision as inconsistent with previous rulings and failing to solidify the Court's decision in Hirst. Some viewed Scoppola as a rolling back of the right of prisoners to vote, as well as the Court taking a more conciliatory stance towards the United Kingdom. Javier Jaramillo, writing for the Boston College International and Comparative Law Review, would comment that "The ECtHR may have responded to pressure from the United Kingdom because of its dependency on the goodwill of national governments for enforcement of its rulings.". Cesare Pitea, writing for Strasbourg Observers, would comment that "The resulting scenario is puzzling and bears a potential for inconsistent outcomes that are difficult to understand.".

Within the United Kingdom, reception skewed more positive. Carl Gardner, writing for his blog Head of Legal, would comment that "today's judgment of the Grand Chamber of the European Court of Human Rights, about prisoner's rights to vote, represents a small but significant victory for the British government." and that the decision "gives significantly more flexibility to the UK in the way it brings in prisoners' votes.".

== See also ==
- Hirst v United Kingdom (No 2)
- European Court of Human Rights
- Disfranchisement
