= Monastery death =

Form of civil death

Monastery death (German: Klostertod; French: mort civile des religieux) was a form of civil death – the loss of legal capacity of living persons – known to common and civil law. The monastery death happened in some jurisdictions when a person entered a monastery or nunnery and professed into consecrated life. Upon entering the religious order, the person was considered dead in private law. Either their normal heirs or the monastery or nunnery inherited all of their possessions.

== Jurisdictions ==
=== English common law ===
Under early English common law a living person could under certain conditions be considered legally dead (civiliter mortuus). One category which resulted in civil death was profession (the others being abjuration and banishment). When a person entered monastic life, they became dead in law.

William Blackstone wrote in his 18th-century Commentaries on the Laws of England that if a person "enters into religion; that is goes into a monastery and becomes a monk professed" that this person would be "absolutely dead in law." According to Blackstone a person entering monastic life could make his testament and would otherwise "die" intestate. The primary reason for this civil death given by Blackstone is that a monk renounces all secular concerns upon his profession and secludes himself from society and should therefore also not enjoy its legal protections.

=== German law ===
A concept of monastery death (Klostertod) was also known to German law. Under medieval German law (Germanic law), a person who entered into a holy order was considered dead to the world. This was attested to in the Sachsenspiegel (Ldr. I, 25, 3) and the Schwabenspiegel (Ldr. I, 27). With the entry into the monastery or nunnery, future acquisition of property was precluded for the monk or nun themselves and for the monastery or nunnery acting for them.

The German legal scholar Otto von Gierke noted that German territories in which the ius commune was applied did not consider a monk or nun civilly dead, because Catholic canon law did not contain such a rule and instead considered the monastery or nunnery to be the successor of the person in holy order. Nevertheless, even in jurisdictions in which the ius commune applied, a monk lacked capacity to sue or be sued, as the Higher Regional Court of Frankfurt decided as late as 1892.

Prussian law did not follow the ius commune, but the even stricter earlier Germanic point of view. The 1792 General State Laws for the Prussian States (Allgemeines Landrecht für die Preußischen Staaten) contained detailed rules on monastery death in its second part, title 11, sections 1167, 1199 to 1205. Part II title 11 sections 1199 and 1120 read:

§. 1199. Nach abgelegtem Klostergelübde werden Mönche und Nonnen, in Ansehung aller weltlichen Geschäfte, als verstorben angesehen.
§. 1199. After taking monastic vows, monks and nuns are considered deceased with regard to all worldly affairs.
§. 1200. Sie sind unfähig, Eigenthum oder andre Rechte zu erwerben, zu besitzen, oder darüber zu verfügen.
§. 1200 They are incapable of acquiring, possessing, or disposing of property or other rights.

— Part II Title 11 Sections 1199 and 1120 of the General State Laws for the Prussian States

The Reichsgericht last considered monastery death in a 1893 decision, where it had to apply Russian law to a Russian nun's legal capacity and found that she had some legal capacity. With the entry into force of the Bürgerliches Gesetzbuch (German Civil Code) on 1 January 1900, monastery death was abolished in the whole of the German Empire.

=== French law ===
Monastery death (French: mort civile des religieux) was a feature of French law until the 18th century. Similar to the distinction between different German territories, French legal scholars discussed whether the monastery or nunnery succeeded the monk or nun, or whether the civil death of the person in holy order resulted in inheritance by his or her natural heirs.

After the French revolution and the introduction of laïcité, the concept of monastery death was abolished in French law. It was not restored under the Napoleonic Code Civil; even though the Code Civil originally contained an article dealing exclusively with mort civile (Article 25), entry into a monastery or nunnery did not result in it.

=== Catholic canon law ===
A form of monastery death is still part of Catholic canon law. Can. 668 § 5 of the 1983 Code of Canon Law of the Latin Church proclaims that a "professed religious" under certain circumstances loses "the capacity of acquiring and possessing". Acquisitions "contrary to the vow of poverty" are invalid and property gained after the profession belongs to the religious order. The primary religious basis for this is that counsel of poverty is among the evangelical counsels.

The loss of legal capacity does not, however, happen automatically if a person enters into a religious order. It happens only when the specific religious order requires a full renunciation of property before a perpetual profession (Can. 668 § 4). After this full renunciation the professed religious loses his or her legal capacity (capacitas acquirendi et possidendi). Anything that he or she may acquire after the renunciation is immediately transferred to the respective religious order.

§ 5. A professed religious who has renounced his or her goods fully due to the nature of the institute loses the capacity of acquiring and possessing and therefore invalidly places acts contrary to the vow of poverty. Moreover, whatever accrues to the professed after renunciation belongs to the institute according to the norm of proper law.

— Can. 668 § 5 of the 1983 Code of Canon Law
