= Collateral Consequences Calculator =

The Collateral Consequences Calculator is a legal website designed to aid judges, attorneys, and legal academics in their research of collateral consequences of criminal charges. It is currently being developed as a joint project between students in the Lawyering in the Digital Age Clinic at Columbia Law School and the Columbia Center for New Media Teaching and Learning. The content is overseen by legal experts in the covered areas.

== History ==
Judith Kaye, former Chief Judge of the State of New York, initiated the Partners in Justice Colloquium in 2005 to bring together judges, legal practitioners, and law professors to improve collaboration between the different legal spheres concerning social justice issues. The focus of this initial conference was to gain a better understanding of collateral consequences of criminal charges. One of the results was the development of the "Four C's" website, which provides a collection of resources in each of the substantive areas where collateral consequences may occur. Due to the success of this site, development began on the Collateral Consequences Calculator, a "groundbreaking initiative" that will provide a convenient, easy-to-use overview of collateral consequences associated with specific sections of New York State Penal Law. It became publicly available on in May, 2010.

== Current status ==
The Calculator currently provides information in two important areas: immigration and public housing eligibility in New York City. The immigration consequences have been determined for the top 51 crimes that are either commonly charged or have commonly misunderstood immigration consequences. The housing consequences have been determined for the entire New York penal code, but apply only to New York City public housing.
