= Darby v. Cisneros =

- Supreme Court of the United States

Argued March 22, 1993 Decided June 21, 1993
- Full case name: R. Gordon Darby, et al. v. Henry Gabriel Cisneros, Secretary of Housing and Urban Development, et al.
- Citations: 509 U.S. 137 (more) 113 S. Ct. 2539; 125 L. Ed. 2d 113

Case history
- Prior: Certiorari to the United States Court of Appeals for the Fourth Circuit

Holding
- Federal courts cannot require exhaustion of administrative remedies unless mandated by statute or agency rules.

Court membership
- Chief Justice William Rehnquist Associate Justices Byron White · Harry Blackmun; John P. Stevens · Sandra Day O'Connor; Antonin Scalia · Anthony Kennedy; David Souter · Clarence Thomas

Case opinion
- Majority: Blackmun, joined by unanimous

Laws applied
- Administrative Procedure Act (APA), 5 U.S.C. §§ 701–706

Darby v. Cisneros, 509 U.S. 137 (1993), was a case in which the United States Supreme Court held that federal courts cannot require that a plaintiff exhaust his administrative remedies before seeking judicial review when exhaustion of remedies is not required by either administrative rules or statute.

== Facts of the case ==
R. Gordon Darby, a real estate developer in South Carolina, was banned from participating in Department of Housing and Urban Development programs for 18 months. He and others filed in federal court even though they had not exhausted the internal HUD review process. Henry Cisneros, as HUD Secretary, was the respondent.

== See also ==
- List of United States Supreme Court cases, volume 509
- List of United States Supreme Court cases by the Rehnquist Court
