= Hartford Fire Insurance Co. v. California =

- Supreme Court of the United States

Argued February 23, 1993 Decided June 28, 1993
- Full case name: Hartford Fire Insurance Company, et al., Petitioners 91-1111 v. California, et al.; and Merrett Underwriting Agency Management Limited, et al., Petitioners 91-1128 v. California, et al.
- Citations: 509 U.S. 764 (more) 113 S. Ct. 2891; 125 L. Ed. 2d 612; 1993 U.S. LEXIS 4404; 61 U.S.L.W. 4855; 1993-1 Trade Cas. (CCH) ¶ 70,280; 93 Cal. Daily Op. Service 4830; 93 Daily Journal DAR 8186; 7 Fla. L. Weekly Fed. S 638

Case history
- Prior: In re Ins. Antitrust Litig., 723 F. Supp. 464 (N.D. Cal. 1989); reversed, 938 F.2d 919 (9th Cir. 1991); cert. granted, 506 U.S. 814 (1992).

Holding
- The Court stated that "it is well established by now that the Sherman Act applies to foreign conduct that was meant to produce and did in fact produce some substantial effect in the United States."

Court membership
- Chief Justice William Rehnquist Associate Justices Byron White · Harry Blackmun; John P. Stevens · Sandra Day O'Connor; Antonin Scalia · Anthony Kennedy; David Souter · Clarence Thomas

Case opinions
- Majority: Souter (parts I, II-A), joined by unanimous court (parts I, II-A); Rehnquist, White, Blackmun, Stevens (parts III, IV)
- Majority: Scalia (part I), joined by Rehnquist, O'Connor, Kennedy, Thomas
- Concurrence: Souter (part II-B), joined by White, Blackmun, Stevens
- Dissent: Scalia (part II), joined by O'Connor, Kennedy, Thomas

Laws applied
- Sherman Antitrust Act

Hartford Fire Insurance Co. v. California, 509 U.S. 764 (1993), was a controversial United States Supreme Court case which held that foreign companies acting in foreign countries could nevertheless be held liable for violations of the Sherman Antitrust Act if they conspired to restrain trade within the United States, and succeeded in doing so.

== Facts ==
Various reinsurance companies in the United Kingdom had conspired through Lloyd's of London to coerce U.S. insurers into abandoning certain policy practices that were beneficial to consumers, but costly to the reinsurers. When U.S. states (including the named plaintiff, California) filed a lawsuit alleging antitrust violations, the defendant companies raised a number of defenses, asserting that the United States lacked jurisdiction over their acts, that various statutes exempted them from liability, and that principles of comity dictated that they should not be brought before a U.S. court. The United States district court in which the case was brought accepted these arguments and dismissed the case. The Court of Appeals reversed the dismissal.

== Result ==
The Supreme Court, in an opinion by Justice Souter, stated that "it is well established by now that the Sherman Act applies to foreign conduct that was meant to produce and did in fact produce some substantial effect in the United States."

The defendants raise, and the Court rejects the applicability of § 402 of the Foreign Trade Antitrust Improvements Act of 1982 (FTAIA), which states that the Sherman Act does not apply to conduct involving foreign trade or commerce (other than import trade or import commerce), unless "such conduct has a direct and reasonably foreseeable effect" on domestic or import commerce. The Court found that the conduct at issue here clearly had such an effect.

The Court also found that, in enacting the FTAIA, the U.S. Congress did not intend to write principles of comity into the Sherman Act - but even if they had, this would not affect the outcome. Both the defendant and Hartford argued that the conduct in which the reinsurers had engaged was lawful in the United Kingdom. Nevertheless, the Court looked to the Restatement (Third) Foreign Relations Law, § 415, Comment j for the principle that:

The fact that conduct is lawful in the state in which it took place will not, of itself, bar application of the United States antitrust laws, even where the foreign state has a strong policy to permit or encourage such conduct.

Furthermore, the Court cited Restatement (Third) Foreign Relations Law, § 403, Comment e for the proposition that no conflict exists "where a person subject to regulation by two states can comply with both."

== Dissent ==
Justice Scalia dissented, joined in part by Justices O'Connor, Kennedy, and Thomas. Scalia acknowledged that the federal courts had jurisdiction over this case, and that the Sherman Act could be applied extraterritorially, so long as the foreign acts complained of were directed into the United States. Nevertheless, Scalia contended that the actions of the U.S. courts showed a lack of judicial respect for the comprehensive regulatory scheme enacted by the UK. Although Congress may have intended the Sherman Act to apply to acts originating abroad, it was unreasonable to assume that Congress intended to apply the antitrust laws where they would be disruptive of another country's legislative scheme.

== See also ==
- List of United States Supreme Court cases, volume 509
- List of United States Supreme Court cases
- Lists of United States Supreme Court cases by volume
- List of United States Supreme Court cases by the Rehnquist Court
