= The Hartford =

US-based insurance and investment company

The Hartford Insurance Group, Inc.

- The Hartford’s HQ Campus in Hartford, Connecticut
- Type: Public
- Traded as: NYSE: HIG; S&P 500 Component
- Industry: Insurance; Mutual funds
- Founded: 1810; 216 years ago
- Headquarters: Hartford, Connecticut, U.S.
- Key people: Christopher J. Swift; (Chairman & CEO); Beth A. Costello; (Executive VP & CFO); Allison Niderno; (Senior VP & Controller)
- Products: Automobile insurance; Property insurance; General liability insurance; Workers' compensation; Group benefits; Mutual funds; Exchange-traded funds
- Revenue: ▲US$28.4 billion (2025)
- Operating income: ▲US$3.8 billion (2025)
- Net income: ▲US$3.8 billion (2025)
- AUM: ▲US$154.2 billion (December 31, 2025)
- Total assets: ▲US$86.0 billion (2025)
- Total equity: ▲US$19.0 billion (2025)
- Number of employees: ~27,220 (2026)
- Website: TheHartford.com

The Hartford Insurance Group, Inc., known as The Hartford, is a Hartford, Connecticut-based insurance company. The Hartford is a Fortune 500 company headquartered in its namesake city of Hartford, Connecticut. It was ranked 162nd in Fortune 500 in 2024. It sells products primarily through a network of agents and brokers, and has also been the auto and home insurance writer for AARP members for more than 40 years.

The Hartford Fire Insurance Company building at the company’s headquarters in Hartford, Connecticut

== History ==
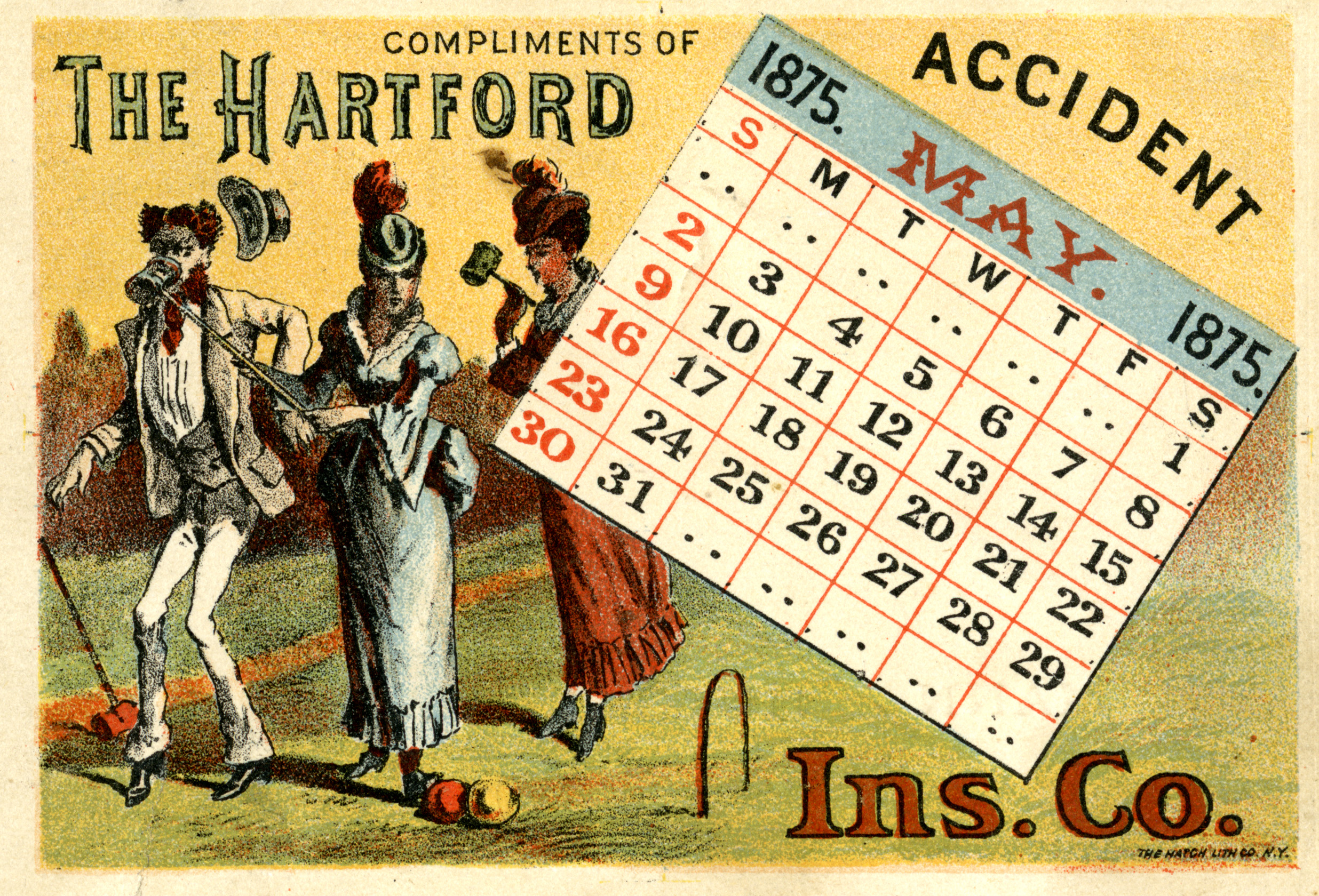
1875 postcard calendar for the Hartford Accident Insurance Co.

The Hartford was founded in 1810 in Hartford, Connecticut. Local merchants gathered in a Hartford inn and, with working capital of $15,000, founded the Hartford Fire Insurance Company. The company survived some of the greatest peacetime tragedies in American history. After a huge fire destroyed New York's financial district in 1835, The Hartford's president, Eliphalet Terry, used his personal wealth to cover all the company's damage claims.

=== The Hartford Stag ===
Although it is unknown exactly when the symbol first appeared as The Hartford's logo, the earliest use on record is on the 1861 policy issued to Abraham Lincoln. It depicts a hart (stag) fording a stream. The company's logo was likely inspired by the seal of the city of Hartford, which in turn borrowed from the 17th-century seal of Hertford, England. By 1867, the logo began to echo the majestic stag depicted in Sir Edwin Landseer's 1851 painting, “The Monarch of the Glen.” The logo art and style have continued to shift throughout the years to adjust to the changing art and print needs, however, the stag remains a clear descendant of the “Monarch of the Glen.”

=== Acquisitions, divestitures and related changes ===
- 2025: The Hartford rebrands and reveals a new logo.
- 2021: Chubb makes three takeover offers for The Hartford, but the offers were rejected on 28 April.
- 2020: Castel Underwriting Europe B.V. has decided to acquire from The Hartford the renewal rights for a Navigators Europe book consisting mostly of Dutch naval freight, inland hull, land-based equipment and liability company.
- 2019: Acquired Navigators, adding specialty products across 22 vertical markets, and offices in the United Kingdom, Continental Europe and Asia.
- 2018, Acquired Y-Risk, a managing general underwriter specializing in economy risks, with managing general agencies across the U.S.
- 2014: Sold its Japan annuities business to Orix Life Insurance Corp.
- 2013: Sold its life insurance business to Prudential, retirement plans to MassMutual and a broker-dealer to AIG.
- 2012: Announced it would focus on property and casualty insurance, group benefits and mutual funds, and would sell its wealth management businesses.
- 2009: The company announced that it was withdrawing its business activities from Europe.
- 2004: Purchased the Group Benefits Division of CNA Financial. The division was based in Chicago, Illinois.
- 2000: On June 27, acquired the roughly 19% of Hartford Life it did not already own, making it a wholly owned subsidiary again.
- 1997: Changed name from ITT-Hartford Group, Inc. to the Hartford Financial Services Group, Inc., and also issued an IPO for its Hartford Life business under the ticker symbol "HLI."
- 1995: ITT decided to streamline its operations and release some of its subsidiaries, and The Hartford became an independent entity once again, trading on the New York Stock Exchange under the symbol "HIG."
- 1970: The Hartford was acquired by ITT Corporation for $1.4 billion, at the time the largest corporate takeover in American history. The combined company was renamed ITT-Hartford Group, Inc.
- 1959: Expanded into the life insurance business by acquiring The Columbian National Life Insurance Company in Boston, Massachusetts.
- 1913: Formed the Hartford Accident and Indemnity Company to provide a wide variety of insurance coverage, including accident, automobile-liability, personal-damage, business-interruption and more.

== See also ==
- Great Fire of New York
- Hartford Fire Insurance Co. v. California
- List of United States insurance companies
- The Monarch of the Glen (painting), upon which the company logo is based
