= TXO Production Corp. v. Alliance Resources Corp. =

- Supreme Court of the United States

Argued March 31, 1993 Decided June 25, 1993
- Full case name: TXO Production Corp. v. Alliance Resources Corp.
- Docket no.: 92-479
- Citations: 509 U.S. 443 (more) 499 U.S. 1, 186 W. Va. 656, 413 S. E. 2d 897, 207 U.S. 73, 251 U.S. 63, 224 U.S. 270, 286, 238 U.S. 482, 212 U.S. 86, 111

Holding
- The punitive damages awarded do not violate Due Process, and no test can be created to distinguish constitutionally acceptable or unacceptable damages that would fit every case.

Court membership
- Chief Justice William Rehnquist Associate Justices Byron White · Harry Blackmun; John P. Stevens · Sandra Day O'Connor; Antonin Scalia · Anthony Kennedy; David Souter · Clarence Thomas

Case opinions
- Plurality: Stevens, joined by Rehnquist, Blackmun, Kennedy (in part)
- Concurrence: Kennedy
- Concurrence: Scalia, joined by Thomas
- Dissent: O'Connor, joined by White, Souter (in part)

Laws applied
- U.S. Const. amend. XIV

TXO Production Corp. v. Alliance Resources Corp., 509 U.S. 443 (1993), was a decision by the Supreme Court of the United States, which upheld the decision of the West Virginia state court awarding $19,000 in compensatory damages and $10 million in punitive damages to the plaintiff. Although multiple justices recognized that the punitive damages were 526 times the compensatory damages, the Court held a "general concern of reasonableness" should guide courts in determining constitutionally acceptable damages under the due process clause of the Fourteenth Amendment.

== Background ==
TXO Production Corp., a subsidiary of USX, approached Alliance Resources Corp. in 1984 following a recommendation to recover oil and gas under the Blevins Tract by their geologists. TXO offered to pay Alliance $20/acre in cash, 22% of oil and gas revenues in royalties, and all development costs for the site, an offer which Alliance accepted on April 2, 1985. Alliance agreed to return this payment if TXO's attorney determined that "title had failed." TXO's attorneys then discovered a 1958 deed awarding coal recovery rights under the Blevins Tract from Tug Fork Land Company to a series of owners, culminating in the Virginia Crews Coal Company. Interviews with all holders of that deed confirmed that only coal rights were awarded, while the grantor reserved rights to oil and gas. TXO first attempted to make the original holder of the deed state that the 1958 deed might have included the oil and gas rights in question by presenting a pre-written affidavit, which he refused to sign. TXO then paid Virginia Crews $6,000 to convey its interest in the site to TXO, without informing Alliance.

== Trial court decision ==
TXO originally filed a complaint against Alliance to remove a cloud on title on the oil and gas rights for the site. When this was decided in Alliance's favor, Alliance filed a counterclaim for slander of title that went before a jury. Alliance argued that TXO knew Alliance had a good title, that TXO had acted in bad faith to renegotiate the agreement, that the amount of royalties TXO had attempted to reduce was substantial, and that TXO had engaged in similar activities elsewhere. The jury awarded Alliance $19,000 in compensatory damages, based on their costs to defend against TXO's original complaint, and $10 million in punitive damages.

== Appeals ==
=== West Virginia Supreme Court of Appeals ===
On appeal, the West Virginia Supreme Court of Appeals upheld the judgment. TXO argued that no cause of action for slander of title existed or had been established, that West Virginia Rules of Evidence had been violated by introducing testimony of lawyers involved in litigation against TXO elsewhere, and that the award of $10 million violated the Due Process Clause, citing Pacific Mutual Life Ins. Co. v. Haslip, 499 U.S. 1. Alliance argued that this constitutional objection had been waived, that TXO's misconduct was particularly egregious, and that the award was not excessive. The Court's decision relied heavily on their previous decision in Garnes v. Fleming Landfill, Inc., which was considered by the U.S. Supreme Court but remanded to the W.V. Supreme Court of Appeals after the Haslip decision. In this decision, they set forth seven standards for future determination of punitive damages: the relation between the punitive and actual damages, the reprehensibility and time involvement of the defendant's conduct, any potential profit the defendant earned from their conduct, the amount of compensatory damages, the wealth of the defendant, the costs of litigation, and any other civil or criminal sanctions already imposed for the same conduct.

The Court stated that "The type of fraudulent action intentionally undertaken by TXO in this case could potentially cause millions of dollars in damages to other victims. As for the reprehensibility of TXO's conduct, we can say no more than we have already said, and we believe the jury's verdict says more than we could say in an opinion twice this length. Just as important, an award of this magnitude is necessary to discourage TXO from continuing its pattern and practice of fraud, trickery and deceit." Further, the Court stated that because TXO was not a "really stupid" negligent defendant, but a "really mean" intentional wrongdoer, they got what they deserved. This statement was widely criticized by commentators.

=== Supreme Court ===
==== Plurality ====
The Supreme Court of the United States then granted certiorari and, in the 1993 decision, upheld the Court of Appeals' judgment. Both parties attempted to establish a test for punitive damages, with TXO favoring a "heightened scrutiny" standard and Alliance favoring a "rational basis" standard. The Court was not persuaded by either argument, with Justice Stevens' decision reiterating a statement made in the Haslip decision: "We need not, and indeed we cannot, draw a mathematical bright line between the constitutionally acceptable and the constitutionally unacceptable that would fit every case. We can say, however, that [a] general concer[n] of reasonableness . . . properly enter[s] into the constitutional calculus." 499 U. S., at 18. Referring to Haslip once again, Stevens said that "it is with this concern for reasonableness in mind that we turn to petitioner's argument that the punitive award in this case was so "grossly excessive" as to violate the substantive component of the Due Process Clause." The plurality determined that the only relevant constitutional question was whether the award was accomplished with procedural fairness. In upholding the original ruling, the plurality determined that the West Virginia Supreme Court of Appeals was correct in its application of the Garnes case to determine the "reasonableness" of the award.

==== Concurrence ====
Justice Kennedy's concurrence agreed that the West Virginia courts had followed due process requirements. However, he argued that the alternative "reasonableness" standard proposed by the plurality was flawed, as determining whether an award is "grossly excessive" requires some basis for determination. Without a baseline to compare against, the proposed standard would not impose any practical limits on jury excess. Thus, he suggested that the inquiries for future appeals should focus on whether the jury was motivated by "bias, passion, or prejudice" rather than a concern for deterrence and retribution, disregarding the size of the award. If a rational jury provided the same information that was presented at trial could reasonably reach the same verdict and punitive damages award, Kennedy would uphold it against a substantive due process argument.

Justice Scalia concurred separately, joined by Justice Thomas, disagreeing with the plurality's reasoning on substantive due process. Unlike Kennedy, he believed that the size of an award cannot raise a substantive due process argument. As constitutional literalists, they did not find a substantive right to not be subjected to excessive fines in the 5th or 14th Amendments. Scalia noted that the Haslip decision had indicated that a 4 to 1 ratio between punitive and compensatory damages was close to the line, and that the 526-to-1 ratio in TXO would - if applied consistently - dispose of the vast majority of due process challenges to punitive damages. Indeed, after the Haslip decision, lower courts throughout the country had attempted to adhere to the 4-to-1 ratio rule implied by it.

==== Dissent ====
Justice O'Connor, joined by Justices White and Souter, dissented from the plurality, calling the "no-mathematical-bright-line" decision a "cop-out" and quoting Justice Potter Stewart's famous statement "I know it when I see it" for comparison. She had been the lone dissenter in the Haslip case, and argued that the guidance to the jury and the post-trial review were both less sufficient in TXO than they had been in Haslip. Like Kennedy, O'Connor was concerned that a jury with the power to issue such large awards could be influenced by bias, passion, or prejudice, especially when not given proper instructions. She also called for a comparison of this award to others upheld against other defendants in West Virginia, and to other similar torts in all jurisdictions. She found that the punitive damages award in TXO was twenty times greater than the largest amount ever handed out in West Virginia, ten times larger than the largest award for slander of title in any jurisdiction, and several times larger than the combined civil and criminal penalties for similar offenses. Further, she pointed out that the amount TXO stood to gain from their fraudulent actions was not mentioned to the jury, calling it "an after-the-fact rationalization invented by counsel to defend this startling award on appeal." She also criticized the majority for not providing any guidance to lower courts, and instead focusing on the specifics of the TXO case. Finally, she pointed out that the three largest awards ever upheld in West Virginia were against out-of-state defendants like TXO.

== Effects ==
As demonstrated by the divided opinions (a 3-justice plurality opinion joined in part by Kennedy, two separate concurrences, and a 3-justice dissent), TXO did not provide a tidy solution to any of the issues that were involved. Six justices agreed that TXO's behavior justified the significant fine, but a different set of 6 justices also found that the current standard for determining appropriate punitive damages is flawed, in one way or another.

The TXO decision was cited by mass media in claims that Americans are overly litigious and intensified calls for legislative tort reform in America. The American Tort Reform Association, which filed an amicus brief on behalf of TXO, claimed that punitive damage awards have grown too large in both size and frequency. Other groups representing American business and medicine claimed that such awards are unfair and adversely impact their international competitiveness, while consumer groups and plaintiffs' attorneys argue that these large awards are necessary for consumer and public protection.

The decision was also cited in claims that judicial regulation of punitive damages is inconsistent and should be replaced by national legislation. Although the TXO case involves a single large award, it has been cited by a number of lower courts in rejecting Due Process Clause arguments against multiple punitive damage awards, e.g. asbestos injury claims, even if the total amount awarded exceeds the defendant's ability to pay. Just a year later, the Liebeck v. McDonald's Restaurants case and its surrounding publicity amplified those calls for tort reform.

== See also ==
- List of United States Supreme Court cases, volume 509
- List of United States Supreme Court cases
