= Donselaar v Donselaar =

New Zealand law case

Donselaar v Donselaar [1982] 1 NZLR 97
- Court: Court of Appeal of New Zealand
- Full case name: John Donselaar v Andrew Donselaar
- Decided: 19 March 1982
- Citation: [1982] 1 NZLR 97
- Transcript: Court of Appeal judgment

Court membership
- Judges sitting: Cooke, Richardson, Somers JJ

Keywords
- exemplary damages

Donselaar v Donselaar [1982] 1 NZLR 97 is an often cited case in New Zealand regarding the legal issue of exemplary damages which held that although the ACC law prohibits damages for compensation, it does not exclude liability for punitive damages (exemplary damages).

== Background ==
The Donselaar family had a long running family dispute, culminating in John Donselaar trespassing on his brother Andrew's property. Not happy with his brother's trespass, Andrew hit his brother over the head with a hammer.

As a result, John sued Andrew for damages for this assault. As section 5 of the Accident Compensation Act [1972] prohibits suing for damages for physical injury, John sued for exemplary damages for the hammer attack.

== Decision ==
The court ruled that the Accident Compensation Act [1972] did not prohibit damages for exemplary damages. However the court rules that it was the conduct of the defendant was the deciding factor on whether special punishment of exemplary damages should be awarded, and not the nature of the plaintiff's injury. Which was unfortunate for the plaintiff here, as the court referred to him here as the "principal irritant", as amongst other things, he was trespassing at the time of the assault, and as a result, the court declined to make an award for exemplary damages to the plaintiff.
