= Helling v. McKinney =

- Supreme Court of the United States

Argued January 13, 1993 Decided June 18, 1993
- Full case name: Donald L. Helling, et al., Petitioners v. William McKinney.
- Citations: 509 U.S. 25 (more) 113 S.Ct. 2475, 125 L.Ed.2d 22
- Argument: Oral argument

Case history
- Prior: 959 F. 2d 853 (CA9 1992)

Holding
- Imprisoned people do not need to be actively experiencing injuries from their confinement conditions before challenging them as cruel and unusual punishment.

Court membership
- Chief Justice William Rehnquist Associate Justices Byron White · Harry Blackmun; John P. Stevens · Sandra Day O'Connor; Antonin Scalia · Anthony Kennedy; David Souter · Clarence Thomas

Case opinions
- Majority: White, joined by Rehnquist, Blackmun, Stevens, O'Connor, Kennedy, Souter
- Dissent: Thomas, joined by Scalia

Laws applied
- Amendment VIII

Helling v. McKinney, 509 U.S. 25 (1993), was a case in which the Supreme Court of the United States held that imprisoned people do not need to be actively experiencing injuries from their confinement conditions before challenging them as cruel and unusual punishment.

== Description ==
In this case, an imprisoned person alleged that prison officials had acted with "deliberate indifference" to the potential negative health effects of environmental tobacco smoke by allowing smoking in the prison. The court decided in his favor, saying he had stated a valid claim under the Eighth Amendment to the United States Constitution. The court rejected the argument by the prison officials that the "deliberate indifference" standard, which the Court had originally articulated in Estelle v. Gamble, only applied to the current health needs of prisoners, rather than risks to their future health.
