= Civil death =

Loss of all or almost all civil rights

Civil death (Latin: civiliter mortuus) is the loss of all or almost all civil rights by a person due to a conviction for a felony or due to an act (or multiple acts) by the government of a country that results in the loss of civil rights. It is usually inflicted on persons convicted of crimes against the state or adults determined by a court to be legally incompetent because of mental disability.

== Medieval Europe ==
In medieval Europe, felons lost all civil rights upon their conviction. This civil death often led to actual death, since anyone could kill and injure a felon with impunity. Under the Holy Roman Empire, a person declared civilly dead was referred to as vogelfrei ('free as a bird') and could even be killed since they were completely outside the law.

Historically outlawry, that is, declaring a person as an outlaw, was a common form of civil death.

Under early English common law a living person could under certain conditions be considered legally dead. The three categories generally recognized as resulting in civil death were profession ("monastery death"), abjuration, and banishment.

== United States ==
In the U.S., the disenfranchisement of individuals convicted of felonies has been called a form of civil death, as has being subjected to collateral consequences in general. For individuals charged with felonies and sentenced to life imprisonment, their time incarcerated acts as a specific and ongoing civil death.

Contemporary legal scholarship has expanded the definition of civil death in the United States to include not only individuals subject to life imprisonment (i.e. civil death which results from one singular legislative act of punishment) but also as the result of dozens of smaller losses of civil rights, autonomy, and access which individuals become subject to when they are charged with and convicted of felonies in the United States. In addition to losing the right to vote in federal and state elections, these individuals may lose their right to hold certain professional licences, may be subject to restrictions of movement, and may face immediate deportation if they have citizenship with another nation. By being subject to a wide variety of punishments and wider consequences undertaken at various levels of the civil and federal legal systems, victims of this civil death are also forced to address each loss individually, leading to a far higher barrier when they attempt to challenge or correct the loss of their rights.

== China ==
In China, the concept of civil death is embodied in the punishment known as "Deprivation of Political Rights" (Chinese: 剥夺政治权利), as outlined in Part One, Section 7 of the Criminal Law. The deprivation starts from the date on which imprisonment or criminal detention ends or from the date on which parole begins. Deprivation of political rights shall, as a matter of course, be in effect during the period in which the principal punishment is being executed. While the duration is usually issued between one to five years, Article 57 establishes that individuals sentenced to death or life imprisonment are automatically stripped of their political rights for life. If such sentences are later commuted to fixed-term imprisonment, the deprivation period is adjusted to a range of three to ten years. Political rights are defined in the Criminal Law as:

- the right to vote and to stand for election;
- the rights of freedom of speech, of the press, of assembly, of association, of procession, and of demonstration;
- the right to hold a position in a state organization; and
- the right to hold a leading position in any state-owned company, enterprise, institution or people's organization.

== See also ==
- Disfranchisement
- Loss of rights due to felony conviction
- Sex offender registries in the United States
- Social death
- Homo Sacer, a similar status in ancient Roman Law
