= John Hirst (criminal) =

British convicted murderer and campaigner for prisoners' rights

John Hirst (born 18 November 1950) is a British convicted murderer and campaigner for prisoners' rights.

== Early life ==
Sources vary on Hirst's place of birth - either Bradford or Hull. Hirst was placed by his divorced Latvian mother in a Barnardo's children's home, spending time subsequently in a series of foster homes.

== Criminal history ==
Hirst entered into crime, committing burglaries and robberies. He was sentenced to five years in Armley prison in April 1971 for arson, burglary and deception.

On 23 June 1979, Hirst killed Mrs. Bronia Burton, with whom he was lodging while out on parole from a two-year burglary sentence, in Burghfield, Berkshire, with an axe, hitting her seven times. Hirst said that Burton, with whom he had been lodging for eleven days, nagged him constantly when he went out, and he felt no remorse.

Hirst pleaded not guilty to murder, pleading guilty to manslaughter on the grounds of diminished responsibility. This plea was accepted by the prosecution who were led by Barbara Calvert QC. Mr Justice Purchis, sentencing Hirst to 15 years in prison said "I have no doubt you are an arrogant and dangerous person with a severe personality defect", adding "unfortunately, this is not suitable for treatment in a mental hospital".

While in prison, Hirst attacked a prison officer in 1989, leading him to be transferred to a high-security unit reserved for the most dangerous prisoners. The unit was visited by Stephen Shaw then of the Prison Reform Trust, who gave Hirst a copy of Prison Rules: A Working Guide, a PRT publication. Hirst used the book to successfully sue the prison governors over the disappearance of his personal property. Hirst submitted up to nine written complaints to his prison governors per day, also becoming Britain's most litigious prisoner, advising other prisoners and launching numerous lawsuits against the government and prisons.

In the event Hirst served 25 years due to violent behaviour and other offences while in prison, being released in 2004.

Some of Hirst's legal successes included a defeat of TV licensing (in 2006), his segregation in solitary confinement, a dangerous dogs charge (in 2008) and over prisoner voting rights.

Hirst has been diagnosed with Asperger's syndrome.

== Hirst v United Kingdom (No. 2) ==
Hirst sued in the High Court over the ban on prisoners' voting in elections in 2001, a case which he lost there, but subsequently won in the European Court of Human Rights in Hirst v United Kingdom (No 2) in 2004–2006. In 2010, the UK government announced that it would introduce legislation to comply with the ruling, giving some prisoners the right to vote, a move which caused much anger among Conservative and Labour MPs, who eventually rejected the ruling in the House of Commons.
