= Voting Eligibility (Prisoners) Bill =

Election law in the UK

The Voting Eligibility (Prisoners) Bill 2012 was a proposed Act of Parliament of the United Kingdom introduced to the House of Commons. The Bill deals with disenfranchisement of prisoners in the United Kingdom.

== Background ==
Following a ruling by the European Court of Human Rights, the United Kingdom government was tasked with amending the Representation of the People Act 1983 which contains the clauses forbidding serving prisoners from being able to cast votes in any elections. Even before 1983, prisoners in the UK weren't allowed to vote, which had been decided with the Forfeiture Act 1870.

On 10 December 2012, the Council of Europe advised that the United Kingdom could not continue with its 'blanket ban', observing that one of the available options in the draft bill would contravene the ruling against the UK.

Section 3 of the 1983 Act states that,

A convicted person during the time that he is detained in a penal institution in pursuance of his sentence or unlawfully at large when he would otherwise be so detained is legally incapable of voting at any parliamentary or local government election.

In its ruling Hirst v United Kingdom (No 2) the ECHR stated that "...the general...and indiscriminate disenfranchising of all serving prisoners....is incompatible with Article 3 of Protocol No 1", and that "[a]ny departure from the principle of universal suffrage risks undermining the democratic validity of the legislature thus elected and the laws which it promulgates".

== Proposals ==
The Voting Eligibility (Prisoners) Bill was drafted to give Members of Parliament three options on which to vote.

- Option 1 would retain the ban for prisoners jailed for over four years.
- Option 2 would retain the ban for prisoners jailed for over six months.
- Option 3 would retain the current ban with minor amendments. Even with these amendments, "[a]ll prisoners would be banned from voting if they were serving a custodial sentence"

A Joint Committee would be formed to consider the Bill and further options.

== Public debate ==
Amending the legislation has caused controversy in the United Kingdom. Prime Minister David Cameron said the idea made him feel "physically ill". Although Dominic Grieve, the Attorney General told a Select Committee that continuing the ban would keep the UK in breach of the Court's ruling David Cameron told the Commons that "no one should be in any doubt" that the law would not be changed.

In 2014, Conservative backbencher Christopher Chope introduced a private members bill to cement the ban on voting right in British law in defiance of the European Court's ruling.

== See also ==
- Civil liberties in the United Kingdom
