= Padilla v. Kentucky =

Padilla v. Commonwealth of Kentucky
- Supreme Court of the United States

Argued October 13, 2009 Decided March 31, 2010
- Full case name: Jose Padilla, Petitioner v. Commonwealth of Kentucky
- Docket no.: 08-651
- Citations: 559 U.S. 356 (more) 130 S. Ct. 1473; 176 L. Ed. 2d 284; 2010 U.S. LEXIS 2928; 78 U.S.L.W. 4235; 22 Fla. L. Weekly Fed. S 211

Case history
- Prior: State circuit court denied motion for post-conviction relief; state appeals court reversed; Kentucky Supreme Court reversed, affirming the trial court's denial of Padilla's motion, 253 S.W.3d 482 (Ky. 2008).
- Subsequent: Remanded to Kentucky courts

Holding
- The lawyer for a noncitizen, charged with a crime, has a constitutional obligation to tell the client if a guilty plea carries a risk that he will be deported.

Court membership
- Chief Justice John Roberts Associate Justices John P. Stevens · Antonin Scalia; Anthony Kennedy · Clarence Thomas; Ruth Bader Ginsburg · Stephen Breyer; Samuel Alito · Sonia Sotomayor

Case opinions
- Majority: Stevens, joined by Kennedy, Ginsburg, Breyer, Sotomayor
- Concurrence: Alito (in judgment), joined by Roberts
- Dissent: Scalia, joined by Thomas

Laws applied
- U.S. Const. amends. VI, XIV

Padilla v. Commonwealth of Kentucky, 559 U.S. 356 (2010), is a case in which the United States Supreme Court decided that criminal defense attorneys must advise noncitizen clients about the deportation risks of a guilty plea. The case extended the Supreme Court's prior decisions on criminal defendants' Sixth Amendment right to counsel to immigration consequences.

The duties of Counsel recognized in Padilla are broad. After Padilla, if the law is unambiguous, attorneys must advise their criminal clients that deportation will result from a conviction. Also, if the immigration consequences of a conviction are unclear or uncertain, attorneys must advise that deportation "may" result. Finally, attorneys must give their clients some advice about deportation: counsel cannot remain silent about immigration.

After Padilla, there has been significant litigation in the lower courts about whether attorneys are required to advise their criminal clients about other consequences of convictions.

== Background ==
José Padilla was born in Honduras in 1950. He later emigrated to the United States and became a lawful permanent resident. Padilla served in the US military during the Vietnam War and received an honorable discharge. As of 2010, Padilla had been a lawful resident in the United States for more than 40 years.

In 2001, Padilla was working as a commercial truck driver when he was arrested in Kentucky for transporting marijuana. His defense attorney told him that he "did not have to worry" about the conviction affecting his immigration status, so he pleaded guilty pursuant to a plea bargain. However, this advice was incorrect, as Padilla's deportation was virtually automatic. In 2004, Padilla filed a pro se motion for post-conviction relief, alleging that he had been given bad advice by his attorney.

The Sixth Amendment, as interpreted by the Court in Gideon v. Wainwright, guarantees criminal defendants legal counsel. Strickland v. Washington, a subsequent decision, further requires that defendants receive effective counsel.

Padilla argued that the bad advice he had been given was ineffective assistance of counsel, and that he would have gone to trial if his attorney had advised him of the immigration consequences of his plea agreement. Padilla won his case in the Kentucky Appellate Court, but the Commonwealth requested the Kentucky Supreme Court hear the case on discretionary review. According to the state supreme court, "collateral consequences are outside the scope of the representation required by the Sixth Amendment", and even affirmative misadvice about deportation provides no grounds for relief under Strickland.

As the Supreme Court agreed to hear it, the case posed two questions: (1) whether the mandatory deportation that results from a guilty plea to trafficking in marijuana is a "collateral consequence" and counsel is thereby relieved of an affirmative duty to advise his client about it in accordance with the guarantees of the Sixth Amendment; and, (2) assuming deportation is a "collateral consequence", whether counsel's gross misadvice about deportation constitutes a ground for setting aside a guilty plea that is induced by that advice. Ultimately, the Court re-framed the case in a way that made the collateral consequences doctrine irrelevant.

== Decision ==
The Supreme Court reversed the Kentucky Supreme Court's decision. The Supreme Court held that criminal defense attorneys are duty-bound to inform clients of the risk of deportation under three circumstances. Firstly, if the law is unambiguous, attorneys must advise their criminal clients that deportation will result from a conviction. Secondly, if the immigration consequences of a conviction are unclear or uncertain, attorneys must advise that deportation may result. Thirdly, attorneys must give their clients some advice about deportation; counsel cannot remain silent about immigration consequences.

=== Majority opinion ===
Writing for the Court, Justice John Paul Stevens began his analysis by tracing the history of federal immigration law and its close historical connection between a criminal conviction and deportation: ninety years ago, deportation occurred only for a narrow class of crimes and even then was discretionary. Over time, that discretion has been limited, and the class of deportable offenses has expanded. Now, a conviction for drug trafficking means removal is "practically inevitable".

The court declined to apply the direct/collateral consequences reasoning of the state court to immigration consequences because deportation is "uniquely difficult to classify as either a direct or collateral consequence". The court found it significant that adverse immigration consequences are a "particularly severe penalty" and impact a large number of cases, often leaving non-citizens with no recourse. Acknowledging that removal proceedings are civil in nature, deportation has been closely connected to the criminal process for nearly a century. Given the connection, it was difficult for the Court to classify deportation as a direct or collateral consequence. Regardless of whether the collateral consequences rule is an appropriate way of analyzing ineffectiveness cases, a question that the Court did not decide, the Court found it "ill-suited" to evaluating Padilla's deportation-related claim.

The court thus concluded that advice about deportation is "not categorically removed from the ambit of the Sixth Amendment right to counsel" and so applied Strickland's two-pronged test to Padilla's claim.

The bulk of the Court's analysis focused on the attorney's performance under Strickland. In analyzing the performance prong, the Court first examined professional norms and practices. It determined that the weight of current professional norms indicates that attorneys must advise their clients of the risk of deportation. Specifically, professional standards promulgated by the American Bar Association, the National Legal Aid and Defender Association, the Justice Department, and legal scholars all indicate that an attorney must advise his or her client of the risk. Moreover, avoiding deportation may be more important to the client than even averting the maximum sentence of incarceration. Given the gravity of deportation, the Court's expectation was that counsel would consult available practice guides and advise his or her client accordingly.

Moving beyond the facts of Jose Padilla's situation, the Court decided two further issues. The Court decided counsel may not remain silent but must provide some advice about immigration consequences. The Court reasoned that a contrary holding would invite attorneys to offer no advice about circumstances that might lead to their clients' exile.

Given this seriousness and the minimal duty imposed, offering clients no advice would be unconscionable and a violation of the Sixth Amendment guarantee. The Court mitigated this newly imposed duty somewhat by holding that when the immigration consequences are not certain and clear, a criminal defense attorney must simply advise the client that a conviction may affect the client's immigration status.

The Court reasoned that immigration law is a separate legal field that is complex and may be unfamiliar to criminal defense attorneys. The Court acknowledged Justice Alito's point that the deportation consequences of a criminal conviction are often unclear but reasoned that this complexity affected the scope and nature of counsel's advice, rather than obviating the duty to give advice.

=== Concurrence ===
Concurring in the judgment, Justice Alito largely agreed with the Court's result but took issue with the breadth of its holding. Alito agreed with the Court that affirmative misadvice gives rise to a valid claim under Strickland, reasoning that requiring attorneys to know the limits of their own expertise is not too high a standard. Alito also concurred that the Sixth Amendment requires counsel to say when a conviction may trigger deportation but would apply that same, limited requirement regardless of the clarity of the law.

Alito parted company with the majority’s attempt to distinguish between immigration consequences that are "succinct, clear, and explicit" and those that are "not... straightforward". He pointed out with numerous examples that determining the correct advice about immigration consequences is often complex.

Conversely, to an attorney unversed in immigration law, a single statute read in isolation may seem to resolve an issue, but a careful attorney would need to know how the statute had been interpreted by courts. Also, immigration practice guides indicate that it is not easy to tell whether a conviction will trigger removal. In sum, Alito thought that immigration law was too complex to be easily reduced to the majority's clear/unclear dichotomy.

=== Dissenting opinion ===
Justice Scalia wrote a dissenting opinion. Scalia agreed with Justice Alito's reasoning about the complexity of immigration law, but concluded that the Sixth Amendment's text and the Court's decisions limit the amount of advice counsel is under a duty to provide. Scalia also saw no logical stopping point to a holding that requires counsel to give advice about collateral consequences of a conviction. Scalia quoted Alito's list of collateral consequences that might be included in an expansive duty to inform, including civil commitment, government benefits, and professional licenses. Finally, Scalia objected to constitutionalizing an issue that might be better handled through legislation.

== Impact ==
=== Immigration consequences ===
The biggest direct impact of the Padilla decision is that criminal defense attorneys must advise their non-citizen clients about the immigration consequences of a guilty plea. In cases for which the law is unclear, lawyers do not have to do significant legal research, but may simply say that a conviction may lead to the client's deportation. The Supreme Court noted that even as the Supreme Court of Kentucky denied Padilla's claim based on the collateral consequence of deportation, the Commonwealth amended its plea bargain agreement forms to include deportation as a possible outcome.

The case along with the 2015 United States Court of Appeals for the First Circuit Case No. 13-1994 Castaneda v. Souza with its companion cases Castaneda v. Souza and Gordon v Johnson, which allowed bail for immigrants previously held in mandatory detention, greatly expanded the rights of immigrants caught within the deportation and removal system.

=== Other collateral consequences ===
Padilla may have effects on ineffectiveness claims regarding other collateral consequences. In his concurring opinion, Justice Alito lists "civil commitment, civil forfeiture, the loss of the right to vote, disqualification from public benefits, ineligibility to possess firearms, dishonorable discharge from the Armed Forces, and loss of business or professional licenses" as areas where the Court's holding in Padilla may be extended.
