= Collateral consequence =

Unintended effects of an action or inaction

Collateral consequences are the effects of a given action or inaction that are unintended, unknown, or at least not explicit. A collateral consequence may simply be one that is beyond the scope of consideration.

These are as opposed to direct consequences, which stem from the action in an anticipated manner.

For example, picture a person starting a farm. The direct consequences of this farm's development are revenue for the farmer, produce for consumers, etc. The collateral consequences are runoff from the farm being distributed in the nearby river, or enhanced absorption of carbon dioxide by the new foliage. Collateral consequences, in this example, are related to the economic concept of externalities.

The distinction between direct and collateral consequences is perhaps most important in the area of criminal law and sentencing, where an effort to take the collateral consequences of criminal charges into account when meting out punishment is underway.

== See also ==
- Unintended consequence
