= List of United States Supreme Court cases, volume 509 =

This is a list of all United States Supreme Court cases from volume 509 of the United States Reports:

Case name	Citation	Date decided
Zobrest v. Catalina Foothills School Dist.	509 U.S. 1	1993
Helling v. McKinney	509 U.S. 25	1993
Reno v. Catholic Social Services, Inc.	509 U.S. 43	1993
Harper v. Virginia Dept. of Taxation	509 U.S. 86	1993
When this Court applies a rule of federal law to the parties before it, that rule is the controlling interpretation of federal law and must be given full retroactive effect in all cases still open on direct review and as to all events, regardless of whether such events predate or postdate the announcement of the rule.
Darby v. Cisneros	509 U.S. 137	1993
Sale v. Haitian Centers Council, Inc.	509 U.S. 155	1993
Brooke Group Ltd. v. Brown & Williamson Tobacco Corp.	509 U.S. 209	1993
Buckley v. Fitzsimmons	509 U.S. 259	1993
Shalala v. Schaefer	509 U.S. 292	1993
The 30-day period for filing an application for Equal Access to Justice Act fees begins immediately upon expiration of the time for appeal of a remand order issued pursuant to sentence four of 42 U.S.C. § 405(g).
Heller v. Doe	509 U.S. 312	1993
People with mental disabilities are not a suspect class, so laws targeting them are subject to rational basis review.
Johnson v. Texas	509 U.S. 350	1993
Godinez v. Moran	509 U.S. 389	1993
United States v. Edge Broadcasting Co.	509 U.S. 418	1993
TXO Production Corp. v. Alliance Resources Corp.	509 U.S. 443	1993
St. Mary's Honor Center v. Hicks	509 U.S. 502	1993
Alexander v. United States	509 U.S. 544	1993
The seizure and destruction of expressive materials found to be criminally obscene is not a prior restraint on future protected expression.
Daubert v. Merrell Dow Pharmaceuticals, Inc.	509 U.S. 579	1993
Austin v. United States	509 U.S. 602	1993
Shaw v. Reno	509 U.S. 630	1993
United States v. Dixon	509 U.S. 688	1993
Hartford Fire Ins. Co. v. California	509 U.S. 764	1993
Delo v. Blair	509 U.S. 823	1993
Staying a state's execution order pending an evidentiary hearing based on an actual innocence claim is an abuse of discretion under Herrera v. Collins.
