= Collateral consequences of criminal conviction =

Civil penalties following a conviction

Collateral consequences of criminal conviction are the additional civil state penalties, mandated by statute, that attach to a criminal conviction. They are not part of the direct consequences of criminal conviction, such as prison, fines, or probation. They are the further civil actions by the state that are triggered as a consequence of the conviction. In some jurisdictions, a judge, finding a defendant guilty of a crime, can order that no conviction be recorded, thereby relieving the person of the collateral consequences of a criminal conviction.

== Introduction ==
Beyond the terms of the sentence, a defendant can experience additional state actions that are considered by the state to be collateral consequences such as: disenfranchisement (in some countries this may be separately meted out), disentitlement of education loans (for drug charges in the United States), loss of a professional license, or eviction from public housing. These consequences are not imposed directly by the judge, and are beyond the terms of a sentence itself for the actual crime. Instead, they are civil state actions and are referred to as collateral consequences. In most jurisdictions, being charged with a crime can trigger state civil action in the form of an investigation to determine if the charges trigger the civil statutes that attach to the criminal charges. An example would be criminal charges that can trigger deportation, or the revocation of a professional license, such as a medical, nursing, or pharmacist license. Being subject to collateral consequences has been called a form of civil death.

== Collateral consequences in Australia ==
In general, the collateral consequences of a criminal conviction are similar to those in other countries. A non-citizen who fails the character requirements of the Department of Immigration and Border Protection may:

- be denied entry or re-entry into Australia, if outside Australia
- have their visa cancelled, requiring them to leave or to be removed from Australia.

Persons who are serving prison terms may be disqualified to vote. Federally, prisoners 18 years and over serving a full time prison sentence of less than three years must vote in federal elections. There are varying laws for prisoners' eligibility to vote in state or territory elections:

- In the Australian Capital Territory and South Australia, all prisoners are eligible.
- In Victoria, prisoners must be serving a sentence of less than five years to be eligible.
- In Queensland, Tasmania and the Northern Territory, prisoners must be serving a sentence of less than three years to be eligible.
- In New South Wales and Western Australia, prisoners must be serving a sentence of less than one year to be eligible.

Despite the relatively permissive laws allowing those serving short sentences to vote, voter turnout amongst prisoners is low. In 2010, a Victorian government review found only 26% of prisoners serving less than three year sentences were enrolled, despite them being eligible and legally obliged to do so. At the 2013 federal election, only 2 prisoners at the Silverwater Correctional Centre voted according to the general manager of the prison. In some jurisdictions, a judge, finding a person guilty of an offence, can order that no conviction be recorded, thereby relieving the person of the collateral and social consequences of a conviction.

== Collateral consequences in Canada ==
Collateral consequences were defined by Justice Wagner of the Supreme Court of Canada in R v Pham in 2013. Justice Wagner defined collateral consequences broadly, stating that they are "any consequences for the impact of the sentence on the particular offender." He ruled that judges can take collateral consequences into account during the sentencing procedure, so long as the sentence they impose is proportionate and they do not impose "inappropriate or artificial sentences" that circumvent "Parliament's will". Justice Wagner also stated that, at least in the case of collateral consequences involving immigration, appellate courts can intervene to change a sentence if the trial judge was not aware that such a consequence would arise as a result of his or her sentence.

The issue arose in Pham because under Canadian federal law, a resident of Canada who is not a citizen can be removed from Canada if the person is convicted of certain types of criminal offences. The removal process is not part of the sentence for the criminal offence, and therefore is a collateral consequence. Once a non-resident person is required to leave Canada because of a criminal conviction, they are not entitled to come back to Canada unless they meet the rehabilitation requirements. A non-resident who is convicted of an offence carrying a life sentence is normally barred from Canada for life, if released from incarceration.

R. v. Pham involved an offender whose sentence would have made him ineligible to appeal his deportation if it were not reduced in length by one day. Neither the sentencing judge nor the offender's lawyers were aware of the potential immigration consequences at the time of sentencing. At the Supreme Court, Justice Wagner concluded that, had the sentencing judge been aware of the collateral consequences, he or she would have imposed a sentence that avoided them. He therefore reduced the length of the offender's sentence by one day.

Following the Supreme Court's decision in R. v. Pham, lower courts extended its applicability to other collateral consequences. For example, courts have held that stigma or the loss of employment following a conviction to be collateral consequences that can be taken into account during sentencing. The British Columbia Court of Appeal also ruled that a "lifetime ban...from income and disability assistance as a result of conviction..." is a collateral consequence and that a more lenient sentence may be imposed to avoid such a consequence.

== Collateral consequences in New Zealand ==
Collateral consequences are generally, more or less, similar to those in the countries mentioned earlier. Any non-citizen to whom the following applies will generally not be allowed to reside in or visit New Zealand:

1. deportation from any country
2. a prison sentence, or series of such sentences, adding up to 5 or more years
3. in the past 10 years, a sentence of imprisonment of 12 or more months (other than a sentence covered in (2) above).

== Collateral consequences in the United Kingdom ==
Such consequences can include:

- loss of professional licence (particularly within occupations covered by the Common Law Police Disclosure policy)
- deportation (if not a citizen)
- loss of ability to obtain a heavy goods vehicle or passenger carrying vehicle licence after a conviction for some serious driving offences, particularly those causing death
- loss of ability to legally possess a firearm

== Collateral consequences in the United States ==
=== Outline of collateral consequences ===
In the United States, collateral consequences can include loss or restriction of a professional license, ineligibility for public funds including welfare benefits and student loans, loss of voting rights, ineligibility for jury duty, and deportation for immigrants, including those who, while not American citizens, hold permanent resident status.

In general, all states impose such consequences except in situations where criminal charges are dropped or dismissed. In all jurisdictions throughout the U.S., judges are not obligated to warn of these collateral consequences upon a finding of guilt by trial, or prior to an admission of guilt by plea agreement, except as regards deportation. Deportation has been made an exception by the Supreme Court in Padilla v. Commonwealth of Kentucky.

There are few legal remedies available for these collateral consequences; however, some governmental organizations discouraged actions that would cause unfairly harsh collateral consequences. For example, the Equal Employment Opportunity Commission (EEOC) urges human resources managers not to automatically exclude all ex-convicts from employment consideration, particularly if they are members of minorities with disproportionate incarceration rates.

=== Efforts to include collateral consequences in sentencing in the United States ===
The Supreme Court of the United States addressed collateral consequences of criminal convictions as early as 1984. In Strickland v. Washington, the Court explored ineffective assistance of counsel with respect to collateral consequences of criminal convictions. Strickland encouraged but did not mandate consideration of collateral consequences. Some claim that structural incentives exist for lawyers to not elicit information relevant to collateral consequences because doing so may prolong a case; others note that no attorney or judge could predict any and all collateral consequences of a criminal conviction. Since Strickland did not require an analysis of collateral consequences, they generally are not regarded as cause to overturn criminal convictions. However, some argue that the Constitution should require consideration of collateral consequences.

Most states do not accord equal legal effect to the collateral consequences of criminal convictions. For example, in New York the consideration of certain collateral consequences is merely discretionary, while the elucidation of direct consequences is required. For instance, in People v. Peque, New York's highest court overruled the portion of its prior ruling in People v. Ford that "a court's failure to advise a defendant of potential deportation never affects the validity of the defendant's plea" but still held that a trial court had different duties with regard to direct versus collateral consequences of guilty pleas. Likewise, the Kentucky Supreme Court in Commonwealth v. Fuartado, 170 S.W.3d 384 (Ky. 2005) held that the failure of defense counsel to advise a defendant of potential deportation did not give rise to a claim of ineffective assistance of counsel.

In 2004, the Public Defender Service of the District of Columbia assembled a document outlining some collateral consequences. In May 2005, Chief Judge Judith S. Kaye of the New York State Court of Appeals organized the Partners in Justice Colloquium to address the issue of collateral consequences. Judge Kaye formed a working group which, in partnership with the Lawyering in the Digital Age Clinic at the Columbia University Law School, created a site that, for the first time, collects academic works, court opinions, and professionals' resources (by virtue of a message board and database) in one place. The Columbia University Law School in collaboration with the Columbia Center for New Media Teaching and Learning developed and a Collateral Consequences Calculator for looking up and comparing collateral consequences of criminal charges in New York State.

== See also ==
- American entry into Canada by land § Criminal inadmissibility
- Disfranchisement § Based on criminal conviction
- Employment discrimination against persons with criminal records in the United States
- Loss of rights due to conviction for criminal offense
- Padilla v. Commonwealth of Kentucky
- Personal Responsibility and Work Opportunity Act § Ban on food stamps for drug felons
