= Disfranchisement =

Revocation of the right of suffrage

Disfranchisement or disenfranchisement, which is the term that has become more common since 1982, is a wider term for voter disqualification and voter suppression, or restriction of suffrage of a person or group of people. Disfranchisement has been defined as the revocation of power or control of a particular individual, community, or being to the natural amenity they have; that is to deprive of a franchise, of a legal right, of some social privilege or inherent immunity. Disfranchisement may be accomplished explicitly by law or implicitly through requirements applied in a discriminatory fashion, through intimidation, or by placing unreasonable requirements on voters for registration or voting. Beyond barriers to voting, participation in public office may also have high barriers to entry and can serve to disenfranchise a representative democracy and political movements

== Restriction to Vote Based on Gender ==
Women used to be disfranchised. Feminism has successfully managed to claim voting rights in most countries, though material or social disfranchement continues widely.

== Restriction to Vote Based on Age ==
Most countries or regions set a minimum voting age, and only enfranchise citizens older than this age. The most common voting age is 18, though some countries such as Austria have minimum voting ages set as young as 16 Other countries such as Singapore, set their voting age at "not less than 21 years of age". The Kingdom of Tonga , Sultanate of Oman , and the Lebanese Republic also set the legal age of voting at 21. The United States modified its voting age from 21 to 18 through ratification of the 26th amendment to the U.S. Constitution on July 1, 1971. The amendment states "The right of citizens of the United States, who are eighteen years of age or older, to vote shall not be denied or abridged by the United States or by any State on account of age".

== Restriction to Vote Based on Residence or Ethnicity, By Country ==
=== Australia ===
Voting in Australia is compulsory for resident citizens. Australian citizens who have been outside Australia for more than one but fewer than six years may excuse themselves from the requirement to vote in Australian elections while they remain outside Australia. Australian citizens living outside of Australia for more than six years automatically lose their right to vote, unless they re-register annually.

=== Canada ===
Residency requirements for Canadian citizens were ruled unconstitutional by the Supreme Court of Canada in 2019. All Canadian citizens can vote in Canadian elections.

=== Chile ===
Chileans living abroad may vote in presidential elections and presidential primaries, but not in elections to the national legislature or for regional government officials. The right to vote was extended to Chileans abroad in 2014 by Law No. 20.748; the bill was sponsored by Senators Isabel Allende Bussi, Soledad Alvear, Hernán Larraían Fernández and Patricio Walker Prieto. The law also allowed Chileans residing abroad to vote in the 2020 national plebiscite. Of nearly 60,000 registered overseas voters, 30,912 Chileans from 65 countries participated in the referendum.

=== Denmark ===
Citizens of Denmark are in general not allowed to vote in Danish elections if they reside outside the country for more than two years. Danish citizens that reside permanently outside Denmark lose their right to vote.

=== India ===
Non-resident Indian citizens may vote from abroad by applying to be registered as non-resident electors as long as they have not obtained citizenship in another country. They must be "absent from the country owing to employment, education etc, [have] not acquired citizenship of any other country and are otherwise eligible to be registered as a voter in the address mentioned in your passport."

=== Norway ===
The Norwegian constitution of 1814, paragraph 53, stated that anyone being in service of another power, buying or selling votes, or being convicted to forced labor would be disfranchised. Paragraph 53 was repealed by the parliament (Storting) in June 2022. Citizens residing outside Norway for more than 10 years may not vote unless they make an application.

==== Svalbard ====
The 2023 election for the Longyearbyen Community Council was held under new rules imposed by the Norwegian government, wherein voters had to have Norwegian citizenship or have lived in mainland Norway for 3 years. These rules disenfranchised an estimated one-third of the voter roll compared to the previous election in 2019, including almost the entire community of non-Norwegians living in the town. The previous rules allowed anyone who had resided on Svalbard itself for 3 years to vote.

=== United Kingdom ===
British citizens are allowed to vote at home with no time limit. Until 2024, they were not allowed to vote in UK General Elections or referendums if they had resided outside the country for more than 15 years.

In February 2018, the Overseas Electors Bill was presented to Parliament, with a view to abolishing the 15-year limit and the requirement to have registered to vote before leaving the UK. The Bill, which ran out of time due to the 2019 general election, would have granted all British expatriates the unlimited right to vote, as long as they have lived in the UK at some point in their lives. The issue became a hotly debated topic among British expatriates who have lived in other EU Member States for more than 15 years and were thus barred from voting in the referendum on European Union membership, despite arguably being more affected by the result than British people living in the UK.

The Conservative Party pledged to abolish what they called the "arbitrary 15-year limit" in their manifesto for the 2019 general election, in which they were subsequently elected. The change was implemented in 2024.

=== United States ===
The 15th Amendment lithograph published by C. Rogan in 1871 shows U.S. President Grant at the center of a large table, signing the 15th Amendment, which establishes that the right to vote cannot be denied based on race, color, or previous condition of servitude. Also depicted are "E. Stanton, H. Greeley, S. Colfax, A. Lincoln, R. Small[s], U.S. Grant, Chs. Sumner, W.F. Seward, Lt. Gov. Revels, Fred. Douglass, B.J. [i.e., F.] Butler, [and] W.T. Sherman. Smaller images surrounding the main image are of African Americans serving in the military, attending school, farming, and voting. A portrait of John Brown is hanging on the wall in the background.

In the United States, the act of voting is foundational to democracy, and was held in such esteem by the nation's founders that the framers of the Declaration of Independence in 1776 referred to it as the “consent of the governed”, with its provisions later addressed in Article I, Section 4 of the Constitution, requiring the federal government to ensure every state maintains a "republican form of government" U.S. Const. art. I, § 4, cl. Since then, U.S. legislators have expanded access to the vote for its citizenry four additional times, removing such historical barriers as those based on race, color, or previous condition of servitude (15th Amendment), gender (19th Amendment), failure to pay poll tax (24th Amendment), and age, 18 years and older (26th Amendment). The Voting Rights Act of 1965 went further by abolishing such barriers to voting as literacy tests.

In Reynolds v. Sims (1964) the United States Supreme Court ruling referred to voting as fundamental, and underscored the act of voting as a lynchpin in the furtherance of all other other civil and political rights. Perhaps as a result of its significance, access to voting has recently come under fire in the U.S., with a marked increase in voter suppression tactics - or disfranchisement - since 2020.

==== Possible Factors Driving Disfranchisement ====
In attempting to define what causes groups, governments or other entities to desire the limiting of voting rights in the United States, "Hegelian Dialectical Analysis of U.S. Voting Laws" describes voter suppression or disfranchisement as "... a recurring backlash against expanding voting rights, illustrating how formal legal protections can coexist with barriers to political participation" (pp. 108-109). The article goes on to mention historical tactics of disfranchisement as poll taxes, literacy tests, and intimidation used to prevent Black Americans from voting in Southern U.S. state during the 1950s and 1960s (p. 108).

Efforts made by Southern United States to prevent black citizens voting began after the end of the Reconstruction Era in 1877. They were enacted by Southern states at the turn of the 20th century. Their actions were designed to thwart the objective of the Fifteenth Amendment to the United States Constitution, enacted in 1870 to protect the suffrage of freedmen.

Democrats were alarmed by a late 19th-century alliance between Republicans and Populists that cost them some elections in North Carolina. Democrats added to previous efforts and achieved widespread disfranchisement by law: from 1890 to 1908, Southern state legislatures passed new constitutions, constitutional amendments, and laws that made voter registration and voting more difficult, especially when administered by white staff in a discriminatory way. They succeeded in disenfranchising most of the black citizens, as well as many poor whites in the South, and voter rolls dropped dramatically in each state. The Republican Party was nearly eliminated in the region for decades, and the Democrats established one-party control throughout the southern states.

In 1912, the Republican Party was split when Theodore Roosevelt ran against the party nominee, Taft. In the South by this time, the Republican Party had been hollowed out by the disfranchisement of African Americans, who were largely excluded from voting. Democrat Woodrow Wilson was elected as the first southern president since 1856. He was re-elected in 1916, in a much closer presidential contest. During his first term, Wilson satisfied the request of Southerners in his cabinet and instituted overt racial segregation throughout federal government workplaces, as well as racial discrimination in hiring. During World War I, American military forces were segregated, with black soldiers poorly trained and equipped.

Disfranchisement had far-reaching effects in Congress, where the Democratic Solid South enjoyed "about 25 extra seats in Congress for each decade between 1903 and 1953". (Note: Despite the South's excessive representation relative to voting population, the Great Migration resulted in Mississippi losing seats in Congress due to reapportionment following the 1930 and 1950 Censuses, while South Carolina and Alabama also lost Congressional seats after the former census and Arkansas following the latter.) Also, the Democratic dominance in the South meant that southern Senators and Representatives became entrenched in Congress. They favored seniority privileges in Congress, which became the standard by 1920, and Southerners controlled chairmanships of important committees, as well as leadership of the national Democratic Party. During the Great Depression, legislation establishing numerous national social programs were passed without the representation of African Americans, leading to gaps in program coverage and discrimination against them in operations. In addition, because black Southerners were not listed on local voter rolls, they were automatically excluded from serving in local courts. Juries were all white across the South.

Political enfranchisement expanded with passage of the Voting Rights Act of 1965, which authorized the federal government to monitor voter registration practices and elections where populations were historically underrepresented, and to enforce constitutional voting rights. The challenge to voting rights has continued into the 21st century, as shown by numerous court cases in 2016 alone, though attempts to restrict voting rights for political advantage have not been confined to the Southern states. Another method of seeking political advantage through the voting system is the gerrymandering of electoral boundaries, as was the case of North Carolina, which in January 2018 was declared by a federal court to be unconstitutional. Such cases are expected to reach the Supreme Court.

==== Recent ====
State governments have had the right to establish requirements for voters, voter registration, and conduct of elections. Since the founding of the nation, legislatures have gradually expanded the franchise (sometimes following federal constitutional amendments), from certain propertied white men to almost universal adult suffrage of age 18 and over, with the notable exclusion of people convicted of some crimes. Expansion of suffrage was made on the basis of lowering property requirements, granting suffrage to freedmen and restoring suffrage in some states to free people of color following the American Civil War, to women (except Native American women) in 1920, all Native Americans in 1924, and people over the age of 18 in the 1970s. Public interest groups focus on fighting disfranchisement in the United States amid rising concerns that new restrictions on voting are become more common.

==== Washington, D.C. ====
When the District of Columbia was established as the national capital, with lands contributed by Maryland and Virginia, its residents were not allowed to vote for local or federal representatives, in an effort to prevent the district from endangering the national government. Congress had a committee, appointed from among representatives elected to the House, that administered the city and district in lieu of local or state government. Residents did not vote for federal representatives who were appointed to oversee them.

In 1804, US Congress cancelled holding US presidential elections in Washington, D.C. or allowing residents to vote in them. Amendment 23 was passed by Congress and ratified in 1964 to restore the ability of District residents to vote in presidential elections.

In 1846, the portion of Washington, D.C. contributed from Virginia was "retrocessioned" (returned) to Virginia to protect slavery. People residing there (in what is now Alexandria), vote in local, Virginia and US elections.

Congress uses the same portion of the US Constitution to exclusively manage local and State level law for the citizens of Washington, D.C. and US military bases in the US. Until 1986, military personnel living on bases were considered to have special status as national representatives and prohibited from voting in elections where their bases were located. In 1986, Congress passed a law to enable US military personnel living on bases in the US to vote in local and state elections.

The position of non-voting delegate to Congress from the District was reestablished in 1971. The delegate cannot vote for bills before the House, nor floor votes, but may vote for some procedural and committee matters. In 1973, the District of Columbia Home Rule Act reestablished local government after a hundred-year gap, with regular local elections for mayor and other posts. They do not elect a US senator. People seeking standard representation for the 600,000 District of Columbia residents describe their status as being disfranchised in relation to the federal government. They do vote in presidential elections.

Until 2009, no other NATO (US military allies) or OECD country (US industrialized allies) had disfranchised citizens of their respective national capitals for national legislature elections. No US state prohibits residents of capitals from voting in state elections either, and their cities are contained within regular representative state and congressional districts.

==== Puerto Rico ====
U.S. federal law applies to Puerto Rico, although Puerto Rico is not a state. Due to the Federal Relations Act of 1950, all federal laws that are "not locally inapplicable" are automatically the law of the land in Puerto Rico (39 Stat. 954, 48 USCA 734). According to ex-Chief of the Puerto Rico Supreme Court Jose Trias Monge, "no federal law has ever been found to be locally inapplicable to Puerto Rico. Puerto Ricans were conscripted into the U.S. armed forces; they have fought in every war since they became U.S. citizens in 1917. Puerto Rico residents are subject to most U.S. taxes.

Contrary to common misconception, residents of Puerto Rico pay some U.S. federal taxes and contribute to Social Security, Medicare and other programs through payroll taxes. But, these American citizens have no Congressional representation nor do they vote in U.S. presidential elections.

Juan Torruella and other scholars argue that the U.S. national-electoral process is not a democracy due to issues related to lack of voting rights in Puerto Rico and representation. Both the Puerto Rican Independence Party and the New Progressive Party reject Commonwealth status. The remaining political organization, the Popular Democratic Party has officially stated that it favors fixing the remaining "deficits of democracy" that the Clinton and Bush administrations publicly recognized through Presidential Task Force Reports.

== Restriction to Vote Based on Disability ==
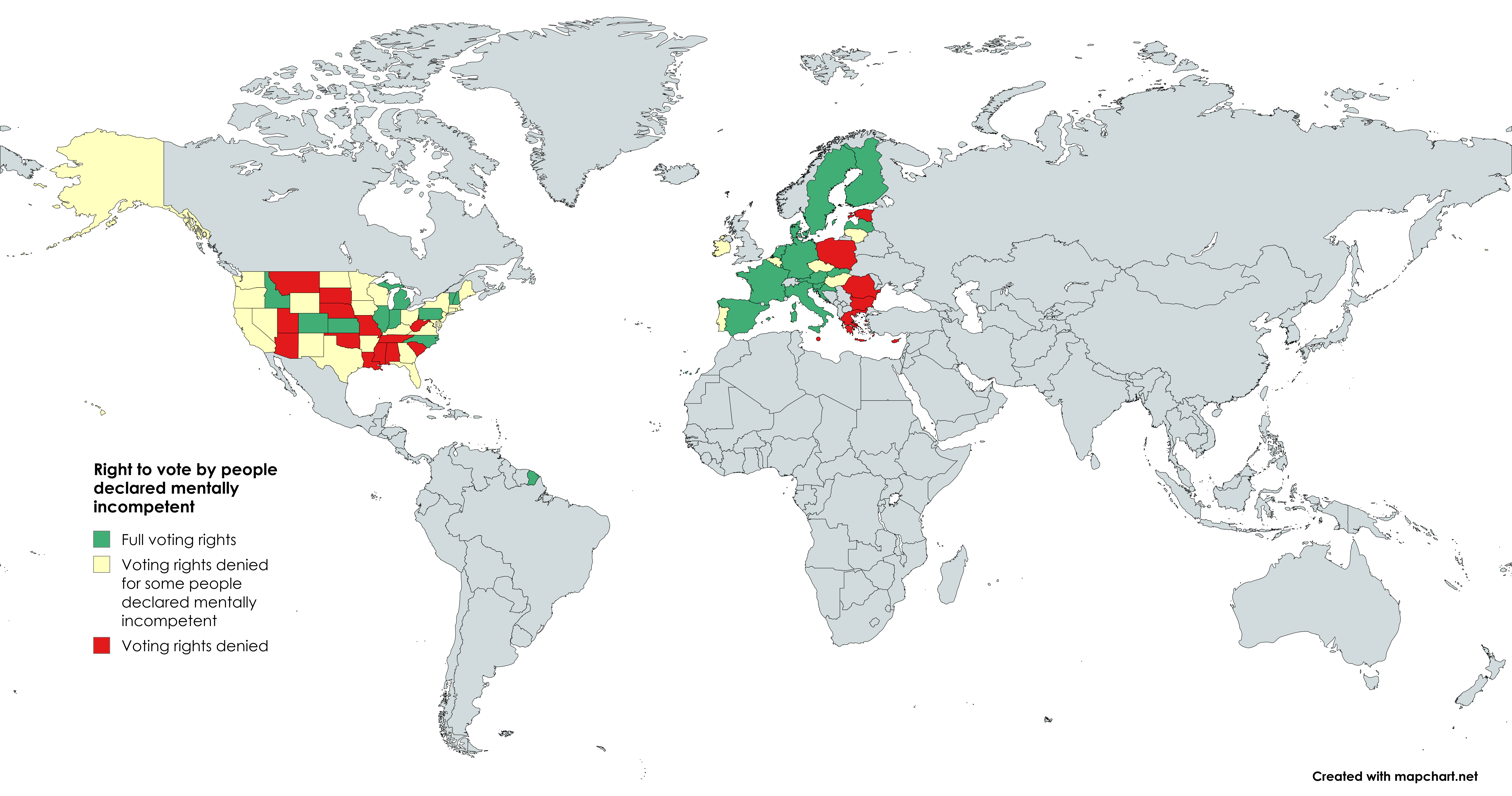
Right to vote by people declared mentally incompetent

Failure to make adequate provision for disabled electors can result in the selective disfranchisement of disabled people. Accessibility issues need to be considered in electoral law, voter registration, provisions for postal voting, the selection of polling stations, the physical equipment of those polling stations and the training of polling station staff. This disfranchisement may be a deliberate facet of electoral law, a consequence of a failure to consider the needs of anyone other than non-disabled electors, or an ongoing failure to respond to identified shortcomings in provision.

Note that in the case of disabled voters the issue may be actual loss of the franchise of someone previously able to vote, rather that ab initio disfranchisement. This may result from the transition from non-disabled to disabled, from changes in the effects of a disability, or changes in the accessibility of the electoral process.

=== Access Issues ===
Access presents special difficulties for disabled voters.

- Eligibility—Some nations restrict the franchise based on measured intellectual capacity. Potential voters with learning impairments, mental health issues, or neurological impairments may also find themselves barred from voting by law. These restrictions conflict with the United Nation's Office of the High Commissioner for Human Rights' Convention on the Rights of Persons with Disabilities.
- Registration—Registration difficulties may disfranchise disabled people through inadequate access provisions. For instance the United Kingdom (UK) Electoral Register is updated annually by a largely paper-based process; this provides poor accessibility to people with visual or learning impairments.
- Postal Voting—Postal voting for disabled voters requires ballots that are appropriate for visually impaired voters. The lack of a private, accessible voting booth makes postal voting inappropriate for others with specific physical and other disabilities.
- Polling Stations—Polling stations must offer the same physical accessibility that apply to other public facilities (parking, ramps, etc.) There must be sufficient polling stations to minimize queueing, which discriminates against those with mobility, pain or fatigue-based impairments. In 2005, 68% of polling stations in the UK were potentially inaccessible to disabled voters.
- Equipment—Polling stations must be clearly signposted. Low-to-the-ground polling booths and voting equipment must be available. Equipment must enable independent voting by visually and/or physically impaired voters. In 2005, 30% of UK polling stations were not in compliance with the law that requires a large print ballot and a physical template.
- Staff—Staff must understand the necessity of taking steps to ensure access and be able to show voters how to use equipment such as physical templates, as well as in "disability etiquette" to avoid patronizing these voters.

=== Campaigns for improvement ===
The disability rights movement in the UK has increased attention on electoral accessibility. Campaigns such as Scope's 'Polls Apart' have exposed violations at polling stations.

== Restriction to Vote Based on Criminal Conviction ==
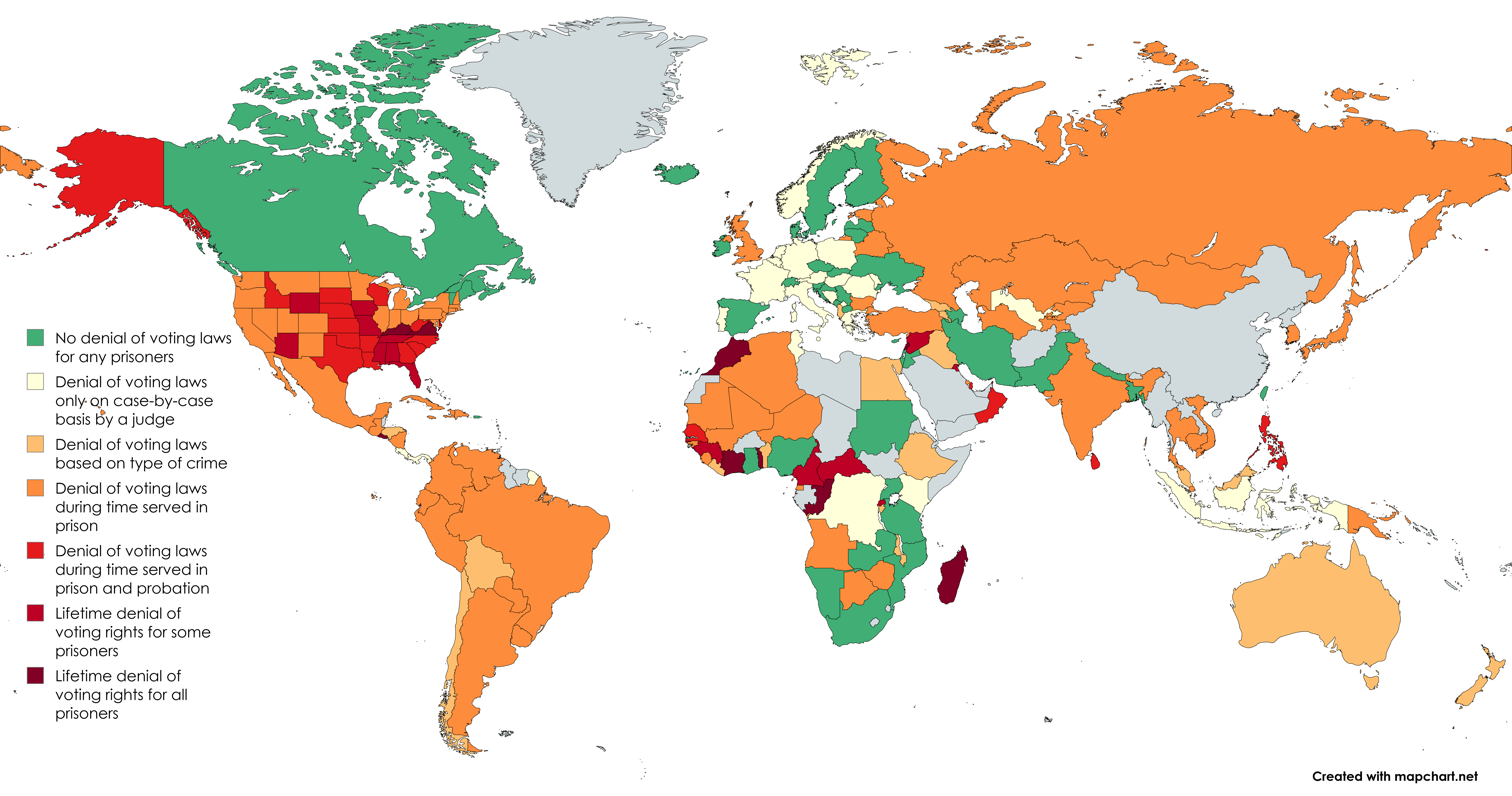
Felony disenfranchisement by country

The exclusion from voting of people otherwise eligible to vote due to conviction of a criminal offense is usually restricted to the more serious class of crimes. In some common law jurisdictions, those are felonies, hence the popular term felony disenfranchisement. In the US, those are generally crimes of incarceration for a duration of more than a year and/or a fine exceeding $1000. Jurisdictions vary as to whether they make such disfranchisement permanent, or restore suffrage after a person has served a sentence, or completed parole or probation. Felony disenfranchisement is one among the collateral consequences of criminal conviction and the loss of rights due to conviction for criminal offense.

Proponents of disenfranchising those convicted of crimes have argued that persons who commit felonies have "broken" the social contract, and have thereby given up their right to participate in a civil society. Some argue that felons have shown poor judgment, and that they should therefore not have a voice in the political decision-making process. Opponents have argued that such disfranchisement restricts and conflicts with principles of universal suffrage. Voter restrictions affect civic and communal participation in general. Opponents argue that felony disenfranchisement can create political incentives to skew criminal law in favor of disproportionately targeting groups who are political opponents of those who hold power.

In Western countries, felony disenfranchisement can be traced back to ancient Greek and Roman traditions: removal of the franchise was commonly imposed as part of the punishment on those convicted of "infamous" crimes, as part of their "civil death", whereby these persons would lose all rights and claim to property. Most medieval common law jurisdictions developed punishments that provided for some form of exclusion from the community for felons, ranging from execution on sight to exclusion from community processes.

=== Asia and Oceania ===
==== Australia ====
At Federation in Australia the Commonwealth Franchise Act 1902 denied the franchise to vote to anyone "attainted of treason, or who had been convicted and is under sentence or subject to be sentenced for any offence ... punishable by imprisonment for one year or longer".

In 1983 this disqualification was relaxed and prisoners serving a sentence for a crime punishable under the law for less than a maximum five years were allowed to vote. A further softening occurred in 1995 when the loss of voting rights was limited to those serving a sentence of five years or longer, although earlier that year the Keating government had been planning legislation to extend voting rights to all prisoners. Disenfranchisement does not continue after release from jail/prison.

The Howard government legislated in 2006 to ban all prisoners from voting. In 2007, the High Court of Australia in Roach v Electoral Commissioner found that the Australian constitution enshrined a limited right to vote, which meant that citizens serving relatively short prison sentences (generally less than three years) cannot be barred from voting. The threshold of three years or more sentence will only result in removal of a prisoner's right to vote in federal elections. Depending on the threshold of exclusion which is distinct in each state, a prisoner may be able to vote in either state elections or federal elections. For example, prisoners in New South Wales serving a sentence of longer than one year are not entitled to vote in state elections.

==== New Zealand ====
In New Zealand, people who are in prison are not entitled to enroll while they are in prison. Persons who are convicted of electoral offenses in the past three years cannot vote or stand for office. In November 2018, the New Zealand Supreme Court ruled that such restrictions are inconsistent with the nation's Bill of Rights.

On 25 June 2020 the Sixth Labour Government, with support from the Green Party and New Zealand First, passed legislation allowing prisoners serving sentences less than three years to vote in the 2020 New Zealand general election. The bill was opposed by the opposition National and ACT parties.

On 30 April 2025, Justice Minister Paul Goldsmith confirmed that the Sixth National Government would introduce legislation to reinstate a blanket ban on prisoners voting, describing it as a reversal of the previous Labour Government's "soft on crime" policy. Goldsmith said that the New Zealand Cabinet had decided to disregard a High Court ruling and recommendations from both the Electoral Commission and Waitangi Tribunal in 2024 and 2019 respectively that prisoners be allowed to vote.

==== India ====
Pursuant to Section 62 Subsection 5 of the Representation of the People Act, 1951, all convicted prisoners, detained prisoners and persons who are in police custody in India are disqualified from voting. This law has been challenged in court, most notably in the Praveen Kumar Chaudhary vs Election Commission of India case, but the plaintiffs were unsuccessful.

In addition pursuant to Section 62 Subsection 2 of the Representation of the People Act, 1951 a person is ineligible to vote if he or she is subjected to the disqualifications "referred to in section 16 of the Representation of the People Act, 1950 (43 of 1950)". Section 16 of the Representation of the People Act, 1950 refers to persons disqualified from registering in an electoral roll due to "corrupt practices and other offenses in connection with elections" (Please see Section 16 of the Representation of the People Act, 1950 and Section 62 Subsection 2 of the Representation of the People Act, 1951).

No person is ineligible to vote in India solely by reason of being on parole. For example, Shamsher Singh, who was convicted of the assassination of former Punjab Chief Minister Beant Singh, voted for the first time after he was released on parole while serving a sentence of life imprisonment (Please see news article dated February 20, 2022, from the Tribune News Service entitled, "Out on parole, Beant Singh murder convict Shamsher Singh votes for first time in Patiala").

==== Taiwan ====
In Taiwan the abrogation of political rights is a form of punishment used in sentencing, available only for some crimes or along with a sentence of death or imprisonment for life. Rights that are suspended in such a sentence is the right to qualifications for being a public official or becoming a candidate for public office (including those by elections, national exams, or direct appointment), But still have the right to vote.

==== China ====
In China, there is a similar punishment of Deprivation of Political Rights.

===== Hong Kong =====
On 8 December 2008, Leung Kwok Hung (Long Hair), member of Hong Kong's popularly elected Legislative Council (LegCo), and two prison inmates, successfully challenged disenfranchisement provisions in the LegCo electoral laws. The court found blanket disfranchisement of prisoners to be in violation of Article 26 of the Basic Law and Article 21 of the Bill of Rights and the denial to persons in custody of access to polling stations as against the law. The government introduced a bill to repeal the provisions of the law disenfranchising persons convicted of crimes (even those against the electoral system) as well as similar ones found in other electoral laws, and it made arrangements for polling stations to be set up at detention centers and prisons. LegCo passed the bill, and it took effect from 31 October 2009, even though no major elections were held until the middle of 2011.

=== Europe ===
In general, during the recent centuries, the European countries have increasingly made suffrage more accessible. This has included retaining disenfranchisement in fewer and fewer cases, including for criminal offenses. Moreover, most European states, including most of those outside the European Union, have ratified the European Convention on Human Rights, and thereby agreed to respect the decisions of the European Court of Human Rights. In the case Hirst v United Kingdom (No 2) the Court in 2005 found general rules for automatic disfranchisements resulting from convictions to be contrary to the European Convention on Human Rights. This ruling applied equally for prisoners and for ex-convicts. It did not exclude the possibility of disfranchisement as a consequence of deliberation in individual cases (such as that of Mohammed Bouyeri). The United Kingdom has not respected this Court opinion, although it is a signatory to the convention (see below).

==== Germany ====
In Germany, all convicts are allowed to vote while in prison unless the loss of the right to vote is part of the sentence; courts can only apply this sentence for specific "political" crimes (treason, high treason, electoral fraud, intimidation of voters, etc.) and for a duration of two to five years. All convicts sentenced to at least one year in prison automatically lose the right to be elected in public elections for a duration of five years, and lose all positions they held as a result of such an election. The described special court orders rarely ever occur, so that about 1-2 persons a year in all of Germany lose their right to vote this way.

==== Ireland ====
For elections in the Republic of Ireland, there is no disenfranchisement based on criminal conviction, and prisoners remain on the electoral register at their pre-imprisonment address. Prior to 2006, the grounds for postal voting did not include imprisonment, and hence those in prison on election day were in practice unable to vote, although those on temporary release could do so. In 2000 the High Court ruled that this breached the Constitution, and the government drafted a bill extending postal voting to prisoners on remand or serving sentences of less than six months. In 2001, the Supreme Court overturned the High Court ruling and the bill was withdrawn. Following the 2005 ECHR ruling in the Hirst case, the Electoral (Amendment) Act 2006 was passed to allow postal voting by all prisoners.

==== Italy ====
In Italy, the most serious offenses involve the loss of voting rights, while for less serious offenses disqualification the judge can choose if there will be some disenfranchisement. Recently, the decree Severino added a loss of only the right to stand for an election, against some offenders above a certain threshold of imprisonment: it operates administratively, with fixed duration and without intervention of the court. Many court actions have been presented, but the electoral disputes follows antiquated rules and the danger of causes seamless in terms of eligibility and incompatibility is very high, also at local level.

==== United Kingdom ====
The United Kingdom suspends suffrage of some but not all prisoners. For example, civil prisoners sentenced for nonpayment of fines can vote. Prior to the judgment in Hirst v United Kingdom (No 2), convicted prisoners had the right to vote in law but without assistance by prison authorities, voting was unavailable to them. In Hirst, the European Court of Human Rights ruled that First Protocol Article 3 requires Member States to proactively support voting by authorized inmates. In the UK, as of 2009 this policy is under review as in other European countries like Italy.

Lord Falconer of Thoroton, former Secretary of State for Constitutional Affairs, stated that the ruling may result in some, but not all, prisoners being able to vote. The consultation is to be the subject of Judicial Review proceedings in the High Court. Separate challenges by the General Secretary of the Association of Prisoners, Ben Gunn, by way of petition to the European Union Parliament, and John Hirst to the Committee of Ministers are underway.

In the United Kingdom, prohibitions from voting are codified in section 3 and 3A of the Representation of the People Act 1983. Excluded are incarcerated criminals (including those sentenced by courts-martial, those unlawfully at large from such sentences, and those committed to psychiatric institutions as a result of a criminal court sentencing process). Civil prisoners sentenced (for non-payment of fines, or contempt of court, for example), and those on remand unsentenced retain the right to vote.

The UK was previously subject to Europe-wide rules due to various treaties and agreements associated with its membership of the European Union. The Act does not apply to elections to the European Parliament. Following Hirst v United Kingdom (No 2) (2005), in which the European Court of Human Rights (ECHR) ruled such a ban to be disproportionate, the policy was reviewed by the UK government. In 2005 the Secretary of State for Constitutional Affairs, Lord Falconer of Thoroton, stated that the review may result in the UK allowing some prisoners to vote. In 2010 the UK was still reviewing the policy, following an "unprecedented warning" from the Council of Europe. The UK government position was then that:

It remains the government's view that the right to vote goes to the essence of the offender's relationship with democratic society, and the removal of the right to vote in the case of some convicted prisoners can be a proportionate and proper response following conviction and imprisonment. The issue of voting rights for prisoners is one that the government takes very seriously and that remains under careful consideration.

Parliament voted in favor of maintaining disenfranchisement of prisoners in 2011 in response to Government plans to introduce legislation. Since then the Government has repeatedly stated that prisoners will not be given the right to vote in spite of the ECHR ruling.

In response to the ECHR ruling, Lord Chancellor and Secretary of State for Justice Chris Grayling produced a draft Voting Eligibility (Prisoners) Bill for discussion by a Joint Committee, incorporating two clear options for reform and one which would retain the blanket ban.

In an attempt to put an end to the embittered standoff between the Human Rights Court and national courts, in 2017 the Government promised to marginally extend the franchise.

==== Other European countries ====
Several other European countries permit disenfranchisement by special court order, including France and the Netherlands.

In several other European countries, no disenfranchisements due to criminal convictions exist. European countries that allow inmates to vote (as of 2012) include Albania, Croatia, the Czech Republic, Denmark, Finland, Ireland, Latvia, Lithuania, Montenegro, North Macedonia, Norway, Serbia, Spain, Sweden, Switzerland, and Ukraine. In Poland prisoners can vote, unless the court sentenced them to deprivement of their public rights, which is possible only for some crimes (some types of corruption, unlawful interference with the freedom to vote, intellectual forgery, interference with the public ITT, etc., as well as any crime with a motive deserving of particular condemnation, provided that the offender has been sentenced to at least 3 years of prison for that).

Moreover, many European countries encourage people to vote, such as by making pre-voting in other places than the respective election locales easily accessible. This often includes possibilities for prisoners to pre-vote from the prison itself. This is the case for example in Finland.

=== Middle East ===
==== Israel ====
Inmates are allowed to vote in Israel and ballot boxes are present in prisons on election day. They do not suffer disfranchisement following release from prison after serving their sentence, parole, or probation. Neither courts nor prison authorities have the power to disqualify any person from exercising the right to vote in national elections, whatever the cause of imprisonment.

=== North America ===
==== Canada ====
Canada allows inmates to vote. Section 3 of the Canadian Charter of Rights and Freedoms grants "every citizen of Canada" the right to vote, without further qualification, a constitutional right upheld as to inmates in Sauvé v Canada (Chief Electoral Officer) [2002].

==== United States ====
Many states intentionally retract the franchise from convicted felons, but differ as to when or if the franchise can be restored. In those states, felons are also prohibited from voting in federal elections, even if their convictions were for state crimes.

Maine and Vermont allow prison inmates as well as probationers and parolees to vote.

Twenty states (Alaska, Arkansas, Georgia, Idaho, Iowa, Kansas, Louisiana, Maryland, Minnesota, Missouri, Nebraska, Nevada, New Mexico, North Carolina, Oklahoma, South Carolina, Texas, Washington, West Virginia, and Wisconsin) do not allow persons convicted of a felony to vote while serving a sentence, but automatically restore the franchise to the person upon completion of a sentence. In Iowa, in July 2005, Governor Tom Vilsack issued an executive order restoring the right to vote for all persons who have completed supervision, which the Iowa Supreme Court upheld on October 31, 2005.

Fifteen states (Hawaii, Illinois, Indiana, Massachusetts, Michigan, Montana, New Hampshire, New Jersey, New York, North Dakota, Ohio, Oregon, Pennsylvania, Rhode Island, and Utah) plus the District of Columbia allow probationers and parolees to vote, but not inmates.

Four states (California, Colorado, Connecticut, and South Dakota) allow probationers to vote, but not inmates or parolees.

Eight states (Alabama, Arizona, Delaware, Florida, Kentucky, Mississippi, Tennessee, and Wyoming) allow some, but not all, persons with felony convictions to vote after having completed their sentences. Some have qualifications of this: for example, Delaware does not restore the franchise until five years after release of a person. Similarly, Kentucky requires that the person take action to gain restoration of the franchise.

One state (Virginia) permanently disfranchises persons with felony convictions. In Virginia, former Governor Terry McAuliffe used his executive power in 2017 to restore voting rights to about 140,000 people with criminal backgrounds in the state.

Disfranchisement due to criminal conviction, particularly after a sentence is served, has been opposed by the Sentencing Project, an organization in the United States working to reduce arbitrary prison sentences for minor crimes and to ameliorate the negative effects of incarceration to enable persons to rejoin society after completing sentences. Its website provides a wealth of statistical data that reflects opposing views on the issue, and data from the United States government and various state governments about the practice of felony disfranchisement.

=== Other countries ===
In some countries, such as China and Portugal, disfranchisement due to criminal conviction is an exception, meted out separately in a particular sentence. Losing voting rights is usually imposed on a person convicted of a crime against the state (see civil death) or one related to election or public office.

Peru allows inmates to vote.

In South Africa the constitution protects the right of prisoners to vote. The Constitutional Court has struck down two attempts by the government to deny the vote to convicted criminals in prison.

== In representative bodies ==
A different form of disfranchisement occurs when directly elected representatives are disqualified from participating in some (or all) votes of the representative body. One such example would be Article 7.3 of the Treaty on European Union, which as of 2025 has never been applied. Other examples are non-voting members of certain parliaments, e.g. non-voting members of the United States House of Representatives. A distinguished form of disfranchisement arises when some members of an electoral body are disqualified from participating in indirect elections.

== By electoral thresholds ==
Unmitigated electoral thresholds effectively disenfranchise voters which voted for options which later turned out to be below the threshold.

== See also ==
- Ableism
- Disfranchisement after the Reconstruction Era (United States)
- Deprivation of Political Rights (China)
- Felony disenfranchisement in the United States
- Lishenets (disfranchised in the Soviet Union)
- Multiple citizenship
- Non-citizens (Latvia)
- Non-resident citizen voting
- Non-citizen suffrage
- Nuremberg Laws
- Political apathy
- Voter caging
- Wasted vote
