= Paper Reclaim Ltd v Aotearoa International Ltd =

- Court: Court of Appeal of New Zealand
- Full case name: Paper Reclaim Ltd v Aotearoa International Ltd
- Decided: 14 March 2006
- Citations: [2006] NZCA 27 (14 March 2006); [2006] 3 NZLR 188; (2006) 8 NZBLC 101,685; (2006) 11 TCLR 544
- Transcript: judgment

Court membership
- Judges sitting: Anderson P, Chambers and O'Regan JJ

Paper Reclaim Ltd v Aotearoa International Ltd [2006] NZCA 27 (14 March 2006); [2006] 3 NZLR 188; (2006) 8 NZBLC 101,685; (2006) 11 TCLR 544 is a cited case in New Zealand holding that exemplary damages are not available for breaches of contract.
