= Loss of rights due to criminal conviction =

Rights restrictions for criminals, such as voting or gun ownership rights

Loss of rights due to criminal conviction refers to the practice in some countries of reducing the rights of individuals who have been convicted of a criminal offence. The restrictions are in addition to other penalties such as incarceration or fines. In addition to restrictions imposed directly upon conviction, there can also be collateral civil consequences resulting from a criminal conviction, but which are not imposed directly by the courts as a result of the conviction.

== Canada ==
In Canada, criminal law is a federal matter, set out in the Criminal Code. Restrictions can be placed on certain activities following a conviction involving: (1) the use of weapons in the commission of a criminal offence; (2) driving a vehicle while impaired by alcohol or drugs; (3) electoral corruption.

=== Weapon prohibitions ===
When a person is convicted of an offence in which the person used a weapon, or threatened to use a weapon, the sentencing court has the power to prohibit the person from possessing a weapon for a certain period of time. In the case of certain offences, the prohibition on possession is mandatory. In other cases, the court has discretion whether to impose a prohibition on possession.

For first offences, the court can set the prohibition period as any time up to ten years. For subsequent offences, the convicted person is prohibited from possessing a weapon for life. However, even for first offences, the court can impose a lifetime prohibition if the convicted person used a weapon against the convicted person's intimate partner, the convicted person's children, or any person living with the convicted person. As well, there is a lifetime prohibition on possessing prohibited firearms or weapons (such as fully automatic firearms), and restricted firearms (such as handguns).

=== Driving prohibitions ===
The Criminal Code contains several offences related to driving a motor vehicle, including driving while impaired or with a blood alcohol count greater than eighty milligrams of alcohol in one hundred millilitres of blood (".08"), impaired or .08 driving causing bodily harm or death, dangerous driving (including dangerous driving causing bodily harm or death), and street racing. A person convicted of one of these offences can be subject to a prohibition on driving a motor vehicle for a certain period of time.

For convictions for impaired driving or driving over .08, the court must impose a mandatory driving prohibition of at least one year and not more than three years for a first offence. The length of the mandatory driving prohibitions increase with second and subsequent offences. If the convicted person participates in an interlock program, the length of the prohibition may be reduced, but must be at least three months. Similar mandatory prohibition orders are imposed for offences involving a motor vehicle which cause bodily harm or death and for street racing.

For offences other than impaired driving/.08 or street racing, or not involving bodily harm or death, the sentencing court has discretion to impose driving prohibitions.

In addition to the driving prohibitions under the Criminal Code, there may be collateral civil consequences. For example, driver licences are issued under provincial law. All provinces will cancel the driver licence of a person convicted of certain driving offences under the Criminal Code.

=== Electoral corruption ===
The Canadian Charter of Rights and Freedoms guarantees that all Canadian citizens have the right to vote in federal and provincial elections. The Supreme Court of Canada has held that even if a Canadian citizen has committed a criminal offence and is incarcerated, they retain the constitutional right to vote. In the 2015 federal election, more than 22,000 inmates in federal correctional institutes were eligible to vote.

There is one exception to this general principle. The Supreme Court has held that if a person is convicted of corrupt electoral practices, they can be evicted from the legislature, barred from being nominated for election for a set period, and denied the right to vote for a set period. These restrictions are acceptable because they are a sanction aimed at the very offence committed by the individual, rather than being a general disenfranchisement. The restrictions are aimed at healing the corrupted electoral process, which itself is a constitutional value, and therefore can be justified for limited periods.

== United Kingdom ==
Within the United Kingdom, criminal law is primarily a matter of the four constituent countries. After a conviction, an offender can, in some cases, lose:

- the ability to keep or obtain a licence to drive a motor vehicle (particularly after a conviction for causing death by dangerous or impaired driving)
- the ability to work with children (particularly after a conviction that requires the offender to register as a sex offender)
- the ability (if a non-citizen) to live in the United Kingdom (even if, before being convicted, he or she had the ability to vote in general elections under indefinite leave to remain).
- while imprisoned, the right to vote – see Disenfranchisement § United Kingdom.

== United States ==
In the United States, loss of rights due to criminal conviction can take several forms, including voting disenfranchisement, exclusion from jury duty, and loss of the right to possess firearms.

=== Disenfranchisement ===
Every state with the exception of Maine and Vermont prohibits felons from voting while in prison. Nine other states disenfranchise felons for various lengths of time following the completion of their probation or parole. However, the severity of each state's disenfranchisement varies. 1 in 43 adults were disenfranchised as of 2006. The issue of disenfranchisement gained awareness in 2000 after the "excruciatingly close" presidential election, wherein 2% of the voting-age population was prohibited from participating. In that election, George W. Bush won Florida by 537 votes, however 31% of Black Floridians were denied the vote due to disenfranchisement. It is possible that disenfranchisement of convicted felons changed the outcome of the election. An offense punishable by up to 30 years imprisonment may result in a disenfranchisement of the right to vote for a span of 30 years, but this also varies widely by state. The federal government also has different laws regarding the loss of rights due to criminal conviction.

In Reynolds v. Sims, the Court ruled that the right to vote is a "fundamental right," establishing a strict scrutiny test. Further, the Fourteenth Amendment guarantees "equal protection of the laws" to all persons. However, Section 2 of this Amendment allows states to remove voting privileges from anyone who has participated in "rebellion or other crime." A 1972 Supreme Court ruling found that this article applied to disenfranchisement of ex-felons. The Civic Participation and Rehabilitation Act, allowing for ex-felons to vote, has been introduced at the beginning of every legislative session since 1994, but has never made it to the floor of Congress.

Only one state, Kentucky continues to impose a lifelong denial of the right to vote to all citizens with a felony record, in the absence of a restoration of civil rights by the Governor or, where allowed, state legislature. Until 2018, Florida also denied the right to vote to all felons; this changed upon the passing of the Voting Rights Restoration for Felons Initiative.

=== Felon jury exclusion ===
The lifetime exclusion of felons from jury service is the majority rule in the United States, used in 31 states and in federal courts. The result is that over 6% of the adult population is excluded, including about 30% of black men. Felon jury exclusion is less visible than felony disenfranchisement, and few socio-legal scholars have challenged the statutes that withhold a convicted felon's opportunity to sit on a jury. While constitutional challenges to felon jury exclusion almost always originate from interested litigants, some scholars contend that "it is the interests of the excluded felons that are most directly implicated."

Yet attacks on these blanket prohibitions levied by excluded felon jurors have failed consistently. The United States Supreme Court does not recognize the right to sit on a jury as fundamental. It has been pointed out that, although lawmakers assert that felon jury exclusion measures protect the integrity of the adjudicative process, as felons "lack the requisite probity" to serve on a jury and are "inherently biased," many of the states subscribing to this practice allow felons to practice law. But that is a double standard only if it is presumed that those who judge the arguments of both sides in a case are allowed to be as biased as those arguing for each side.

=== Loss of right to possess firearms ===
Since 1968, felons are regarded by the federal government, and most US states, as being "prohibited persons" under US law (18 U.S. Code § 922(g)). It is a class C felony punishable by up to 10 years in prison under this subsection "to ship or transport in interstate or foreign commerce, or possess in or affecting commerce, any firearm or ammunition; or to receive any firearm or ammunition which has been shipped or transported in interstate or foreign commerce."

Critics state that the overly broad prohibition of all felons from owning guns serves no "public safety" benefit since, "Many felonies are not violent in the least, raising no particular suspicion that the convict is a threat to public safety" according to UCLA law professor and firearms expert Adam Winkler, "Perjury, securities law violations, embezzlement, obstruction of justice, and a host of other felonies do not indicate a propensity for dangerousness. It is hard to imagine how banning Martha Stewart or Enron's Andrew Fastow from possessing a gun furthers public safety."

== See also ==
- Civil death, a medieval practice that includes the loss of many rights
- Disfranchisement § Based on criminal conviction
- Collateral consequences of criminal conviction
- Voter suppression in the United States § Felon disenfranchisement
