= Hirst v United Kingdom (No 2) =

UK legal case

Hirst v the United Kingdom (No 2)
- Court: European Court of Human Rights
- Citations: [2005] ECHR 681, (2006) 42 EHRR 41

Keywords
- Prisoner, right to vote

Hirst v United Kingdom (No 2) (2005) ECHR 681 is a European Court of Human Rights ruled that a blanket ban on British prisoners exercising the right to vote is contrary to the European Convention on Human Rights. The court did not state that all prisoners should be given voting rights. Rather, it held that if the franchise was to be removed, then the measure needed to be compatible with Article 3 of the First Protocol, thus putting the onus upon the UK to justify its departure from the principle of universal suffrage.

== Facts ==
John Hirst, a post-tariff prisoner then serving a sentence for manslaughter, was prevented from voting by section 3 of the Representation of the People Act 1983, which prohibits convicted prisoners from voting during their incarceration in a penal institution. In 2001, Hirst brought a case to the High Court, but the case was dismissed.

== Judgment ==
In 2004, the Chamber of the European Court of Human Rights, recorded in Hirst v UK (No 2) (2006) 42 EHRR 41, ruled unanimously that there had been a violation of Hirst's human right under Article 3 of the First Protocol. The UK lodged an appeal to the Grand Chamber, and on 6 October 2005, it found in favour of Hirst by a majority of twelve to five. The Court found that the restriction of prisoners' voting rights violated Protocol 1, Article 3 of the European Convention on Human Rights;

Once a case has been decided by the ECtHR, it falls to the Committee of Ministers to supervise execution of the Court's judgment. The British Government initially attempted to introduce legislation to give prisoners the right to vote. This was rejected by the British Parliament and the Government has repeatedly stated since then that prisoners will not be given the right to vote in spite of the ruling.

In the UK, the court was criticized for allegedly being over-intrusive in areas considered to be the domain of domestic courts and parliament; Kenneth Clarke and Dominic Grieve claimed that the court does not give sufficient margin of appreciation to states, a controversy being the court's requirement that the UK liberalize voting rights for prisoners, a decision called "completely unacceptable" by David Cameron. Cameron also claimed that the concept of human rights was being "distorted" and "discredited" by the ECHR, because reasonable decisions made at a national level were not respected by the court.

== See also ==
- Disfranchisement
- Felony disenfranchisement
