= 2017 term opinions of the Supreme Court of the United States =

October 2017 to October 2018 opinions

The 2017 term of the Supreme Court of the United States began October 2, 2017, and concluded September 30, 2018. The table below illustrates which opinion was filed by each justice in each case and which justices joined each opinion.

== Table key ==
Delivered the court's opinion

Joined the court's opinion

Filed a concurrence

Joined a concurrence

Filed a dissent

Joined a dissent

Filed a concurrence/dissent

Joined a concurrence/dissent

Did not participate in the decision
- Decisions that do not note an argument date were decided without oral argument. Decisions that do not note a justice delivering the court's opinion are per curiam.
- Multiple concurrences and dissents within a case are numbered, with joining votes numbered accordingly. Justices frequently join multiple opinions in a single case; each vote is subdivided accordingly.
- An asterisk ( * ) in the court's opinion denotes that it was only a majority in part or a plurality. An asterisk in a joining vote denotes that the justice joined it only in part.
- A dash ( - ) denotes that the justice voted without filing or joining an opinion.

== 2017 term opinions ==
#	Case name and citation	Argued	Decided	Roberts	Kennedy	Thomas	Ginsburg	Breyer	Alito	Sotomayor	Kagan	Gorsuch
1	Kernan v. Cuero, 583 U.S. ___		November 6, 2017									
2	Dunn v. Madison, 583 U.S. ___		November 6, 2017				1	1 / 2		1		
3	Hamer v. Neighborhood Housing Servs. of Chicago, 583 U.S. ___	October 10, 2017	November 8, 2017									
4	In re United States, 583 U.S. ___		December 20, 2017									
5	Tharpe v. Sellers, 583 U.S. ___		January 8, 2018									
6	District of Columbia v. Wesby, 583 U.S. ___	October 4, 2017	January 22, 2018				1			2		
7	Artis v. District of Columbia, 583 U.S. ___	November 1, 2017	January 22, 2018									
8	National Assn. of Mfrs. v. Department of Defense, 583 U.S. ___	October 11, 2017	January 22, 2018									
9	CNH Industrial N. V. v. Reese, 583 U.S. ___		February 20, 2018									
10	Digital Realty Trust, Inc. v. Somers, 583 U.S. ___	November 28, 2017	February 21, 2018			1		2	1	2		1
11	Class v. United States, 583 U.S. ___	October 4, 2017	February 21, 2018									
12	Rubin v. Islamic Republic of Iran, 583 U.S. ___	December 4, 2017	February 21, 2018									
13	Murphy v. Smith, 583 U.S. ___	December 6, 2017	February 21, 2018									
14	Patchak v. Zinke, 583 U.S. ___	November 7, 2017	February 27, 2018			*	1	2		1 / 3		
15	Jennings v. Rodriguez, 583 U.S. ___	October 3, 2017	February 27, 2018			*			*	*		* / *
16	Merit Management Group, LP v. FTI Consulting, Inc., 583 U.S. ___	November 6, 2017	February 27, 2018									
17	U.S. Bank N.A. v. Village at Lakeridge, LLC, 583 U.S. ___	October 31, 2017	March 5, 2018		1 / 2	2				2		2
18	Texas v. New Mexico and Colorado, 583 U.S. ___	January 8, 2018	March 5, 2018									
19	Cyan, Inc. v. Beaver County Employees Retirement Fund, 583 U.S. ___	November 28, 2017	March 20, 2018									
20	Marinello v. United States, 584 U.S. ___	December 6, 2017	March 21, 2018									
21	Ayestas v. Davis, 584 U.S. ___	October 30, 2017	March 21, 2018									
22	Hall v. Hall, 584 U.S. ___	January 16, 2018	March 27, 2018									
23	Encino Motorcars v. Navarro, 584 U.S. ___	January 17, 2018	April 2, 2018									
24	Kisela v. Hughes, 584 U.S. ___		April 2, 2018									
25	Wilson v. Sellers, 584 U.S. ___	October 30, 2017	April 17, 2018									
26	Sessions v. Dimaya, 584 U.S. ___	October 2, 2017	April 17, 2018	1	1 / 2*	1 / 2			1 / 2*		*	*
27	United States v. Microsoft Corp., 584 U.S. ___	February 27, 2018	April 17, 2018									
28	Jesner v. Arab Bank, PLC, 584 U.S. ___	October 11, 2017	April 24, 2018		*	1			* / 2			* / 3
29	Oil States Energy Services, LLC v. Greene's Energy Group, LLC, 584 U.S. ___	November 27, 2017	April 24, 2018									
30	SAS Institute Inc. v. Iancu, 584 U.S. ___	November 27, 2017	April 24, 2018				1 / 2	1 / 2		1 / 2	1 / 2*	
31	United States v. Sanchez-Gomez, 584 U.S. ___	March 26, 2018	May 14, 2018									
32	Byrd v. United States, 584 U.S. ___	January 9, 2018	May 14, 2018			1			2			1
33	McCoy v. Louisiana, 584 U.S. ___	January 17, 2018	May 14, 2018									
34	Dahda v. United States, 584 U.S. ___	February 21, 2018	May 14, 2018									
35	Murphy v. National Collegiate Athletic Association, 584 U.S. ___	December 4, 2017	May 14, 2018					* / *				
36	Epic Systems Corp. v. Lewis, 584 U.S. ___	October 2, 2017	May 21, 2018									
37	Upper Skagit Tribe v. Lundgren, 584 U.S. ___	March 21, 2018	May 21, 2018									
38	Lagos v. United States, 584 U.S. ___	April 18, 2018	May 29, 2018									
39	Collins v. Virginia, 584 U.S. ___	January 9, 2018	May 29, 2018									
40	City of Hays v. Vogt, 584 U.S. ___	February 20, 2018	May 29, 2018									
41	Masterpiece Cakeshop, Ltd. v. Colorado Civil Rights Comm'n, 584 U.S. ___	December 5, 2017	June 4, 2018			1		2	3		2	1 / 3
42	Hughes v. United States, 584 U.S. ___	March 27, 2018	June 4, 2018									
43	Koons v. United States, 584 U.S. ___	March 27, 2018	June 4, 2018									
44	Lamar, Archer & Cofrin, LLP v. Appling, 584 U.S. ___	April 17, 2018	June 4, 2018			*			*			*
45	Azar v. Garza, 584 U.S. ___		June 4, 2018									
46	China Agritech, Inc. v. Resh, 584 U.S. ___	March 26, 2018	June 11, 2018									
47	Husted v. A. Philip Randolph Institute, 584 U.S. ___	January 10, 2018	June 11, 2018				1	1		1 / 2	1	
48	Sveen v. Melin, 584 U.S. ___	March 19, 2018	June 11, 2018									
49	Washington v. United States, 584 U.S. ___	April 18, 2018	June 11, 2018									
50	Minnesota Voters Alliance v. Mansky, 585 U.S. ___	February 28, 2018	June 14, 2018									
51	Animal Science Products, Inc. v. Hebei Welcome Pharmaceutical Co., 585 U.S. ___	April 24, 2018	June 14, 2018									
52	Gill v. Whitford, 585 U.S. ___	October 3, 2017	June 18, 2018			* / 1	2	2		2	2	* / 1
53	Lozman v. City of Riviera Beach, 585 U.S. ___	February 27, 2018	June 18, 2018									
54	Chavez-Meza v. United States, 585 U.S. ___	April 23, 2018	June 18, 2018									
55	Rosales-Mireles v. United States, 585 U.S. ___	February 21, 2018	June 18, 2018									
56	Benisek v. Lamone, 585 U.S. ___		June 18, 2018									
57	South Dakota v. Wayfair, Inc., 585 U.S. ___	April 17, 2018	June 21, 2018			1						2
58	Pereira v. Sessions, 585 U.S. ___	April 23, 2018	June 21, 2018									
59	Lucia v. SEC, 585 U.S. ___	April 23, 2018	June 21, 2018				*			*		
60	Wisconsin Central Ltd. v. United States, 585 U.S. ___	April 16, 2018	June 21, 2018									
61	Carpenter v. United States, 585 U.S. ___	November 29, 2017	June 22, 2018		1	1 / 2 / 3			1 / 3			4
62	WesternGeco LLC v. ION Geophysical Corp., 585 U.S. ___	April 16, 2018	June 22, 2018									
63	Ortiz v. United States, 585 U.S. ___	January 16, 2018	June 22, 2018									
64	Currier v. Virginia, 585 U.S. ___	February 20, 2018	June 22, 2018		*							*
65	Dalmazzi v. United States, 585 U.S. ___	January 16, 2018	June 22, 2018									
66	Cox v. United States, 585 U.S. ___	January 16, 2018	June 22, 2018									
67	Ohio v. American Express Co., 585 U.S. ___	February 26, 2018	June 25, 2018									
68	Abbott v. Perez, 585 U.S. ___	April 24, 2018	June 25, 2018									
69	Trump v. Hawaii, 585 U.S. ___	April 25, 2018	June 26, 2018		1	2	2	1		2	1	
70	National Institute of Family and Life Advocates v. Becerra, 585 U.S. ___	March 20, 2018	June 26, 2018									
71	Florida v. Georgia, 585 U.S. ___	January 8, 2018	June 27, 2018									
72	Janus v. State, County, and Municipal Employees, 585 U.S. ___	February 26, 2018	June 27, 2018				2	2		1 / 2	2	
73	Sause v. Bauer, 585 U.S. ___		June 28, 2018									
74	Sexton v. Beaudreaux, 585 U.S. ___		June 28, 2018					-				
75	North Carolina v. Covington, 585 U.S. ___		June 28, 2018									
#	Case name and citation	Argued	Decided	Roberts	Kennedy	Thomas	Ginsburg	Breyer	Alito	Sotomayor	Kagan	Gorsuch

== 2017 term membership and statistics ==
This was the thirteenth term of Chief Justice Roberts's tenure. Justice Kennedy retired on July 31, 2018, making it the second and final (and also the only full) term with the same membership.

Justice		Appointment history		Agreement with judgment		Opinions filed				
Seniority	Name	President	Date confirmed	%	#					Total
Chief Justice	John Roberts	George W. Bush	September 29, 2005	93.3%	70/75	6	1	0	4	11
Associate Justice	Anthony Kennedy	Ronald Reagan	February 18, 1988	91.9%	68/74	6	5	0	2	13
Associate Justice	Clarence Thomas	George H. W. Bush	October 23, 1991	81.3%	61/75	7	15	0	9	31
Associate Justice	Ruth Bader Ginsburg	Bill Clinton	August 10, 1993	76%	57/75	6	3	0	6	15
Associate Justice	Stephen Breyer	Bill Clinton	August 3, 1994	73.3%	55/75	7	3	2	7	19
Associate Justice	Samuel Alito	George W. Bush	January 31, 2006	80%	60/75	7	2	0	6	15
Associate Justice	Sonia Sotomayor	Barack Obama	August 6, 2009	72%	54/75	7	7	0	9	23
Associate Justice	Elena Kagan	Barack Obama	August 7, 2010	78.1%	57/73	6	2	0	1	9
Associate Justice	Neil Gorsuch	Donald Trump	April 7, 2017	84.7%	61/72	7	4	0	6	17
Notes on statistics: Opinion counts only include the bench opinions listed above; opinions relating to orders or in-chambers opinions are not included.; Agreement with the Court's judgment does not guarantee agreement with the reasoning expressed in its opinion. A justice is not considered in agreement if they dissented even in part. Agreement percentages are based only on the listed cases in which a justice participated and are rounded to the nearest one-tenth of one percentage point.						Totals				
Notes on statistics: Opinion counts only include the bench opinions listed above; opinions relating to orders or in-chambers opinions are not included.; Agreement with the Court's judgment does not guarantee agreement with the reasoning expressed in its opinion. A justice is not considered in agreement if they dissented even in part. Agreement percentages are based only on the listed cases in which a justice participated and are rounded to the nearest one-tenth of one percentage point.						59	42	2	50	153
