= 2017 term United States Supreme Court opinions of Clarence Thomas =

The 2017 term of the Supreme Court of the United States began October 2, 2017, and concluded September 30, 2018. This was the twenty-seventh term of Associate Justice Clarence Thomas's tenure on the Court.
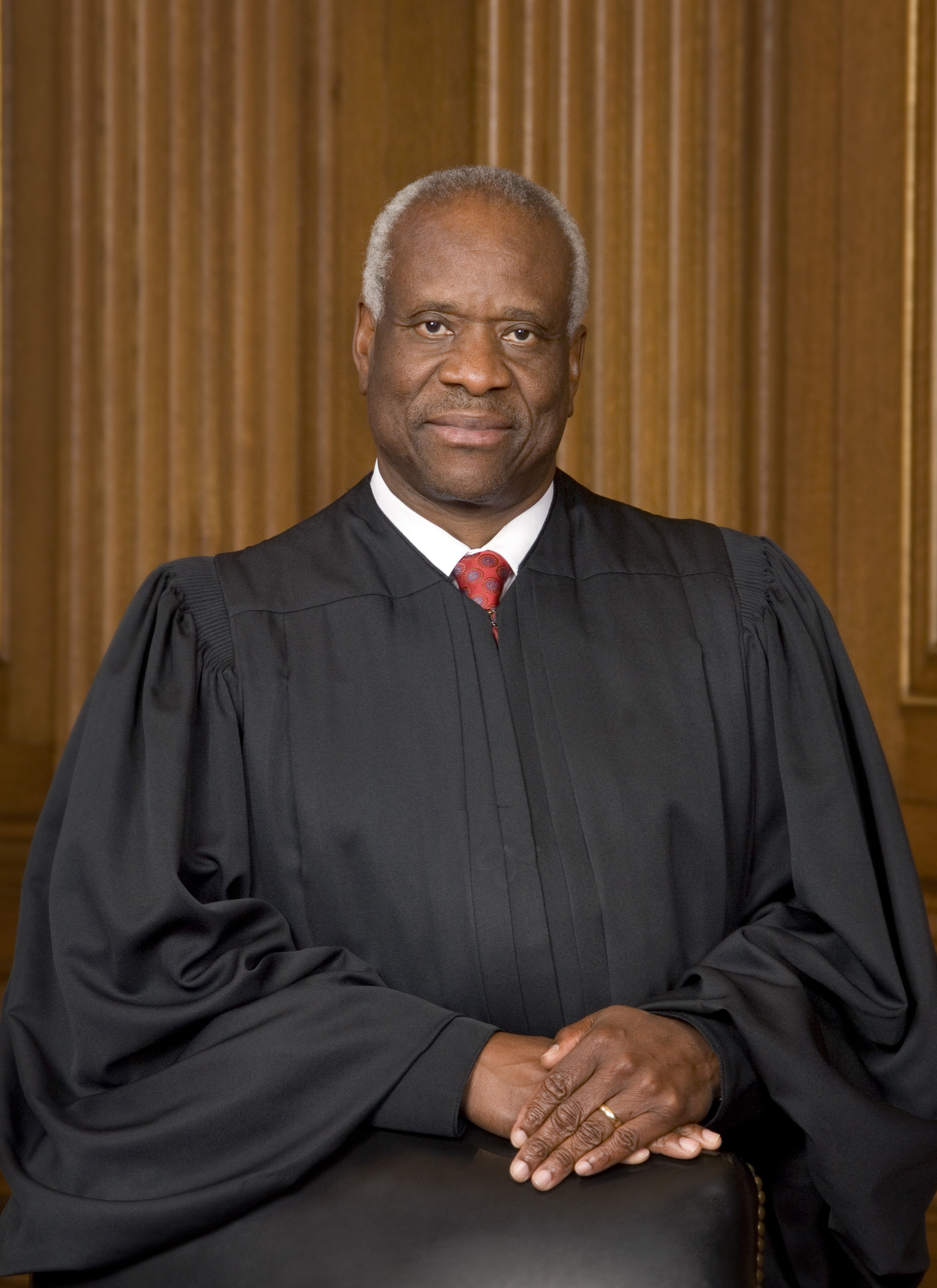

Clarence Thomas 2017 term statistics

| 7 | Majority or plurality | 15 | Concurrence | 0 | Other |
| 13 | Dissent | 0 | Concurrence/dissent | Total = | 35 |
| Bench opinions = 31 | | Opinions relating to orders = 4 | | In-chambers opinions = 0 |
| Unanimous opinions: 0 | | Most joined by: Gorsuch (14 in full, 1 in part) | | Least joined by: Ginsburg, Sotomayor (2) |

| Type | Case | Citation | Issues | Joined by | Other opinions |
|---|---|---|---|---|---|
| | Upstate Citizens for Equality, Inc. v. United States | 583 U.S. ___ (2017) | Indian Commerce Clause • Indian Reorganization Act • taking of state land into trust | | |
Thomas dissented from the Court's denial of certiorari.
| | Tharpe v. Sellers | 583 U.S. ___ (2018) | | Alito, Gorsuch | per curiam |
| | District of Columbia v. Wesby | 583 U.S. ___ (2018) | Fourth Amendment • probable cause • totality of the circumstances • qualified immunity | Roberts, Kennedy, Breyer, Alito, Kagan, Gorsuch | Ginsburg; Sotomayor |
| | Silvester v. Becerra | 583 U.S. ___ (2018) | Second Amendment • right to bear arms • state law firearm purchase waiting period | | |
Thomas dissented from the Court's denial of certiorari.
| | Digital Realty Trust, Inc. v. Somers | 583 U.S. ___ (2018) | Dodd–Frank Wall Street Reform and Consumer Protection Act • whistleblower protection | Alito, Gorsuch | Ginsburg; Sotomayor |
| | Patchak v. Zinke | 583 U.S. ___ (2018) | Indian Reorganization Act • Gun Lake Act • Article III | Breyer, Alito, Kagan | Ginsburg; Breyer; Sotomayor; Roberts |
| | Jennings v. Rodriguez | 583 U.S. ___ (2018) | | Gorsuch (in part) | Alito; Breyer |
| | Garco Construction, Inc. v. Speer | 583 U.S. ___ (2018) | | Gorsuch | |
Thomas dissented from the Court's denial of certiorari.
| | Marinello v. United States | 584 U.S. ___ (2018) | interference with IRS proceeding | Alito | Breyer |
| | Encino Motorcars, LLC v. Navarro | 584 U.S. ___ (2018) | Fair Labor Standards Act • exemption from overtime pay for salesmen | Roberts, Kennedy, Alito, Gorsuch | Ginsburg |
| | Sessions v. Dimaya | 584 U.S. ___ (2018) | Immigration and Nationality Act • deportation for crime of violence • Due Process Clause • void for vagueness doctrine | Kennedy, Alito (in part) | Kagan; Gorsuch; Roberts |
| | Jesner v. Arab Bank, PLC | 584 U.S. ___ (2018) | Alien Tort Statute • suits against foreign corporations | | Kennedy; Alito; Gorsuch; Sotomayor |
| | Oil States Energy Services, LLC v. Greene's Energy Group, LLC | 584 U.S. ___ (2018) | patent law • inter partes review • cancellation of patent by United States Patent and Trademark Office • Article III | Kennedy, Ginsburg, Breyer, Alito, Sotomayor, Kagan | Breyer; Gorsuch |
| | Byrd v. United States | 584 U.S. ___ (2018) | Fourth Amendment • search of rental vehicle • expectation of privacy of driver not listed on rental agreement | Gorsuch | Kennedy; Alito |
| | Murphy v. National Collegiate Athletic Assn. | 584 U.S. ___ (2018) | Professional and Amateur Sports Protection Act • state authorization of sports gambling • Tenth Amendment • anticommandeering doctrine | | Alito; Breyer; Ginsburg |
| | Epic Systems Corp. v. Lewis | 584 U.S. ___ (2018) | Federal Arbitration Act • Fair Labor Standards Act • concerted action in employment disputes | | Gorsuch; Ginsburg |
| | Upper Skagit Tribe v. Lundgren | 584 U.S. ___ (2018) | tribal sovereign immunity • immovable property exception | Alito | Gorsuch; Roberts |
| | Collins v. Virginia | 584 U.S. ___ (2018) | Fourth Amendment • motor vehicle exception to warrant requirement • search of curtilage • exclusionary rule • Supremacy Clause | | Sotomayor; Alito |
| | Masterpiece Cakeshop, Ltd. v. Colorado Civil Rights Comm'n | 584 U.S. ___ (2018) | First Amendment • Free Exercise Clause • LGBT anti-discrimination law in public accommodations | Gorsuch | Kennedy; Kagan; Gorsuch; Ginsburg |
| | Husted v. A. Philip Randolph Institute | 584 U.S. ___ (2018) | National Voter Registration Act • Help America Vote Act of 2002 • deregistration for failure to vote | | Alito; Breyer; Sotomayor |
| | Gill v. Whitford | 585 U.S. ___ (2018) | partisan gerrymandering • Article III • standing • Equal Protection | Gorsuch | Roberts; Kagan |
| | Lozman v. City of Riviera Beach | 585 U.S. ___ (2018) | First Amendment • freedom of speech • retaliatory arrest • probable cause | | Kennedy |
| | Rosales-Mireles v. United States | 585 U.S. ___ (2018) | United States Federal Sentencing Guidelines • Federal Rules of Criminal Procedure • errors in calculating sentencing range | Alito | Sotomayor |
| | South Dakota v. Wayfair, Inc. | 585 U.S. ___ (2018) | state taxation of internet commerce • Commerce Clause • physical presence of out of state seller | | Kennedy; Gorsuch; Roberts |
| | Lucia v. SEC | 585 U.S. ___ (2018) | SEC administrative law judges • Appointments Clause | Gorsuch | Kagan; Breyer; Sotomayor |
| | Carpenter v. United States | 585 U.S. ___ (2018) | Fourth Amendment • acquisition of cell site records without search warrant | | Roberts; Kennedy; Alito; Gorsuch |
| | WesternGeco LLC v. ION Geophysical Corp. | 585 U.S. ___ (2018) | patent law • recovery of foreign profits as infringement damages | Roberts, Kennedy, Ginsburg, Alito, Sotomayor, Kagan | Gorsuch |
| | Ortiz v. United States | 585 U.S. ___ (2018) | Article III • appellate jurisdiction over U.S. Court of Appeals for the Armed Forces • Article II • Appointments Clause • eligibility to serve on Air Force Court of Criminal Appeals after appointment to Court of Military Commission Review | | Kagan; Alito |
| | Ohio v. American Express Co. | 585 U.S. ___ (2018) | antitrust law • Sherman Antitrust Act • antisteering provisions in two-sided credit card markets | Roberts, Kennedy, Alito, Gorsuch | Breyer |
| | Abbott v. Perez | 585 U.S. ___ (2018) | legislative redistricting • Voting Rights Act • Fourteenth Amendment • Equal Protection Clause • racial gerrymandering | Gorsuch | Alito; Sotomayor |
| | Trump v. Hawaii | 585 U.S. ___ (2018) | Executive Order 13780 • Immigration and Nationality Act • Article III • First Amendment • Establishment Clause • authority of district court to issue universal injunction | | Roberts; Kennedy; Breyer; Sotomayor |
| | National Institute of Family and Life Advocates v. Becerra | 585 U.S. ___ (2018) | First Amendment • free speech • abortion • crisis pregnancy center notice and disclosure requirements regarding licensure and abortion service availability | Roberts, Kennedy, Alito, Gorsuch | Kennedy; Breyer |
| | Florida v. Georgia | 585 U.S. ___ (2018) | tri-state water dispute | Alito, Kagan, Gorsuch | Breyer |
| | North Carolina v. Covington | 585 U.S. ___ (2018) | legislative redistricting • racial gerrymandering | | per curiam |
| | Rowan County v. Lund | 585 U.S. ___ (2018) | First Amendment • Establishment Clause • legislative prayer | Gorsuch | |
Thomas dissented from the Court's denial of certiorari.
