= 2017 term United States Supreme Court opinions of Stephen Breyer =

The 2017 term of the Supreme Court of the United States began October 2, 2017, and concluded September 30, 2018. This was the twenty-fourth term of Associate Justice Stephen Breyer's tenure on the Court.
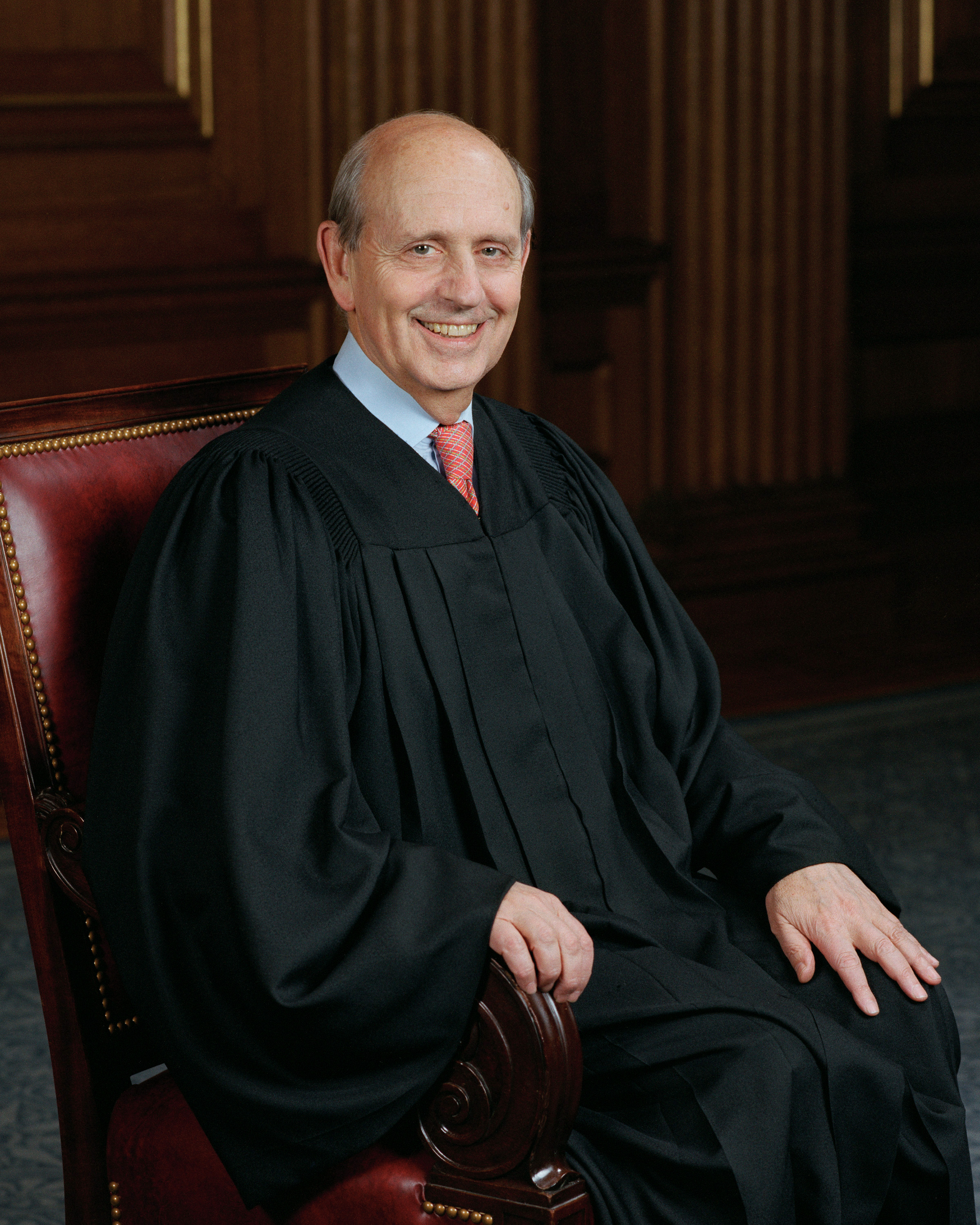

Stephen Breyer 2017 term statistics

7	Majority or plurality	3	Concurrence	2	Other
11	Dissent	2	Concurrence/dissent	Total =	25
Bench opinions = 19		Opinions relating to orders = 6		In-chambers opinions = 0
Unanimous opinions: 1		Most joined by: Ginsburg (16 in full, 1 in part)		Least joined by: Thomas, Alito, Gorsuch (3)

Type	Case	Citation	Issues	Joined by	Other opinions
	Truehill v. Florida	583 U.S. ___ (2017)	Eighth Amendment		Sotomayor
Breyer dissented from the Court's denial of certiorari.
	Dunn v. Madison	583 U.S. ___ (2017)	Eighth Amendment		per curiam; Ginsburg
	In re United States	583 U.S. ___ (2017)	Deferred Action for Childhood Arrivals • Administrative Procedure Act • writ of mandamus	Ginsburg, Sotomayor, Kagan	
Breyer dissented from the Court's grant of a stay.
	Class v. United States	583 U.S. ___ (2017)	challenge to constitutionality of statute after guilty plea • Federal Rule of Criminal Procedure 11	Roberts, Ginsburg, Sotomayor, Kagan, Gorsuch	Alito
	Hamm v. Dunn	583 U.S. ___ (2018)	Eighth Amendment • death penalty		Ginsburg
Breyer filed a statement respecting the Court's denial of a stay and of certiorari.
	Middleton v. Florida	583 U.S. ___ (2018)	Eighth Amendment • death penalty		Sotomayor
Breyer dissented from the Court's denial of certiorari.
	Patchak v. Zinke	583 U.S. ___ (2018)	Indian Reorganization Act • Gun Lake Act • Article III		Thomas; Ginsburg; Sotomayor; Roberts
	Jennings v. Rodriguez	583 U.S. ___ (2018)		Ginsburg, Sotomayor	Alito; Thomas
	Hidalgo v Arizona	583 U.S. ___ (2018)	Eighth Amendment • death penalty	Ginsburg, Sotomayor, Kagan	
Breyer filed a statement respecting the Court's denial of certiorari.
	Marinello v. United States	584 U.S. ___ (2018)	interference with IRS proceeding	Roberts, Kennedy, Ginsburg, Sotomayor, Kagan, Gorsuch	Thomas
	Wilson v. Sellers	584 U.S. ___ (2018)	habeas corpus • review of unexplained state court decisions	Roberts, Kennedy, Ginsburg, Sotomayor, Kagan	Gorsuch
	Oil States Energy Services, LLC v. Greene's Energy Group, LLC	584 U.S. ___ (2018)	patent law • inter partes review • cancellation of patent by United States Patent and Trademark Office • Article III	Ginsburg, Sotomayor	Thomas; Gorsuch
	SAS Institute Inc. v. Iancu	584 U.S. ___ (2018)	patent law • inter partes review	Ginsburg, Sotomayor; Kagan (in part)	Gorsuch; Ginsburg
	Dahda v. United States	584 U.S. ___ (2018)	Omnibus Crime Control and Safe Streets Act of 1968 • authorization of wiretapping outside court's territorial jurisdiction	Roberts, Kennedy, Thomas, Ginsburg, Alito, Sotomayor, Kagan	
	Murphy v. National Collegiate Athletic Assn.	584 U.S. ___ (2018)	Professional and Amateur Sports Protection Act • state authorization of sports gambling • Tenth Amendment • anticommandeering doctrine		Alito; Thomas; Ginsburg
	Lagos v. United States	584 U.S. ___ (2018)	Mandatory Victims Restitution Act of 1996 • restitution for costs and fees from private investigations and civil proceedings	Unanimous	
	Husted v. A. Philip Randolph Institute	584 U.S. ___ (2018)	National Voter Registration Act • Help America Vote Act of 2002 • deregistration for failure to vote	Ginsburg, Sotomayor, Kagan	Alito; Thomas; Sotomayor
	Chavez-Meza v. United States	585 U.S. ___ (2018)	United States Federal Sentencing Guidelines • judicial explanation for sentence reduction	Roberts, Thomas, Ginsburg, Alito	Kennedy
	Lucia v. SEC	585 U.S. ___ (2018)	SEC administrative law judges • Appointments Clause	Ginsburg, Sotomayor (in part)	Kagan; Thomas; Sotomayor
	Wisconsin Central Ltd. v. United States	585 U.S. ___ (2018)	Railroad Retirement Tax Act of 1937 • employee stock option plans	Ginsburg, Sotomayor, Kagan	Gorsuch
	Ohio v. American Express Co.	585 U.S. ___ (2018)	antitrust law • Sherman Antitrust Act • antisteering provisions in two-sided credit card markets	Ginsburg, Sotomayor, Kagan	Thomas
	Trump v. Hawaii	585 U.S. ___ (2018)	Executive Order 13780 • Immigration and Nationality Act • Article III • First Amendment • Establishment Clause	Kagan	Roberts; Kennedy; Thomas; Sotomayor
	National Institute of Family and Life Advocates v. Becerra	585 U.S. ___ (2018)	First Amendment • free speech • abortion • crisis pregnancy center notice and disclosure requirements regarding licensure and abortion service availability	Ginsburg, Sotomayor, Kagan	Thomas; Kennedy
	Florida v. Georgia	585 U.S. ___ (2018)	tri-state water dispute	Roberts, Kennedy, Ginsburg, Sotomayor	Thomas
	Jordan v. Mississippi	585 U.S. ___ (2018)	Eighth Amendment • death penalty • delay and uncertainty in execution		
Breyer dissented from the Court's denial of certiorari.
