= 2017 term United States Supreme Court opinions of Sonia Sotomayor =

The 2017 term of the Supreme Court of the United States began October 2, 2017, and concluded September 30, 2018. This was the ninth term of Associate Justice Sonia Sotomayor's tenure on the Court.
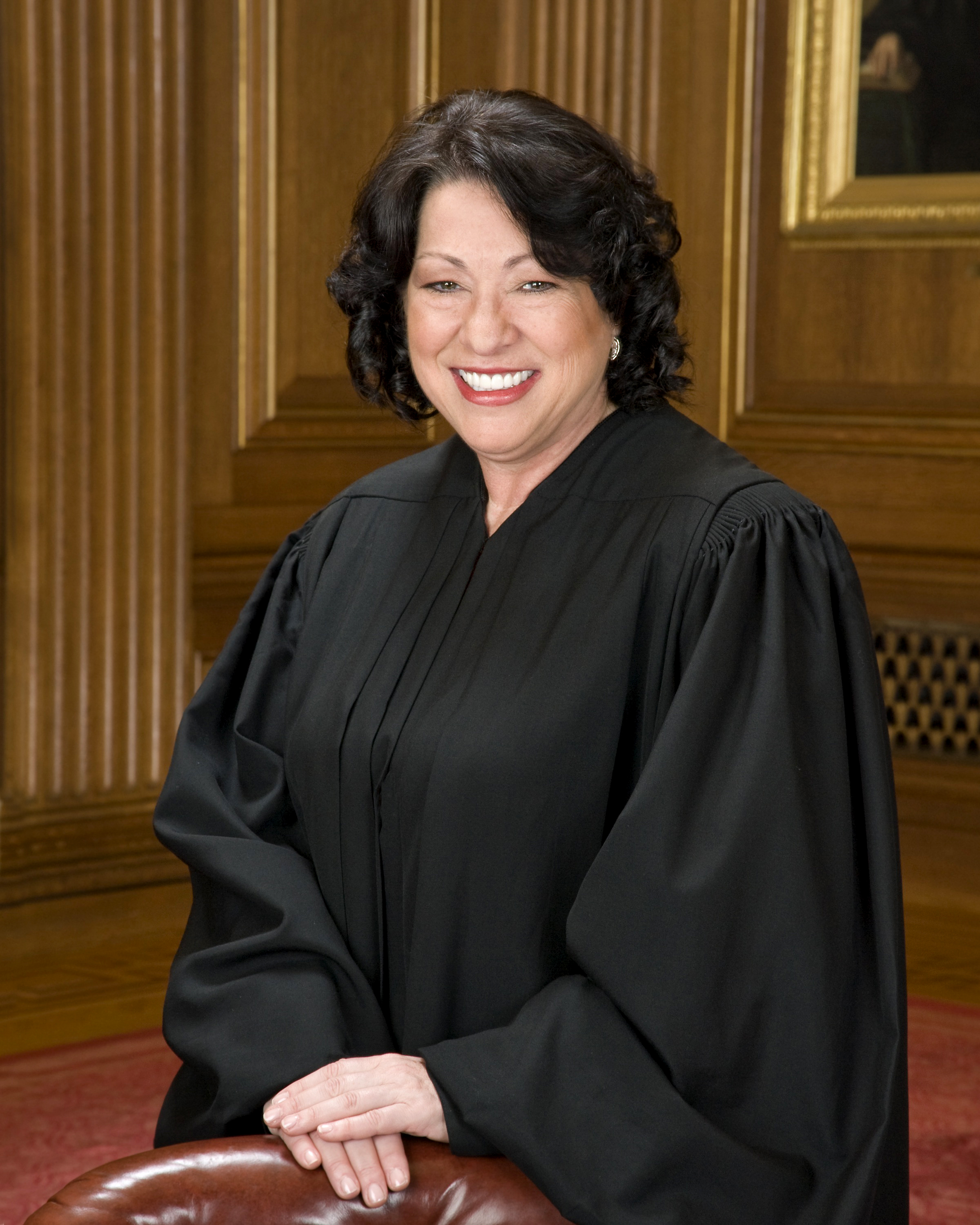

Sonia Sotomayor 2017 term statistics

7	Majority or plurality	7	Concurrence	3	Other
17	Dissent	0	Concurrence/dissent	Total =	34
Bench opinions = 23		Opinions relating to orders = 11		In-chambers opinions = 0
Unanimous opinions: 2		Most joined by: Ginsburg (19)		Least joined by: Alito (3 in full, 1 in part)

Type	Case	Citation	Issues	Joined by	Other opinions
	Truehill v. Florida	583 U.S. ___ (2017)	Eighth Amendment • death penalty • jury instructions	Ginsburg, Breyer	Breyer
Sotomayor dissented from the Court's denial of certiorari.
	Reeves v. Alabama	583 U.S. ___ (2017)	Sixth Amendment • ineffective assistance of counsel	Ginsburg, Kagan	
Sotomayor dissented from the Court's denial of certiorari.
	Floyd v. Alabama	583 U.S. ___ (2017)	Fourteenth Amendment • Equal Protection Clause • discriminatory peremptory challenges	Breyer	
Sotomayor filed a statement respecting the Court's denial of certiorari.
	District of Columbia v. Wesby	583 U.S. ___ (2018)	Fourth Amendment • probable cause • totality of the circumstances • qualified immunity		Thomas; Ginsburg
	National Assn. of Mfrs. v. Department of Defense	583 U.S. ___ (2018)	Clean Water Act • judicial review of EPA rulemaking • Waters of the United States Rule	Unanimous	
	Digital Realty Trust, Inc. v. Somers	583 U.S. ___ (2018)	Dodd–Frank Wall Street Reform and Consumer Protection Act • whistleblower protection	Breyer	Ginsburg; Thomas
	Rubin v. Islamic Republic of Iran	583 U.S. ___ (2018)	Foreign Sovereign Immunities Act • state sponsorship of terrorism • attachment	Roberts, Kennedy, Thomas, Ginsburg, Breyer, Alito, Gorsuch	
	Murphy v. Smith	583 U.S. ___ (2018)	Prison Litigation Reform Act • attorney's fees award apportionment	Ginsburg, Breyer, Kagan	Gorsuch
	Middleton v. Florida	583 U.S. ___ (2018)	Eighth Amendment • death penalty	Ginsburg	Breyer
Sotomayor dissented from the Court's denial of certiorari.
	Patchak v. Zinke	583 U.S. ___ (2018)	Indian Reorganization Act • Gun Lake Act • Article III		Thomas; Ginsburg; Breyer; Roberts
	Merit Management Group, LP v. FTI Consulting, Inc.	583 U.S. ___ (2018)	bankruptcy law • Chapter 11 • trustee power to set aside transfers • securities safe harbor	Unanimous	
	U.S. Bank N.A. v. Village at Lakeridge, LLC	583 U.S. ___ (2018)		Kennedy, Thomas, Gorsuch	Kagan; Kennedy
	Wessinger v. Vannoy	583 U.S. ___ (2018)			
Sotomayor dissented from the Court's denial of certiorari.
	Campbell v. Ohio	583 U.S. ___ (2018)	Eighth Amendment • life in prison without parole • nonappealability of state murder conviction		
Sotomayor filed a statement respecting the Court's denial of certiorari.
	Ayestas v. Davis	584 U.S. ___ (2018)	habeas corpus • court ordered funding for investigation	Ginsburg	Alito
	Kisela v. Hughes	584 U.S. ___ (2018)	Fourth Amendment • use of deadly force • qualified immunity	Ginsburg	per curiam
	Guardado v. Jones	584 U.S. ___ (2018)	Eighth Amendment • death penalty • jury instructions		
	Jesner v. Arab Bank, PLC	584 U.S. ___ (2018)	Alien Tort Statute • suits against foreign corporations	Ginsburg, Breyer, Kagan	Kennedy; Thomas; Alito; Gorsuch
	Collins v. Virginia	584 U.S. ___ (2018)	Fourth Amendment • motor vehicle exception to warrant requirement • search of curtilage	Roberts, Kennedy, Thomas, Ginsburg, Breyer, Kagan, Gorsuch	Thomas; Alito
	Hughes v. United States	584 U.S. ___ (2018)	United States Federal Sentencing Guidelines • eligibility for reduction in sentencing range		Kennedy; Roberts
	Lamar, Archer & Cofrin, LLP v. Appling	584 U.S. ___ (2018)	bankruptcy law • misrepresentations about single asset of debtor	Roberts, Kennedy, Ginsburg, Breyer, Kagan; Thomas, Alito, Gorsuch (in part)	
	Trevino v. Davis	584 U.S. ___ (2018)	Sixth Amendment • ineffective assistance of counsel • death penalty	Ginsburg	
	China Agritech, Inc. v. Resh	584 U.S. ___ (2018)	Federal Rules of Civil Procedure • denial of class certification • tolling of statute of limitations		Ginsburg
	Husted v. A. Philip Randolph Institute	584 U.S. ___ (2018)	National Voter Registration Act • Help America Vote Act of 2002 • deregistration for failure to vote		Alito; Thomas; Breyer
	Minnesota Voters Alliance v. Mansky	585 U.S. ___ (2018)	First Amendment • free speech • state law ban on political apparel at polling places	Breyer	Roberts
	Rosales-Mireles v. United States	585 U.S. ___ (2018)	United States Federal Sentencing Guidelines • Federal Rules of Criminal Procedure • errors in calculating sentencing range	Roberts, Kennedy, Ginsburg, Breyer, Kagan, Gorsuch	Thomas
	Kaczmar v. Florida	585 U.S. ___ (2018)	Eighth Amendment • death penalty • jury instructions		
Sotomayor dissented from the Court's denial of certiorari.
	Pereira v. Sessions	585 U.S. ___ (2018)	Illegal Immigration Reform and Immigrant Responsibility Act of 1996 • removal proceedings • effect of notice to appear on continuous presence	Roberts, Kennedy, Thomas, Ginsburg, Breyer, Kagan, Gorsuch	Kennedy; Alito
	Lucia v. SEC	585 U.S. ___ (2018)	SEC administrative law judges • Appointments Clause	Ginsburg	Kagan; Thomas; Breyer
	Abbott v. Perez	585 U.S. ___ (2018)	legislative redistricting • Voting Rights Act • Fourteenth Amendment • Equal Protection Clause • racial gerrymandering	Ginsburg, Breyer, Kagan	Alito; Thomas
	Peede v. Jones	585 U.S. ___ (2018)	Sixth Amendment • ineffective assistance of counsel	Ginsburg	
Sotomayor filed a statement respecting the Court's denial of certiorari.
	Trump v. Hawaii	585 U.S. ___ (2018)	Executive Order 13780 • Immigration and Nationality Act • Article III • First Amendment • Establishment Clause	Ginsburg	Roberts; Kennedy; Thomas; Breyer
	Janus v. State, County, and Municipal Employees	585 U.S. ___ (2018)	labor law • application of public sector union fees to non-members • First Amendment • free speech • freedom of association		Alito; Kagan
	Irick v. Tennessee	585 U.S. ___ (2018)	Eighth Amendment • death penalty • lethal injection		
Sotomayor dissented from the Court's denial of a stay.
