= 2017 term United States Supreme Court opinions of Samuel Alito =

The 2017 term of the Supreme Court of the United States began October 2, 2017, and concluded September 30, 2018. This was the thirteenth term of Associate Justice Samuel Alito's tenure on the Court.
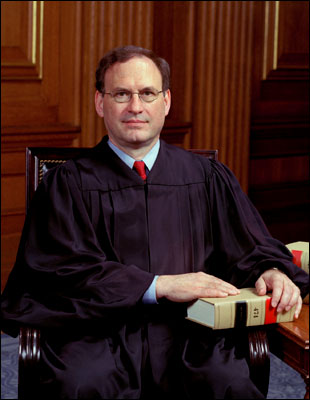

Samuel Alito 2017 term statistics

7	Majority or plurality	2	Concurrence	0	Other
7	Dissent	0	Concurrence/dissent	Total =	16
Bench opinions = 15		Opinions relating to orders = 1		In-chambers opinions = 0
Unanimous opinions: 2		Most joined by: Thomas (10 in full, 1 in part)		Least joined by: Ginsburg (2)

Type	Case	Citation	Issues	Joined by	Other opinions
	Class v. United States	583 U.S. ___ (2017)	challenge to constitutionality of statute after guilty plea • Federal Rule of Criminal Procedure 11	Kennedy, Thomas	Breyer
	Jennings v. Rodriguez	583 U.S. ___ (2018)		Roberts, Kennedy; Thomas, Sotomayor, Gorsuch (in part)	Thomas; Breyer
	Ayestas v. Davis	584 U.S. ___ (2018)	habeas corpus • court ordered funding for investigation	Unanimous	Sotomayor
	Jesner v. Arab Bank, PLC	584 U.S. ___ (2018)	Alien Tort Statute • suits against foreign corporations		Kennedy; Thomas; Gorsuch; Sotomayor
	Byrd v. United States	584 U.S. ___ (2018)	Fourth Amendment • search of rental vehicle • expectation of privacy of driver not listed on rental agreement		Kennedy; Thomas
	McCoy v. Louisiana	584 U.S. ___ (2018)	Sixth Amendment • defendant's right to insist counsel not admit guilt	Thomas, Gorsuch	Ginsburg
	Murphy v. National Collegiate Athletic Assn.	584 U.S. ___ (2018)	Professional and Amateur Sports Protection Act • state authorization of sports gambling • Tenth Amendment • anticommandeering doctrine	Roberts, Kennedy, Thomas, Kagan, Gorsuch; Breyer (in part)	Thomas; Breyer; Ginsburg
	Collins v. Virginia	584 U.S. ___ (2018)	Fourth Amendment • motor vehicle exception to warrant requirement • search of curtilage		Sotomayor; Thomas
	Koons v. United States	584 U.S. ___ (2018)	United States Federal Sentencing Guidelines • eligibility for reduction in sentencing ranges	Unanimous	
	Husted v. A. Philip Randolph Institute	584 U.S. ___ (2018)	National Voter Registration Act • Help America Vote Act of 2002 • deregistration for failure to vote	Roberts, Kennedy, Thomas, Gorsuch	Thomas; Breyer; Sotomayor
	Pereira v. Sessions	585 U.S. ___ (2018)	Illegal Immigration Reform and Immigrant Responsibility Act of 1996 • removal proceedings • effect of notice to appear on continuous presence		Sotomayor; Kennedy
	Carpenter v. United States	585 U.S. ___ (2018)	Fourth Amendment • acquisition of cell site records without search warrant	Thomas	Roberts; Kennedy; Thomas; Gorsuch
	Ortiz v. United States	585 U.S. ___ (2018)	Article III • appellate jurisdiction over U.S. Court of Appeals for the Armed Forces • Article II • Appointments Clause • eligibility to serve on Air Force Court of Criminal Appeals after appointment to Court of Military Commission Review	Gorsuch	Kagan; Thomas
	Abbott v. Perez	585 U.S. ___ (2018)	legislative redistricting • Voting Rights Act • Fourteenth Amendment • Equal Protection Clause • racial gerrymandering	Roberts, Kennedy, Thomas, Gorsuch	Thomas; Sotomayor
	Janus v. State, County, and Municipal Employees	585 U.S. ___ (2018)	labor law • application of public sector union fees to non-members • First Amendment • free speech • freedom of association	Roberts, Kennedy, Thomas, Gorsuch	Sotomayor; Kagan
	Kaushal v. Indiana	585 U.S. ___ (2018)		Thomas	
Alito dissented from the Court's grant of certiorari, vacatur, and remand.
