= 2017 term United States Supreme Court opinions of Neil Gorsuch =

The 2017 term of the Supreme Court of the United States began October 2, 2017, and concluded September 30, 2018. This was the second term of Associate Justice Neil Gorsuch's tenure on the Court.
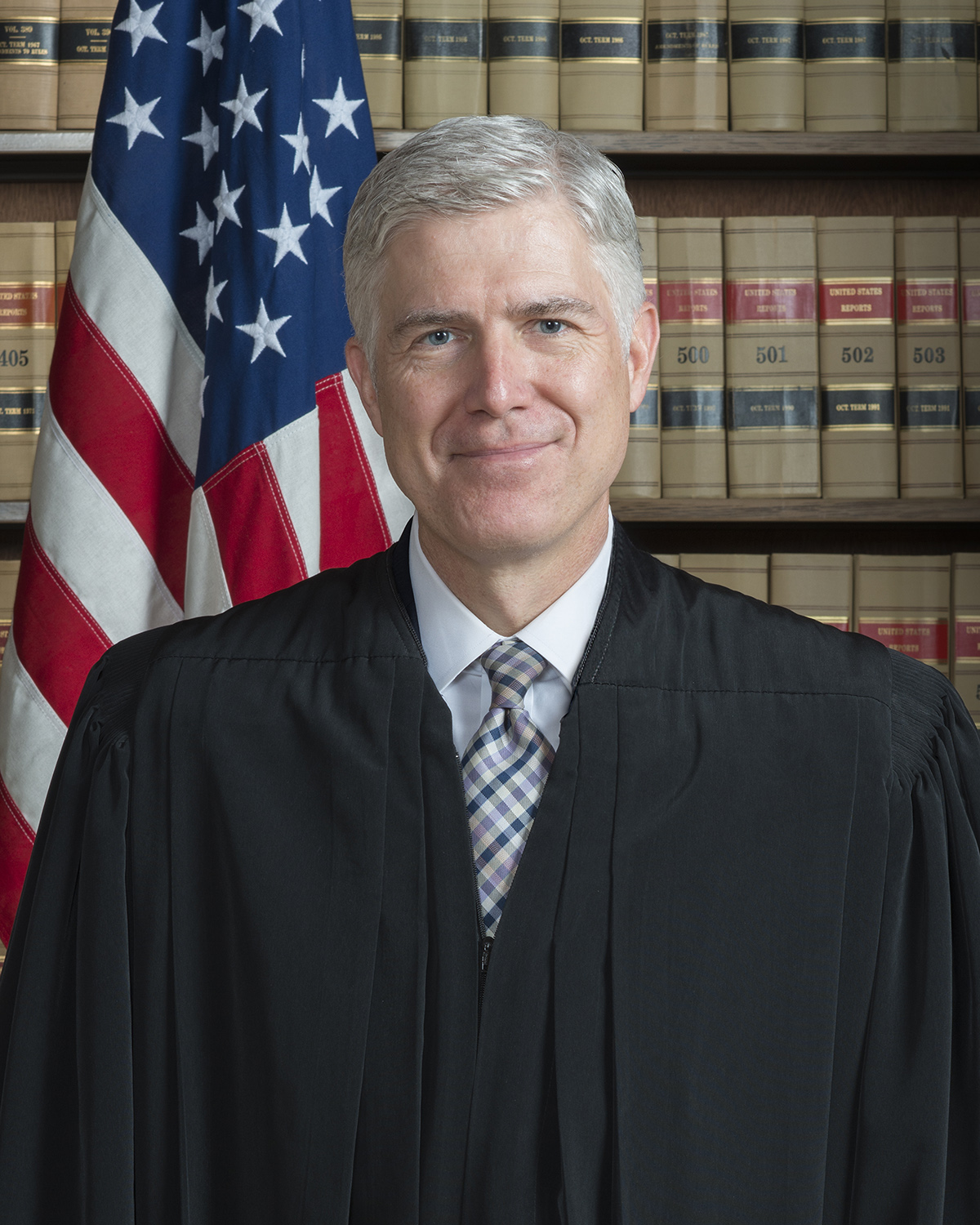

Neil Gorsuch 2017 term statistics

7	Majority or plurality	4	Concurrence	2	Other
6	Dissent	0	Concurrence/dissent	Total =	19
Bench opinions = 17		Opinions relating to orders = 2		In-chambers opinions = 0
Unanimous opinions: 1		Most joined by: Roberts, Alito (10)		Least joined by: Ginsburg, Sotomayor, Kagan (3)

Type	Case	Citation	Issues	Joined by	Other opinions
	Scenic America, Inc. v. Department of Transportation	583 U.S. ___ (2017)	agency interpretation of contract	Roberts, Alito	
Gorsuch filed a statement respecting the Court's denial of certiorari.
	Artis v. District of Columbia	583 U.S. ___ (2018)	supplemental jurisdiction • tolling of statute of limitations for refiling in state court	Kennedy, Thomas, Alito	Ginsburg
	Murphy v. Smith	583 U.S. ___ (2018)	Prison Litigation Reform Act • attorney's fees award apportionment	Roberts, Kennedy, Thomas, Alito	Sotomayor
	Texas v. New Mexico	583 U.S. ___ (2018)		Unanimous	
	Wilson v. Sellers	584 U.S. ___ (2018)	habeas corpus • review of unexplained state court decisions	Thomas, Alito	Breyer
	Sessions v. Dimaya	584 U.S. ___ (2018)	Immigration and Nationality Act • deportation for crime of violence • Due Process Clause • void for vagueness doctrine		Kagan; Roberts; Thomas
	Jesner v. Arab Bank, PLC	584 U.S. ___ (2018)	Alien Tort Statute • suits against foreign corporations		Kennedy; Thomas; Alito; Sotomayor
	Oil States Energy Services, LLC v. Greene's Energy Group, LLC	584 U.S. ___ (2018)	patent law • inter partes review • cancellation of patent by United States Patent and Trademark Office • Article III	Roberts	Thomas; Breyer
	SAS Institute Inc. v. Iancu	584 U.S. ___ (2018)	patent law • inter partes review	Roberts, Kennedy, Thomas, Alito	Ginsburg; Breyer
	Epic Systems Corp. v. Lewis	584 U.S. ___ (2018)	Federal Arbitration Act • Fair Labor Standards Act • concerted action in employment disputes	Roberts, Kennedy, Thomas, Alito	Thomas; Ginsburg
	Upper Skagit Tribe v. Lundgren	584 U.S. ___ (2018)	tribal sovereign immunity • immovable property exception	Roberts, Kennedy, Ginsburg, Breyer, Sotomayor, Kagan	Roberts; Thomas
	Masterpiece Cakeshop, Ltd. v. Colorado Civil Rights Comm'n	584 U.S. ___ (2018)	First Amendment • Free Exercise Clause • LGBT anti-discrimination law in public accommodations	Alito	Kennedy; Thomas; Kagan; Ginsburg
	Sveen v. Malin	584 U.S. ___ (2018)	Article I • Contracts Clause • automatic revocation of spouse as designated insurance beneficiary upon ending of marriage		Kagan
	South Dakota v. Wayfair, Inc.	585 U.S. ___ (2018)	state taxation of internet commerce • Commerce Clause • physical presence of out of state seller		Kennedy; Thomas; Roberts
	Wisconsin Central Ltd. v. United States	585 U.S. ___ (2018)	Railroad Retirement Tax Act of 1937 • employee stock option plans	Roberts, Kennedy, Thomas, Alito	Breyer
	Carpenter v. United States	585 U.S. ___ (2018)	Fourth Amendment • acquisition of cell site records without search warrant	Ginsburg, Breyer, Sotomayor, Kagan	Roberts; Kennedy; Thomas; Alito
	WesternGeco LLC v. ION Geophysical Corp.	585 U.S. ___ (2018)	patent law • recovery of foreign profits as infringement damages	Breyer	Thomas
	Currier v. Virginia	585 U.S. ___ (2018)	Fifth Amendment • Double Jeopardy Clause • conviction in second trial after consent to severance	Roberts, Thomas, Alito; Kennedy (in part)	Kennedy; Ginsburg
	E.I. DuPont de Nemours & Co. v. Smiley	585 U.S. ___ (2018)	administrative law • deference to agency interpretation of statute advanced in litigation	Roberts, Thomas	
Gorsuch filed a statement respecting the Court's denial of certiorari.
