= 2017 term United States Supreme Court opinions of Anthony Kennedy =

The 2017 term of the Supreme Court of the United States began October 2, 2017, and concluded September 30, 2018. This was the thirty-first and final term of Associate Justice Anthony Kennedy's tenure on the Court; Kennedy retired on July 31, 2018.
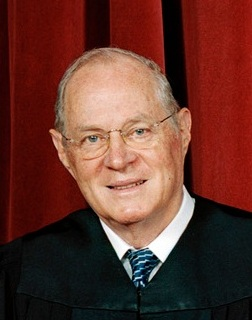

Anthony Kennedy 2017 term statistics

6	Majority or plurality	5	Concurrence	0	Other
2	Dissent	0	Concurrence/dissent	Total =	13
Bench opinions = 13		Opinions relating to orders = 0		In-chambers opinions = 0
Unanimous opinions: 1		Most joined by: Alito, Gorsuch (6 in full, 1 in part)		Least joined by: Thomas, Ginsburg, Breyer, Sotomayor (4)

Type	Case	Citation	Issues	Joined by	Other opinions
	U.S. Bank N.A. v. Village at Lakeridge, LLC	583 U.S. ___ (2018)			Kagan; Sotomayor
	Jesner v. Arab Bank, PLC	584 U.S. ___ (2018)	Alien Tort Statute • suits against foreign corporations	Roberts, Thomas; Alito, Gorsuch (in part)	Thomas; Alito; Gorsuch; Sotomayor
	Byrd v. United States	584 U.S. ___ (2018)	Fourth Amendment • search of rental vehicle • expectation of privacy of driver not listed on rental agreement	Unanimous	Thomas; Alito
	Masterpiece Cakeshop, Ltd. v. Colorado Civil Rights Comm'n	584 U.S. ___ (2018)	First Amendment • Free Exercise Clause • LGBT anti-discrimination law in public accommodations	Roberts, Breyer, Alito, Kagan, Gorsuch	Thomas; Kagan; Gorsuch; Ginsburg
	Hughes v. United States	585 U.S. ___ (2018)	United States Federal Sentencing Guidelines • eligibility for reduction in sentencing range	Ginsburg, Breyer, Sotomayor, Kagan, Gorsuch	Sotomayor; Roberts
	Lozman v. City of Riviera Beach	585 U.S. ___ (2018)	First Amendment • freedom of speech • retaliatory arrest • probable cause	Roberts, Ginsburg, Breyer, Alito, Sotomayor, Kagan, Gorsuch	Thomas
	Chavez-Meza v. United States	585 U.S. ___ (2018)	United States Federal Sentencing Guidelines • judicial explanation for sentence reduction	Sotomayor, Kagan	Breyer
	South Dakota v. Wayfair, Inc.	585 U.S. ___ (2018)	state taxation of internet commerce • Commerce Clause • physical presence of out of state seller	Thomas, Ginsburg, Alito, Gorsuch	Thomas; Gorsuch; Roberts
	Pereira v. Sessions	585 U.S. ___ (2018)	Illegal Immigration Reform and Immigrant Responsibility Act of 1996 • removal proceedings • effect of notice to appear on continuous presence		Sotomayor; Alito
	Carpenter v. United States	585 U.S. ___ (2018)	Fourth Amendment • acquisition of cell site records without search warrant	Thomas, Alito	Roberts; Thomas; Alito; Gorsuch
	Currier v. Virginia	585 U.S. ___ (2018)	Fifth Amendment • Double Jeopardy Clause • conviction in second trial after consent to severance		Gorsuch; Ginsburg
	Trump v. Hawaii	585 U.S. ___ (2018)	Executive Order 13780 • Immigration and Nationality Act • Article III • First Amendment • Establishment Clause		Roberts; Thomas; Breyer; Sotomayor
	National Institute of Family and Life Advocates v. Becerra	585 U.S. ___ (2018)	First Amendment • free speech • abortion • crisis pregnancy center notice and disclosure requirements regarding licensure and abortion service availability	Roberts, Alito, Gorsuch	Thomas; Breyer
