= 2017 term United States Supreme Court opinions of Ruth Bader Ginsburg =

The 2017 term of the Supreme Court of the United States began October 2, 2017, and concluded September 30, 2018. This was the twenty-fifth term of Associate Justice Ruth Bader Ginsburg's tenure on the Court.
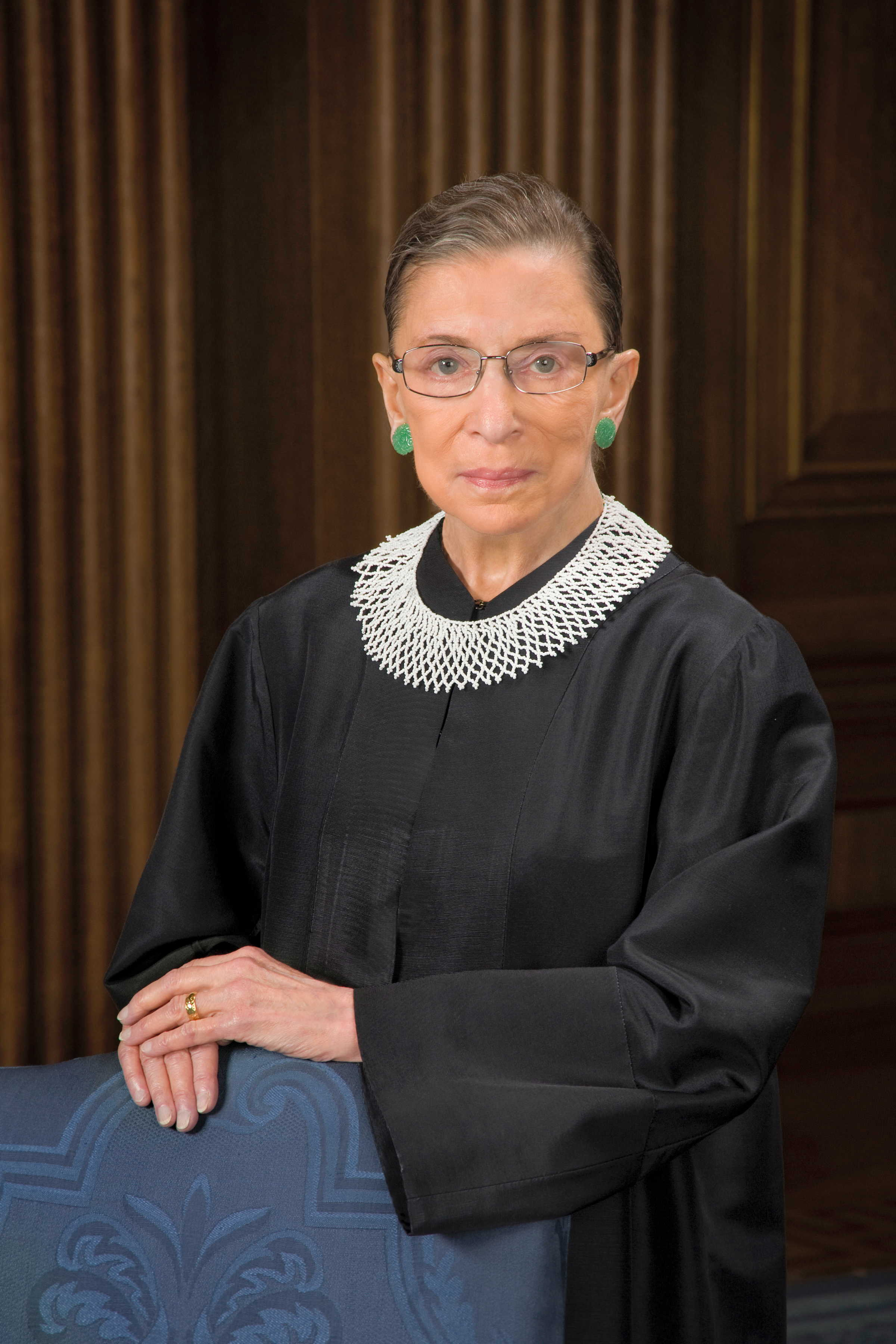

Ruth Bader Ginsburg 2017 term statistics

6	Majority or plurality	3	Concurrence	0	Other
7	Dissent	0	Concurrence/dissent	Total =	16
Bench opinions = 15		Opinions relating to orders = 1		In-chambers opinions = 0
Unanimous opinions: 2		Most joined by: Sotomayor (14)		Least joined by: Thomas, Alito, Gorsuch (3)

Type	Case	Citation	Issues	Joined by	Other opinions
	Dunn v. Madison	583 U.S. ___ (2017)	Eighth Amendment	Breyer, Sotomayor	per curiam; Breyer
	Hamer v. Neighborhood Housing Servs. of Chicago	583 U.S. ___ (2017)	limit on extensions of time to file notice of appeal • Federal Rules of Appellate Procedure	Unanimous	
	District of Columbia v. Wesby	583 U.S. ___ (2018)	Fourth Amendment • probable cause • totality of the circumstances • qualified immunity		Thomas; Sotomayor
	Artis v. District of Columbia	583 U.S. ___ (2018)	supplemental jurisdiction • tolling of statute of limitations for refiling in state court	Roberts, Breyer, Sotomayor, Kagan	Gorsuch
	Digital Realty Trust, Inc. v. Somers	583 U.S. ___ (2018)	Dodd–Frank Wall Street Reform and Consumer Protection Act • whistleblower protection	Roberts, Kennedy, Breyer, Sotomayor, Kagan	Thomas; Sotomayor
	Hamm v. Dunn	583 U.S. ___ (2018)	Eighth Amendment • death penalty	Sotomayor	Breyer
Ginsburg dissented from the Court's denial of a stay and of certiorari.
	Patchak v. Zinke	583 U.S. ___ (2018)	Indian Reorganization Act • Gun Lake Act • Article III	Sotomayor	Thomas; Breyer; Sotomayor; Roberts
	Encino Motorcars, LLC v. Navarro	584 U.S. ___ (2018)	Fair Labor Standards Act • exemption from overtime pay for salesmen	Breyer, Sotomayor, Kagan	Thomas
	SAS Institute Inc. v. Iancu	584 U.S. ___ (2018)	patent law • inter partes review	Breyer, Sotomayor, Kagan	Gorsuch; Breyer
	McCoy v. Louisiana	584 U.S. ___ (2018)	Sixth Amendment • defendant's right to insist counsel not admit guilt	Roberts, Kennedy, Breyer, Sotomayor, Kagan	Alito
	Murphy v. National Collegiate Athletic Assn.	584 U.S. ___ (2018)	Professional and Amateur Sports Protection Act • state authorization of sports gambling • Tenth Amendment • anticommandeering doctrine	Sotomayor; Breyer (in part)	Alito; Thomas; Breyer
	Epic Systems Corp. v. Lewis	584 U.S. ___ (2018)	Federal Arbitration Act • Fair Labor Standards Act • concerted action in employment disputes	Breyer, Sotomayor, Kagan	Gorsuch; Thomas
	Masterpiece Cakeshop, Ltd. v. Colorado Civil Rights Comm'n	584 U.S. ___ (2018)	First Amendment • Free Exercise Clause • LGBT anti-discrimination law in public accommodations	Sotomayor	Kennedy; Thomas; Kagan; Gorsuch
	China Agritech, Inc. v. Resh	584 U.S. ___ (2018)	Federal Rules of Civil Procedure • denial of class certification • tolling of statute of limitations	Roberts, Kennedy, Thomas, Breyer, Alito, Kagan, Gorsuch	Sotomayor
	Animal Science Products, Inc. v. Hebei Welcome Pharmaceutical Co.	585 U.S. ___ (2018)	Federal Rules of Civil Procedure • determination of foreign law • weight due to submission by foreign government	Unanimous	
	Currier v. Virginia	585 U.S. ___ (2018)	Fifth Amendment • Double Jeopardy Clause • conviction in second trial after consent to severance	Breyer, Sotomayor, Kagan	Gorsuch; Kennedy
