= 2017 term United States Supreme Court opinions of Elena Kagan =

The 2017 term of the Supreme Court of the United States began October 2, 2017, and concluded September 30, 2018. This was the eighth term of Associate Justice Elena Kagan's tenure on the Court.
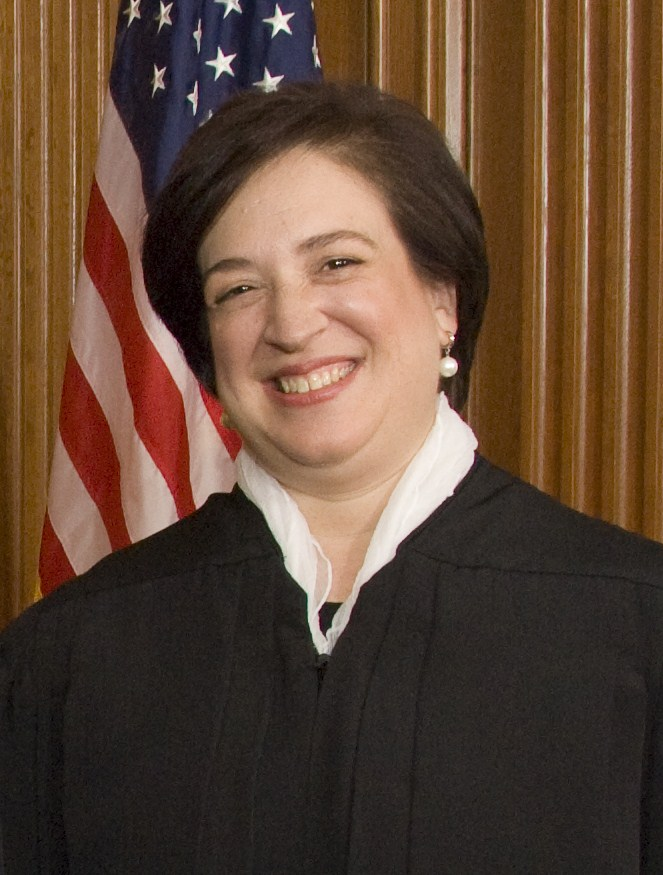

Elena Kagan 2017 term statistics

6	Majority or plurality	2	Concurrence	0	Other
1	Dissent	0	Concurrence/dissent	Total =	9
Bench opinions = 9		Opinions relating to orders = 0		In-chambers opinions = 0
Unanimous opinions: 2		Most joined by: Breyer (8)		Least joined by: Gorsuch (3 in full, 1 in part)

Type	Case	Citation	Issues	Joined by	Other opinions
	U.S. Bank N.A. v. Village at Lakeridge, LLC	583 U.S. ___ (2018)		Unanimous	Kennedy; Sotomayor
	Cyan, Inc. v. Beaver County Employees Retirement Fund	583 U.S. ___ (2018)	Securities Litigation Uniform Standards Act of 1998 • Securities Act of 1933 • state jurisdiction over covered class actions	Unanimous	
	Sessions v. Dimaya	584 U.S. ___ (2018)	Immigration and Nationality Act • deportation for crime of violence • Due Process Clause • void for vagueness doctrine	Ginsburg, Breyer, Sotomayor; Gorsuch (in part)	Gorsuch; Roberts; Thomas
	Masterpiece Cakeshop, Ltd. v. Colorado Civil Rights Comm'n	584 U.S. ___ (2018)	First Amendment • Free Exercise Clause • LGBT anti-discrimination law in public accommodations	Breyer	Kennedy; Thomas; Gorsuch; Ginsburg
	Sveen v. Malin	584 U.S. ___ (2018)	Article I • Contracts Clause • automatic revocation of spouse as designated insurance beneficiary upon ending of marriage	Roberts, Kennedy, Thomas, Ginsburg, Breyer, Alito, Sotomayor	Gorsuch
	Gill v. Whitford	585 U.S. ___ (2018)	partisan gerrymandering • Article III • standing • Equal Protection	Ginsburg, Breyer, Sotomayor	Roberts; Thomas
	Lucia v. SEC	585 U.S. ___ (2018)	SEC administrative law judges • Appointments Clause	Roberts, Kennedy, Thomas, Alito, Gorsuch	Thomas; Breyer; Sotomayor
	Ortiz v. United States	585 U.S. ___ (2018)	Article III • appellate jurisdiction over U.S. Court of Appeals for the Armed Forces • Article II • Appointments Clause • eligibility to serve on Air Force Court of Criminal Appeals after appointment to Court of Military Commission Review	Roberts, Kennedy, Thomas, Ginsburg, Breyer, Sotomayor	Thomas; Alito
	Janus v. State, County, and Municipal Employees	585 U.S. ___ (2018)	labor law • application of public sector union fees to non-members • First Amendment • free speech • freedom of association	Ginsburg, Breyer, Sotomayor	Alito; Sotomayor
