= 2017 term United States Supreme Court opinions of John Roberts =

The 2017 term of the Supreme Court of the United States began October 2, 2017, and concluded September 30, 2018. This was the thirteenth term of Chief Justice John Roberts's tenure on the Court.
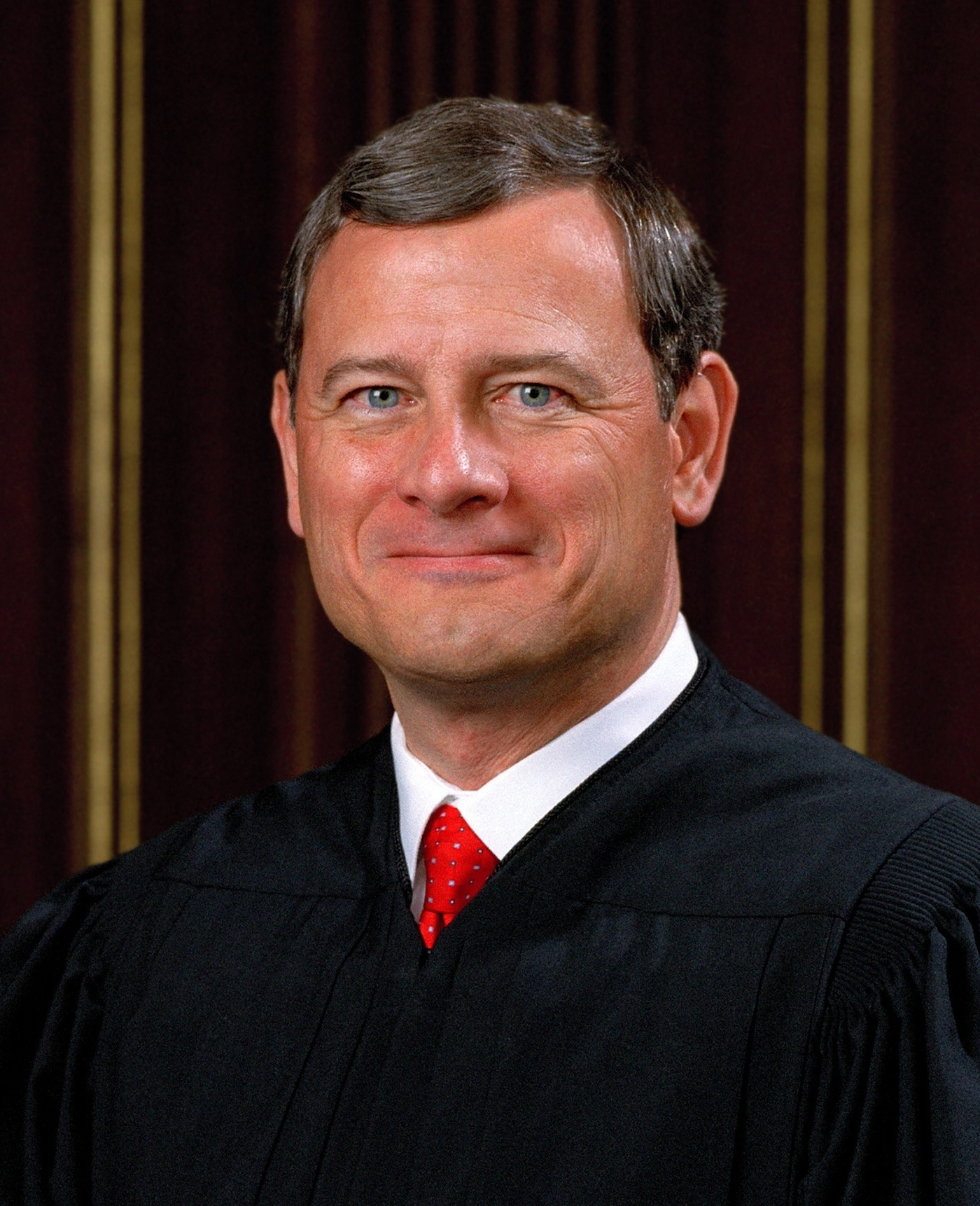

John Roberts 2017 term statistics

6	Majority or plurality	1	Concurrence	0	Other
4	Dissent	0	Concurrence/dissent	Total =	11
Bench opinions = 11		Opinions relating to orders = 0		In-chambers opinions = 0
Unanimous opinions: 2		Most joined by: Kennedy (8)		Least joined by: Ginsburg, Breyer, Sotomayor (5)

Type	Case	Citation	Issues	Joined by	Other opinions
	Patchak v. Zinke	583 U.S. ___ (2018)	Indian Reorganization Act • Gun Lake Act • Article III	Kennedy, Gorsuch	Thomas; Ginsburg; Breyer; Sotomayor
	Hall v. Hall	584 U.S. ___ (2018)	Federal Rules of Civil Procedure • appealability after resolution of consolidated case	Unanimous	
	Sessions v. Dimaya	584 U.S. ___ (2018)	Immigration and Nationality Act • deportation for crime of violence • Due Process Clause • void for vagueness doctrine	Kennedy, Thomas, Alito	Kagan; Gorsuch; Thomas
	United States v. Sanchez-Gomez	584 U.S. ___ (2018)	full restraint of defendants in pretrial proceedings • Article III • mootness	Unanimous	
	Upper Skagit Tribe v. Lundgren	584 U.S. ___ (2018)	tribal sovereign immunity • immovable property exception	Kennedy	Gorsuch; Thomas
	Hughes v. United States	584 U.S. ___ (2018)	United States Federal Sentencing Guidelines • eligibility for reduction in sentencing range	Thomas, Alito	Kennedy; Sotomayor
	Minnesota Voters Alliance v. Mansky	585 U.S. ___ (2018)	First Amendment • free speech • state law ban on political apparel at polling places	Kennedy, Thomas, Ginsburg, Alito, Kagan, Gorsuch	Sotomayor
	Gill v. Whitford	585 U.S. ___ (2018)	partisan gerrymandering • Article III • standing • Equal Protection	Kennedy, Ginsburg, Breyer, Alito, Sotomayor, Kagan; Thomas, Gorsuch (in part)	Thomas; Kagan
	South Dakota v. Wayfair, Inc.	585 U.S. ___ (2018)	state taxation of internet commerce • Commerce Clause • physical presence of out of state seller	Breyer, Sotomayor, Kagan	Kennedy; Thomas; Gorsuch
	Carpenter v. United States	585 U.S. ___ (2018)	Fourth Amendment • acquisition of cell site records without search warrant	Ginsburg, Breyer, Sotomayor, Kagan	Kennedy; Thomas; Alito; Gorsuch
	Trump v. Hawaii	585 U.S. ___ (2018)	Executive Order 13780 • Immigration and Nationality Act • Article III • First Amendment • Establishment Clause	Kennedy, Thomas, Alito, Gorsuch	Kennedy; Thomas; Breyer; Sotomayor
