= Lagos v. United States =

- Supreme Court of the United States

Decided May 29, 2018
- Full case name: Lagos v. United States
- Docket no.: 16-1519
- Citations: 584 U.S. ___ (more)

Holding
- The words "investigation" and "proceedings" in the Mandatory Victims Restitution Act are limited to government investigations and criminal proceedings and do not include private investigations and civil or bankruptcy proceedings.

Court membership
- Chief Justice John Roberts Associate Justices Anthony Kennedy · Clarence Thomas; Ruth Bader Ginsburg · Stephen Breyer; Samuel Alito · Sonia Sotomayor; Elena Kagan · Neil Gorsuch

Case opinion
- Majority: Breyer, joined by unanimous

Laws applied
- Mandatory Victims Restitution Act of 1996

Lagos v. United States, 584 U.S. ___ (2018), was a United States Supreme Court case in which the court held that the words "investigation" and "proceedings" in the Mandatory Victims Restitution Act of 1996 are limited to government investigations and criminal proceedings and do not include private investigations and civil or bankruptcy proceedings.

== Background ==
Sergio Fernando Lagos was convicted of using a company he controlled to defraud a lender of tens of millions of dollars. After the fraudulent scheme came to light and Lagos' company went bankrupt, the lender conducted a private investigation of Lagos' fraud and participated as a party in the company's bankruptcy proceedings. Between the private investigation and the bankruptcy proceedings, the lender spent nearly $5 million in legal, accounting, and consulting fees related to the fraud. After Lagos pleaded guilty to federal wire fraud charges, the federal district court ordered him to pay restitution to the lender for those fees. The Fifth Circuit Court of Appeals affirmed, holding that such restitution was required by the Mandatory Victims Restitution Act of 1996, which requires defendants convicted of certain federal offenses, including wire fraud, to, among other things, "reimburse the victim for lost income and necessary child care, transportation, and other expenses incurred during participation in the investigation or prosecution of the offense or attendance at proceedings related to the offense."

== Opinion of the court ==
The Supreme Court issued an opinion on May 29, 2018.
