= Class v. United States =

- Supreme Court of the United States

Argued October 4, 2017 Decided February 21, 2018
- Full case name: Class v. United States
- Docket no.: 16-424
- Citations: 583 U.S. 174 (more) 138 S. Ct. 798; 200 L. Ed. 2d 37

Case history
- Prior: United States v. Class, 38 F. Supp. 3d 19 (D.D.C. 2014); affirmed, No. 15-3015 (D.C. Cir. July 05, 2016); cert. granted, 137 S. Ct. 1065 (2017).

Holding
- A guilty plea, by itself, does not bar a federal criminal defendant from challenging the constitutionality of his statute of conviction on direct appeal.

Court membership
- Chief Justice John Roberts Associate Justices Anthony Kennedy · Clarence Thomas; Ruth Bader Ginsburg · Stephen Breyer; Samuel Alito · Sonia Sotomayor; Elena Kagan · Neil Gorsuch

Case opinions
- Majority: Breyer, joined by Roberts, Ginsburg, Sotomayor, Kagan, Gorsuch
- Dissent: Alito, joined by Kennedy, Thomas

Class v. United States, 583 U.S. 174 (2018), is a United States Supreme Court case on challenges to the constitutionality of a federal law by a defendant who has already pleaded guilty.

== Background ==
A federal grand jury indicted petitioner, Rodney Class, for possessing firearms in his locked jeep, which was parked on the grounds of the United States Capitol in Washington, D. C. See 40 U.S.C. § 5104(e)(1) (“An individual . . . may not carry . . . on the Grounds or in any of the Capitol Buildings a firearm”). Appearing pro se, Class asked the District Court to dismiss the indictment. He alleged that the statute, § 5104(e), violates the Second Amendment and the Due Process Clause. After the District Court dismissed both claims, Class pleaded guilty to “Possession of a Firearm on U. S. Capitol Grounds, in violation of 40 U.S.C. § 5104(e).” App. 30. A written plea agreement set forth the terms of Class’ guilty plea, including several categories of rights that he agreed to waive. The agreement said nothing about the right to challenge on direct appeal the constitutionality of the statute of conviction. After conducting a hearing pursuant to Rule 11(b) of the Federal Rules of Criminal Procedure, the District Court accepted Class’ guilty plea and sentenced him. Soon thereafter, Class sought to raise his constitutional claims on direct appeal. The Court of Appeals held that Class could not do so because, by pleading guilty, he had waived his constitutional claims.

== Opinion of the Court ==
Oral arguments
Recording of oral arguments before the Supreme Court.

A guilty plea, by itself, does not bar a federal criminal defendant from challenging the constitutionality of his statute of conviction on direct appeal.

== See also ==
- 2017 term opinions of the Supreme Court of the United States
