= Koons v. United States =

- Supreme Court of the United States

Decided June 4, 2018
- Full case name: Koons v. United States
- Docket no.: 17-5716
- Citations: 584 U.S. ___ (more)

Holding
- A person who has been sentenced based on a mandatory minimum sentence with a statutory justification for a longer sentence, rather a justification within the Guidelines, is not entitled to sentence reductions under subsequent amendments to the Guidelines.

Court membership
- Chief Justice John Roberts Associate Justices Anthony Kennedy · Clarence Thomas; Ruth Bader Ginsburg · Stephen Breyer; Samuel Alito · Sonia Sotomayor; Elena Kagan · Neil Gorsuch

Case opinion
- Majority: Alito, joined by unanimous

Koons v. United States, 584 U.S. ___ (2018), was a United States Supreme Court case in which the court held that a person who has been sentenced based on a mandatory minimum sentence with a statutory justification for a longer sentence, rather a justification within the Guidelines, is not entitled to sentence reductions under subsequent amendments to the Guidelines.

== Background ==
The five petitioners in this case pleaded guilty to drug conspiracy charges that subjected them to mandatory minimum sentences. Before imposing their sentences, the federal district court calculated their advisory Guidelines ranges. However, because the top end of the Guidelines ranges fell below the mandatory minimums, the court concluded that the mandatory minimums superseded the Guidelines ranges. After discarding these ranges, the court departed downward from the mandatory minimums to reflect the convicted people's substantial assistance to the government in prosecuting other drug offenders. In settling on the final sentences, the court considered the relevant "substantial assistance factors" set out in the Guidelines, but it did not consider the original Guidelines ranges that it had earlier discarded.

After these people were sentenced, the Sentencing Commission amended the Guidelines and reduced the base offense levels for certain drug offenses, including those for which petitioners were convicted. The petitioners sought sentence reductions under a law that makes defendants eligible for a sentence reduction if they were sentenced "based on a sentencing range" that was later lowered by the Sentencing Commission. The courts below held that petitioners were not eligible because they could not show that their sentences were "based on" the now-lowered Guidelines ranges.

== Opinion of the court ==
The Supreme Court issued a unanimous opinion on June 4, 2018. It held that the petitioners did not qualify for sentence reductions under §3582(c)(2) because their sentences were not "based on" their lowered guideline ranges but, instead, were "based on" their mandatory minimums and on their substantial assistance to the government.
