= Rosales-Mireles v. United States =

- Supreme Court of the United States

Decided June 18, 2018
- Full case name: Rosales-Mireles v. United States
- Docket no.: 16-9493
- Citations: 585 U.S. 129 (more)

Holding
- A miscalculation of a Guidelines sentencing range that has been determined to be plain and to affect a defendant's substantial rights calls for a court of appeals to exercise its discretion to vacate the defendant's sentence in the ordinary case.

Court membership
- Chief Justice John Roberts Associate Justices Anthony Kennedy · Clarence Thomas; Ruth Bader Ginsburg · Stephen Breyer; Samuel Alito · Sonia Sotomayor; Elena Kagan · Neil Gorsuch

Case opinions
- Majority: Sotomayor
- Dissent: Kagan

Laws applied
- Fed. R. Crim. Pro. 52(b)

Rosales-Mireles v. United States, 585 U.S. 129 (2018), was a United States Supreme Court case in which the court held that a miscalculation of a Guidelines sentencing range that has been determined to be plain and to affect a defendant's substantial rights calls for a court of appeals to exercise its discretion to vacate the defendant's sentence in the ordinary case.

== Background ==
Each year, federal district courts sentence thousands of individuals to imprisonment for violations of federal law. To help ensure certainty and fairness in those sentences, district courts are required to consider the advisory United States Federal Sentencing Guidelines. Prior to sentencing, the United States Probation Office prepares a pre-sentence investigation report to help the court determine the applicable Guidelines range. Ultimately, the district court is responsible for ensuring the Guidelines range it considers is correct. At times, however, an error in the calculation of the Guidelines range goes unnoticed by the court and the parties. On appeal, such errors not raised in the district court may be remedied under Federal Rule of Criminal Procedure 52(b), provided that, as established in United States v. Olano: (1) the error was not "intentionally relinquished or abandoned," (2) the error is plain, and (3) the error "affected the defendant's substantial rights." If those conditions are met, "the court of appeals should exercise its discretion to correct the forfeited error if the error seriously affects the fairness, integrity or public reputation of judicial proceedings." This last consideration is often called Olano's fourth prong. The issue in Rosales-Mireles was whether a Guidelines error that satisfied Olano's first three conditions warrants relief under the fourth prong.

Florencio Rosales-Mireles pleaded guilty to illegal reentry into the United States. In calculating the Guidelines range, the Probation Office's pre-sentence report mistakenly counted a state misdemeanor conviction twice. As a result, the report yielded a Guidelines range of 77 to 96 months, when the correctly calculated range would have been 70 to 87 months. Rosales-Mireles did not object to the error in the district court, which relied on the miscalculated Guidelines range and sentenced him to 78 months of imprisonment. On appeal, Rosales-Mireles challenged the incorrect Guidelines range for the first time. The Fifth Circuit Court of Appeals found that the Guidelines error was plain and that it affected Rosales-Mireles' substantial rights because there was a "reasonable probability that he would have been subject to a different sentence but for the error." The Fifth Circuit nevertheless declined to remand the case for resentencing, concluding that Rosales-Mireles had not established that the error would seriously affect the fairness, integrity, or public reputation of judicial proceedings because neither the error nor that the resulting sentence "would shock the conscience."
