= Ohio v. American Express Co. =

- Supreme Court of the United States

Argued February 26, 2018 Decided June 25, 2018
- Full case name: Ohio, et al., Petitioners v. American Express Company, et al.
- Docket no.: 16-1454
- Citations: 585 U.S. 529 (more) 138 S. Ct. 2274; 201 L. Ed. 2d 678

Case history
- Prior: United States v. Am. Express Co., 88 F. Supp. 3d 143 (E.D.N.Y. 2015); reversed, 838 F.3d 179 (2d Cir. 2016); cert. granted, 138 S. Ct. 355 (2017).

Holding
- American Express' steering provisions do not violate federal antitrust law.

Court membership
- Chief Justice John Roberts Associate Justices Anthony Kennedy · Clarence Thomas; Ruth Bader Ginsburg · Stephen Breyer; Samuel Alito · Sonia Sotomayor; Elena Kagan · Neil Gorsuch

Case opinions
- Majority: Thomas, joined by Roberts, Kennedy, Alito, Gorsuch
- Dissent: Breyer, joined by Ginsburg, Sotomayor, Kagan

Ohio v. American Express Co., 585 U.S. 529 (2018), was a United States Supreme Court case regarding the nature of antitrust law in relationship to two-sided markets. The case specifically involves policies set by some credit card banks that prevented merchants from steering customers to use cards from other issuers with lower transaction fees, forcing merchants to pay higher transaction fees to the banks. While Visa and MasterCard settled with the United States Department of Justice in 2010, American Express defended its practice by arguing that the anti-steering policies benefited its cardholders, the higher transaction fees helping to maintain member services. While the Department of Justice and several states prevailed during a District Court trial in 2015 citing harm to the merchants, the Appeals Court reversed the District Court's ruling in 2016 by ruling that the plaintiffs had not shown harm to both sides of the two-side market, a novel test in antitrust law. This decision led to some of the states to appeal to the Supreme Court. The case was heard by the Court in February 2018.

The Court issued its decision on June 25, 2018, affirming the Appeals Court's ruling that steering provisions do not violate antitrust laws. With this decision upheld, the two-market test could be applied to other venues, particularly to the high tech sector where two-side markets are common.

== Background ==
Within the United States, credit card transactions are controlled by four main financial institutions: Visa, MasterCard, American Express, and Discover, making it an oligopoly. Credit cards work as a two-sided market, with the institutions providing benefits to consumers (by allowing them to access lines of credit to make instant purchases) and merchants (by providing them the funds for that purchase instantly). The institutions support this by taking a transaction fee off the merchant's funds, with the fee varying between each institution.

Of the four institutions, Discover was the latest offering, created in 1985. To try to compete with the other three institutions on the market, Discover developed a low-cost transaction fee model compared to the other three institutions, which gave incentive for merchants to steer customers towards using Discover cards. To counter this, Visa, MasterCard, and American Express all developed anti-steering contractual language to merchants that prevented them from steering customers into using other cards; this included informing their customers of the different fees and offering discounts and other incentives by using other cards. This also affected the promotion of other cards offered within the institution's network, such as using debit cards with lower fees compared to credit cards.

== District Court ==
In October 2010, the United States Department of Justice (DOJ), after receiving numerous complaints that the anti-steering language violated antitrust laws and following two years of investigation, filed a civil antitrust lawsuit against Visa, MasterCard, and American Express in United States District Court for the Eastern District of New York. The DOJ asserted that with US$35 billion in transaction fees each year, the practices of these three institutions prevented merchants from reducing their own costs of business, and requiring them to raise prices to consumers. The DOJ's suit was joined by the states of Connecticut, Iowa, Maryland, Michigan, Missouri, Ohio and Texas. Visa and MasterCard immediately settled with the DOJ without any fines, agreeing to remove the anti-steering language imposed on merchants. However, American Express defended its practice, and continued to fight the lawsuit. During the pre-trial period, additional states also joined the other plaintiffs, including Arizona, Idaho, Illinois, New Hampshire, Montana, Nebraska, Rhode Island, Tennessee, Vermont, and Utah; Hawaii had also joined but later dismissed its claims before the trial.

In February 2015, following a seven-week trial hearing, the District Court ruled in favor of the DOJ and states, finding that American Express's anti-steering terms violated antitrust laws. Judge Nicholas Garaufis wrote that the language was "an unlawful restraint on trade" and considered the language to violate Section 1 of the Sherman Antitrust Act. American Express asserted that it would appeal the decision. Garaufis issued a permanent injunction on American Express from enforcing its anti-steering language in April 2015.

== Appeals Court ==
American Express's appeal was heard in the 2nd Circuit Appeals Court in December 2015. After the oral testimony, the Appeals Court lifted the injunction placed by Judge Garaufis. The full ruling of the Appeals Court in September 2016 reversed the lower court ruling; the Appeals Court argued that the plaintiffs had not shown harm that American Express's anti-steering had to merchants or consumers, and that the government would have been required to show how higher prices to merchants set by the transaction fees would harm consumer or not benefit them. The Appeals Court also argued that merchants overburdened by high transaction fees could simply cease accepting that card. This decision was considered to have created a new type of rule that could make it difficult to seek antitrust litigation; with credit cards being a two-sided market serving two distinct sets of customers, a successful antitrust argument would have to show how both sides of the market were harmed.

The DOJ petitioned the Appeals Court to reconsider the case at an en banc hearing, believing that their decision looked at both merchants and consumers, instead of focusing only on the impact to merchants alone, and that the onus should be for American Express to show how its anti-steering clauses would promote competition. The Appeals Court refused to reconsider its decision by January 2017.

== Supreme Court ==
While the Department of Justice and other states dropped the suit, eleven states continued to appeal to the Supreme Court of the United States and filed petition to hear the case in June 2017; Ohio (leading the petition for appeal), Connecticut, Idaho, Illinois, Iowa, Maryland, Michigan, Montana, Rhode Island, Utah and Vermont. The States' appeal raised questions of the Second Circuit's decision in conflict with past case law, and that Supreme Court guidance was needed on how antitrust measures should be applied a two-sided market, which was becoming a significant portion of the national economy. The Supreme Court accepted the case in October 2017.

Oral arguments
Recording of oral arguments before the Supreme Court.

Oral arguments were heard on February 26, 2018; court observers reported that both sides were equally asked tough questions, and it was difficult to determine which direction the Court would take. Questions asked in the oral session were principally from Justices Sonia Sotomayor and Neil Gorsuch.

The Court issued its 5–4 decision on June 25, 2018, affirming the Appeals Court's ruling, and that the American Express steering provisions did not violate antitrust law. The majority opinion, written by Justice Clarence Thomas and joined by Justices Roberts, Kennedy, Alito, and Gorsuch, found that the petitioners had not shown any harm of the steering provisions that otherwise would not have occurred if no steering provisions were in place, nor have the provisions stifled competition in the market. Justice Stephen Breyer wrote the dissenting opinion, joined by Justices Ginsburg, Sotomayor, and Kagan, taking issue with how the rule of reason had been applied for this case throughout its judicial history.
