= Murphy v. Smith =

- Supreme Court of the United States

Decided February 21, 2018
- Full case name: Murphy v. Smith
- Docket no.: 16-1067
- Citations: 583 U.S. 220 (more)

Holding
- An incarcerated person who is awarded attorney's fees in connection to their successful civil rights case must contribute up to 25% of their own winnings to paying that award.

Court membership
- Chief Justice John Roberts Associate Justices Anthony Kennedy · Clarence Thomas; Ruth Bader Ginsburg · Stephen Breyer; Samuel Alito · Sonia Sotomayor; Elena Kagan · Neil Gorsuch

Case opinions
- Majority: Gorsuch
- Dissent: Sotomayor, joined by Ginsburg, Breyer, Kagan

Laws applied
- Prison Litigation Reform Act

Murphy v. Smith, 583 U.S. 220 (2018), was a United States Supreme Court case in which the court held that an incarcerated person who is awarded attorney's fees in connection to their successful civil rights case must contribute up to 25% of their own winnings to paying that award.

== Background ==
Charles Murphy, an incarcerated person, won a federal civil rights suit against two of his prison guards, including an award of attorney’s fees. Pursuant to the Prison Litigation Reform Act's §1997e(d)(2), which provides that in such cases "a portion of the [incarcerated person's] judgment (not to exceed 25 percent) shall be applied to satisfy the amount of attorney's fees awarded against the defendant," the district court ordered Murphy to pay 10% of his judgment toward the fee award, leaving defendants responsible for the remainder. The Seventh Circuit reversed, holding that §1997e(d)(2) required the district court to exhaust 25% of the prisoner’s judgment before demanding payment from the defendants.
