= Chavez-Meza v. United States =

- Supreme Court of the United States

Decided June 18, 2018
- Full case name: Chavez-Meza v. United States
- Docket no.: 17-5639
- Citations: 585 U.S. 109 (more)

Holding
- When the record as a whole demonstrates the judge had a reasoned basis for his decision, the judge's use of generic boilerplate to explain their choice of a sentence reduction under the Guidelines is adequate.

Court membership
- Chief Justice John Roberts Associate Justices Anthony Kennedy · Clarence Thomas; Ruth Bader Ginsburg · Stephen Breyer; Samuel Alito · Sonia Sotomayor; Elena Kagan · Neil Gorsuch

Chavez-Meza v. United States, 585 U.S. 109 (2018), was a United States Supreme Court case in which the court held that when the record as a whole demonstrates the judge had a reasoned basis for his decision, the judge's use of generic boilerplate to explain their choice of a sentence reduction under the Guidelines is adequate.

== Background ==
The United States Federal Sentencing Guidelines require a sentencing judge to first identify the recommended Guidelines sentencing range based on certain offender and offense characteristics. The judge might choose a penalty within that Guidelines range, or the judge may "depart" or "vary" from the Guidelines and select a sentence outside the range. Either way, the judge must take into account certain statutory sentencing factors and must "state in open court the reasons for [imposing] the particular sentence." But, when it comes to how detailed that statement of reasons must be, the law leaves much to the judge's own professional judgment. The explanation need not be lengthy, especially where a matter is conceptually simple and the record makes clear that the sentencing judge considered the evidence and arguments.

Adaucto Chavez-Meza pleaded guilty to possessing methamphetamine with intent to distribute. The judge reviewed the Guidelines, determined the range to be 135 to 168 months, and imposed a sentence at the bottom of the range. The Sentencing Commission later lowered the relevant range to 108 to 135 months, and Chavez-Meza sought a sentence reduction. Chavez-Meza asked the judge to reduce his sentence to the bottom of the new range, but the judge reduced petitioner's sentence to 114 months instead. The order was entered on a form certifying that the judge had "considered" petitioner's "motion" and had "tak[en] into account" the statuory factors and the relevant Guidelines policy statement. On appeal, Chavez-Meza argued the sentencing judge did not adequately explain why he rejected Chavez-Meza's request for a 108-month sentence. The Tenth Circuit Court of Appeals affirmed.

== See also ==
- Rita v. United States
