= Artis v. District of Columbia =

- Supreme Court of the United States

Decided January 22, 2018
- Full case name: Artis v. District of Columbia
- Docket no.: 16-460
- Citations: 583 U.S. ___ (more)

Holding
- The limitations period for state claims filed in federal court is suspended while such claims are pending in federal court and for 30 days after dismissal by the federal court.

Court membership
- Chief Justice John Roberts Associate Justices Anthony Kennedy · Clarence Thomas; Ruth Bader Ginsburg · Stephen Breyer; Samuel Alito · Sonia Sotomayor; Elena Kagan · Neil Gorsuch

Case opinions
- Majority: Ginsburg
- Dissent: Gorsuch, joined by Kennedy, Thomas, Alito

Laws applied
- 28 U.S.C. § 1367(d)

Artis v. District of Columbia, 583 U.S. ___ (2018), was a United States Supreme Court case in which the court held that the limitations period for state claims filed in federal court is suspended while such claims are pending in federal court and for 30 days after dismissal by the federal court.

== Background ==
Federal district courts may exercise supplemental jurisdiction over state claims not otherwise within their adjudicatory authority if those claims are "part of the same case or controversy" as the federal claims the plaintiff asserts. When a district court dismisses all claims independently qualifying for the exercise of federal jurisdiction, it ordinarily also dismisses all related state claims. Section 1367(d) provides that the "period of limitations for" refiling in state court a state claim so dismissed "shall be tolled while the claim is pending [in federal court] and for a period of 30 days after it is dismissed unless State law provides for a longer tolling period."

When Stephanie C. Artis filed a federal-court suit against the District of Columbia (D.C.), alleging a federal employment-discrimination claim and three allied claims under D.C. law, nearly two years remained on the applicable statute of limitations for the D.C.-law violations. Two and a half years later, the Federal District Court ruled against Artis on her sole federal claim and dismissed the D.C.-law claims under §1367(c). Fifty-nine days after the dismissal, Artis refiled her state-law claims in the D.C. Superior Court, but that court dismissed them as time barred. The D.C. Court of Appeals affirmed, holding that §1367(d) accorded Artis only a 30-day grace period to refile in state court and rejecting her argument that the word "tolled" in §1367(d) means that the limitations period is suspended during the pendency of the federal suit.
