= Wisconsin Central Ltd. v. United States =

- Supreme Court of the United States

Decided June 21, 2018
- Full case name: Wisconsin Central Ltd. v. United States
- Docket no.: 17-530
- Citations: 585 U.S. 274 (more)

Holding
- Employee stock options are not taxable "compensation" under the Railroad Retirement Tax Act because they are not "money remuneration".

Court membership
- Chief Justice John Roberts Associate Justices Anthony Kennedy · Clarence Thomas; Ruth Bader Ginsburg · Stephen Breyer; Samuel Alito · Sonia Sotomayor; Elena Kagan · Neil Gorsuch

Case opinions
- Majority: Gorsuch
- Dissent: Breyer, joined by Ginsburg, Sotomayor, Kagan

Laws applied
- Railroad Retirement Tax Act of 1937

Wisconsin Central Ltd. v. United States, 585 U.S. 274 (2018), was a United States Supreme Court case in which the court held that employee stock options are not taxable "compensation" under the Railroad Retirement Tax Act because they are not "money remuneration".

== Background ==
As the Great Depression took its toll, struggling railroad pension funds reached the brink of insolvency. During that time before the rise of the modern Interstate Highway System, privately owned railroads employed large numbers of Americans and provided services vital to the nation's commerce. To address the emergency, Congress adopted the Railroad Retirement Tax Act of 1937. That legislation federalized private railroad pension plans. Under the law, private railroads and their employees pay a tax based on employees' incomes. In return, the federal government provides employees a pension often more generous than the social security system supplies employees in other industries.

At the time of the act's adoption, railroads compensated employees not just with money but also with food, lodging, railroad tickets, and the like. Because railroads typically did not count these in-kind benefits when calculating an employee's pension on retirement, neither did Congress in its new statutory pension scheme. Nor did Congress seek to tax these in-kind benefits. Instead, it limited its levies to employee "compensation," and defined that term to capture only "any form of money remuneration."

To encourage employee performance and to align employee and corporate goals, some railroads have (like employers in many fields) adopted employee stock-option plans. The government argued in this case that these stock options qualify as a form of "compensation" subject to taxation under the act. In its view, stock options could easily be converted into money and so qualified as "money remuneration". The railroads and their employees replied that stock options were not "money remuneration" and reminded the Court that when Congress passed the act it sought to mimic existing industry pension practices that generally took no notice of in-kind benefits.

== Opinion of the Court ==
Justice Neil Gorsuch wrote the majority opinion. In it, he announced that the language of the statute was "clear enough" to avoid the need to apply Chevron deference.

== Subsequent developments ==
Commentators saw Gorsuch's use of "clear enough" in this case as a sign of the end of Chevron deference. After Loper Bright Enterprises v. Raimondo and Relentless, Inc. v. Department of Commerce in 2024, Chevron U.S.A., Inc. v. Natural Resources Defense Council, Inc. was overruled.
