= Pereira v. Sessions =

- Supreme Court of the United States

Argued April 23–, 2018 Decided June 21, 2018
- Full case name: Wesley Fonseca Pereira v. Jefferson B. Sessions III, Attorney General
- Docket no.: 17-459
- Citations: 585 U.S. 198 (more) 138 S. ct. 2105
- Reargument: Reargument
- Opinion announcement: Opinion announcement

Holding
- A Notice to Appear that does not inform a noncitizen when and where to appear for a removal proceeding is not valid under 8 U.S. Code § 1229(b) and therefore does not trigger the stop-time rule which is used to calculate the ten year continuous presence requirement for non-lawful permanent residents.

Court membership
- Chief Justice John Roberts Associate Justices Anthony Kennedy · Clarence Thomas; Ruth Bader Ginsburg · Stephen Breyer; Samuel Alito · Sonia Sotomayor; Elena Kagan · Neil Gorsuch

Case opinions
- Majority: Sotomayor, joined by Roberts, Kennedy, Thomas, Ginsburg, Breyer, Kagan, Gorsuch
- Concurrence: Kennedy
- Dissent: Alito

Pereira v. Sessions, Attorney General, 585 U.S. 198 (2018), is a United States Supreme Court case regarding immigration. In an 8–1 majority, the Court reversed a lower court's decision by holding that a Notice to Appear that does not inform a noncitizen when and where to appear for a removal proceeding is not valid under 8 U.S. Code § 1229(b) and therefore does not trigger the stop-time rule which is used to calculate the ten year continuous presence requirement for non-lawful permanent residents. The majority opinion was authored by Justice Sonia Sotomayor while the dissent was authored by Justice Samuel Alito.

== Background ==
Wescley Fonseca Pereira, a native and citizen of Brazil, was lawfully admitted to the United States in December 2000 as a temporary non-immigrant visitor. He overstayed his visa and in 2006 was arrested in Massachusetts for operating a vehicle while intoxicated. While he was detained on May 31, 2006, he was served a Notice to Appear by the Department of Homeland Security (DHS) which alerted him that removal proceedings were being initiated against him since he overstayed his visa and listed consequences if he did not appear. However, the notice did not specify a time or place for the hearing. It only ordered him to appear before an Immigration Judge in Boston "on a date to be set at a time to be set."

Over a year later on August 9, 2007, DHS filed the 2006 notice with the Boston Immigration Court. The Immigration Court attempted to mail Pereira an additional notice stating that the time and date for his removal hearing was set for October 3, 2007, at 9:30AM, but it was sent to Pereira's street address rather than the post office box he had provided to DHS and therefore it was returned undeliverable. Pereira never appeared to his hearing since he did not receive the notice and so the Immigration Court ordered that he be removed in his absence. Unaware of the removal order, Pereira remained a resident in the United States.

In 2013, after Pereira had been residing continuously in the country for over ten years, he was arrested for a minor motor vehicle violation and detained once again by DHS. Even though Pereira demonstrated that he had not received the Immigration Court's 2007 notice which set out the specific date and time of his hearing, they re-opened the removal proceedings. Pereira then applied for cancellation of removal, "arguing that the stop-time rule" of the Immigration and Nationality Act "was not triggered by DHS's initial 2006 notice because the document lacked information about the time and date of his removal hearing. The Immigration Court disagreed and instead stated that the law did not require that DHS put a certain date or time on the Notice to Appear to make it effective and trigger the stop-time rule. Therefore, the Immigration Court ruled that Pereira could not meet the 10-year continuous physical-presence requirement under 8 U.S. Code § 1229(b) which made him ineligible for cancellation of removal.

The Board of Immigration Appeals dismissed Pereira's appeal. Adhering to its precedent in The Matter of Judith Elma Camarillo (2011), which stated that under the stop-time rule any period of continuous residence of a noncitizen applying for cancellation of removal is deemed to end upon the service of a Notice to Appear regardless of whether it includes a time and date for the initial hearing, the Board of Immigration Appeals agreed with the Immigration Court and ruled that the 2006 Notice to Appear triggered the stop-time rule and therefore that Pereira was ineligible for cancellation of removal. Pereira's case made it to the Supreme Court and arguments began on April 23, 2018.

== Ruling ==
The Supreme Court ruled in an 8-1 majority that when a noncitizen "receives a document called a Notice to Appear, and where that document does not have a time or place listed for the removal proceedings, then it is not a valid Notice to Appear, and thus it does not 'stop time' for purposes of establishing the noncitizen's continuous physical presence in the United States." This question about whether such a notice triggered the stop-time rule was crucial because Pereira sought cancellation of removal relief, which is only available to noncitizens who have had a continuous physical presence in the United States for 10 years. Authored by Justice Sonia Sotomayor, the Court's opinion held that "a notice that does not inform a noncitizen when and where to appear for a removal proceedings" is not valid and does not trigger the stop-time rule. The ruling followed, according to the Court, "inescapably and unambiguously" from "the plain text, the statutory context, and common sense."

== Significance ==
This ruling was important because nearly all cases filed in from 2015 to 2018 were initiated by Notice to Appear documents that did not include the time and place of the proceeding. Therefore, it created a path for noncitizens to make an appeal who are in a similar situation. However, in The Matter of German Bermudez-Cota (2018), the Board of Immigration Appeals ruled that a Notice to Appear with no time or place still vests Immigration Judge with jurisdiction over the removal proceedings as long as a Notice to Appear specifying the time and place of the hearing is sent to the noncitizen at a later date. In a controversial move, as a response to this decision immigration courts in some instances are now scheduling hundreds of artificial removal hearings per day, such as in San Antonio, Texas to trigger the stop-time rule even though they cannot get through every hearing. This case is also notable because the Supreme Court referred to individuals in removal proceedings as noncitizens and not aliens, except when quoting statues or regulations that use the term.
