= Byrd v. United States =

- Supreme Court of the United States

Argued January 9, 2018 Decided May 14, 2018
- Full case name: Terrence Byrd, Petitioner v. United States
- Docket no.: 16-1371
- Citations: 584 U.S. 395 (more) 138 S. Ct. 1518; 200 L. Ed. 2d 805

Case history
- Prior: Affirmed, United States v. Byrd, 679 F. App'x 146 (3d Cir. 2017); Cert. granted, 138 S. Ct. 54 (2017).
- Subsequent: Affirmed, United States v. Byrd (3d Cir. 2018).

Questions presented
- A police officer may not conduct a suspicionless and warrantless search of a car if the driver has a reasonable expectation of privacy in the car-i.e., an expectation of privacy that society accepts as reasonable. Does a driver have a reasonable expectation of privacy in a rental car when he has the renter's permission to drive the car but is not listed as an authorized driver on the rental agreement?

Holding
- Drivers of rental cars have rights protecting them from unconstitutional searches by police, even if the drivers are not listed on the rental agreement.

Court membership
- Chief Justice John Roberts Associate Justices Anthony Kennedy · Clarence Thomas; Ruth Bader Ginsburg · Stephen Breyer; Samuel Alito · Sonia Sotomayor; Elena Kagan · Neil Gorsuch

Case opinions
- Majority: Kennedy, joined by unanimous
- Concurrence: Thomas, joined by Gorsuch
- Concurrence: Alito

Byrd v. United States, 584 U.S. 395 (2018), was a United States Supreme Court case that held that drivers of rental cars have rights protecting them from unconstitutional searches by police, even if the drivers are not listed on the rental agreement.

== Background ==
In mid-2014, Terrance Byrd was driving a rental car along a Pennsylvania highway. The car had been rented from Budget Rent a Car by his long-time girlfriend and driven with her consent, but Byrd's name was not listed as an authorized driver of the car on the rental agreement. A state trooper with the Pennsylvania State Police, David Long, pulled Byrd over for a small traffic violation, and Byrd's mannerisms raised Long's suspicions. Further checks of Byrd's history revealed past criminal convictions and an arrest warrant in New Jersey. As Byrd was not listed on the rental agreement, Long initiated a search of the car without Byrd's consent and found several pounds of heroin and body armor in the trunk. Byrd was arrested and tried on federal drug charges in the United States District Court for the Middle District of Pennsylvania.

Byrd's lawyers attempted to have the search of the car dismissed as evidence, as it violated Byrd's rights against unreasonable searches under the Fourth Amendment defined under the motor vehicle exception, but the judge denied that he had such rights since by the Budget rental contract, Byrd was not an authorized driver. Byrd pleaded guilty to the charges but left the option to appeal the conviction. He was sentenced to ten years in prison.

Byrd's lawyers appealed to the United States Court of Appeals for the Third Circuit, which was heard and reviewed in late 2016. The Third Circuit acknowledged there was a split among the Circuit Courts as to the right of privacy related to rental cars, and previous cases of the Third Circuit had ruled that such drivers did not have expectations of privacy. The Third Circuit upheld the District Court's decision on that basis.

== Supreme Court ==
Byrd's lawyers submitted a petition for writ of certiorari with the Supreme Court in March 2017. The petition focused on the question of whether an otherwise well-established expectation of privacy for a driver of a car is nullified in the case of a rental car where the driver is not on the rental contract. The Court agreed to hear the case in September 2017.

Oral arguments were heard on January 9, 2018. Oral arguments in another Fourth Amendment case relating to vehicles and rights to privacy, Collins v. Virginia, were heard the same day.

The Supreme Court issued its ruling on May 14, 2018. In a unanimous decision favoring Byrd, Justice Anthony Kennedy wrote, "The mere fact that a driver in lawful possession or control of a rental car is not listed on the rental agreement will not defeat his or her otherwise reasonable expectation of privacy". Kennedy added that there can be numerous reasons for a driver unlisted on a rental contract needing to drive the rental car, and the government had not shown that whether the simple breach of the rental contract would affect the expectation of privacy. Kennedy's decision stated that there remained two issues that the Supreme Court remanded back to the lower courts: whether Long had probable cause to search the car in the first place and whether Byrd "intentionally used a third party as a straw man in a calculated plan to mislead the rental company from the very outset, all to aid him in committing a crime."
