= Jennings v. Rodriguez =

- Supreme Court of the United States

Argued November 30, 2016 Reargued October 3, 2017 Decided February 27, 2018
- Full case name: David Jennings et al. v. Alejandro Rodriguez et al.
- Docket no.: 15-1204
- Citations: 583 U.S. 281 (more) 138 S. Ct. 830; 200 L. Ed. 2d 122

Case history
- Prior: Rodriguez v. Robbins, 804 F.3d 1060 (9th Cir. 2015); cert. granted, 136 S. Ct. 2489 (2016).

Holding
- Detained immigrants do not have a statutory right to periodic bond hearings.

Court membership
- Chief Justice John Roberts Associate Justices Anthony Kennedy · Clarence Thomas; Ruth Bader Ginsburg · Stephen Breyer; Samuel Alito · Sonia Sotomayor; Elena Kagan · Neil Gorsuch

Case opinions
- Majority: Alito, joined by Roberts, Kennedy; Thomas, Gorsuch (all but Part II); Sotomayor (Part III–C)
- Concurrence: Thomas (in part), joined by Gorsuch (except footnote 6)
- Dissent: Breyer, joined by Ginsburg, Sotomayor
- Kagan took no part in the consideration or decision of the case.

Jennings v. Rodriguez, 583 U.S. 281 (2018), is a United States Supreme Court case in which the Court held that detained immigrants do not have a statutory right to periodic bond hearings.

The case was brought about by Mexican citizen and lawful U.S. permanent resident Alex Rodriguez. After a 2004 incident, he was detained on the grounds of 8 U.S.C. 1226, which states that under a warrant by the Attorney General immigrants may be arrested and detained while their case status is decided. Rodriguez challenged this justification in 2007 through habeas corpus, claiming immigrants had the right to a bond hearing without "prolonged" detention according to 8 U.S.C. 1225. The United States Court of Appeals for the Ninth Circuit affirmed his entry deciding detained immigrants had the right to a periodic hearing if one had not already been held after 6 months.

The Court of Appeal's decision was reversed by the Supreme Court in a plurality opinion after granting a writ of certiorari in June 2016. Justice Samuel Alito wrote for the majority and concluded that no provision of 8 U.S.C. 1225 limits length of detention to six months, or suggests length of detention should be a factor when deciding on release of a detained immigrant.
