= Upper Skagit Tribe v. Lundgren =

- Supreme Court of the United States

Decided May 21, 2018
- Full case name: Upper Skagit Tribe v. Lundgren
- Docket no.: 17-387
- Citations: 584 U.S. ___ (more)

Holding
- Yakima County v. Yakima Nation did not address the scope of Native Nations' sovereign immunity for in rem lawsuits.

Court membership
- Chief Justice John Roberts Associate Justices Anthony Kennedy · Clarence Thomas; Ruth Bader Ginsburg · Stephen Breyer; Samuel Alito · Sonia Sotomayor; Elena Kagan · Neil Gorsuch

Case opinions
- Majority: Gorsuch
- Concurrence: Roberts, joined by Kennedy
- Dissent: Thomas, joined by Alito

Upper Skagit Tribe v. Lundgren, 584 U.S. ___ (2018), was a United States Supreme Court case in which the court held that Yakima County v. Yakima Nation did not address the scope of tribal sovereign immunity for in rem lawsuits.

== Background ==
The Upper Skagit Indian Tribe purchased a roughly 40-acre plot of land and then commissioned a boundary survey. The survey convinced the Tribe that about an acre of its land lay on the other side of a boundary fence between its land and land owned by Sharline and Ray Lundgren. The Lundgrens filed a quiet title action in Washington Superior Court, invoking the doctrines of adverse possession and mutual acquiescence, but the Tribe asserted sovereign immunity from the suit. Ultimately, the Washington Supreme Court rejected the Tribe's immunity claim and ruled for the Lundgrens, reasoning that, under County of Yakima v. Confederated Tribes and Bands of Yakima Nation, tribal sovereign immunity did not apply to in rem suits.

== Opinion of the court ==
The Supreme Court issued an opinion written by Justice Neil Gorsuch on May 21, 2018. The Lundgrens acknowledged that Yakima did not address tribal sovereign immunity and attempted to make a different argument to the court. The Lundgrens argued that the Tribe could not assert sovereign immunity because this suit related to immovable property located in Washington State, purchased by the Tribe in the same manner as a private individual. Because this alternative argument did not emerge until late in this case, the Supreme Court exercised caution and remanded the case so the argument would be heard by the Washington Supreme Court first.
