= District of Columbia v. Wesby =

- Supreme Court of the United States

Argued October 4, 2017 Decided January 22, 2018
- Full case name: District of Columbia, et al. v. Theodore Wesby, et al.
- Docket no.: 15-1485
- Citations: 583 U.S. 48 (more) 138 S. Ct. 577; 199 L. Ed. 2d 453

Case history
- Prior: Wesby v. District of Columbia, 841 F. Supp. 2d 20 (D.D.C. 2012); affirmed, 765 F.3d 13, 412 U.S. App. D.C. 246 (D.C. Cir. 2014); rehearing en banc denied, 816 F.3d 96, 421 U.S. App. D.C. 391 (D.C. Cir. 2016); cert. granted, 137 S. Ct. 826 (2017).

Holding
- The officers had probable cause to arrest the partygoers and were entitled to qualified immunity.

Court membership
- Chief Justice John Roberts Associate Justices Anthony Kennedy · Clarence Thomas; Ruth Bader Ginsburg · Stephen Breyer; Samuel Alito · Sonia Sotomayor; Elena Kagan · Neil Gorsuch

Case opinions
- Majority: Thomas, joined by Roberts, Kennedy, Breyer, Alito, Kagan, Gorsuch
- Concurrence: Sotomayor (in part)
- Concurrence: Ginsburg (in judgment)

District of Columbia v. Wesby, 583 U.S. 48 (2018), was a United States Supreme Court case in which the Court held that police officers had probable cause to arrest those attending a party in Washington, D.C.

== Facts and procedural history ==
In March 2008, police officers in Washington, D.C. were called to a residence due to noise complaints. When asked, guests gave conflicting reasons for why they were in the residence, and the homeowner ultimately indicated he had not given permission for the party and that the party's host, "Peaches," had not yet signed a lease for the residence. Though the 21 attendees were arrested, charges were later dropped.

A jury later awarded those arrested $680,000 in damage, and the U.S. Court of Appeals for the D.C. Circuit determined that the arresting officers did not have immunity from legal repercussions for the arrests. The Supreme Court reversed and remanded this decision, and held that the officers had probable cause to arrest the party attendees and were entitled to qualified immunity.

Justice Ginsburg wrote a solo concurrence saying, "The Court’s jurisprudence, I am concerned, sets the balance too heavily in favor of police unaccountability to the detriment of Fourth Amendment protection. [...] I would leave open, for reexamination in a future case, whether a police officer’s reason for acting, in at least some circumstances, should factor into the Fourth Amendment inquiry."
