= Digital Realty Trust, Inc. v. Somers =

- Supreme Court of the United States

Argued November 28, 2017 Decided February 21, 2018
- Full case name: Digital Realty Trust, Inc. v. Paul Somers
- Docket no.: 16-1276
- Citations: 583 U.S. ___ (more) 138 S. Ct. 767; 200 L. Ed. 2d 15

Case history
- Prior: 850 F.3d 1045 (9th Cir. 2017); cert. granted, 137 S. Ct. 2300 (2017).
- Subsequent: On remand, 886 F.3d 1300 (9th Cir. 2018).

Holding
- "Whistleblower" status and associated protections as defined by Sarbanes-Oxley and Dodd-Frank only apply in cases where the whistleblower has reported malfeasance directly to the Securities and Exchange Commission.

Court membership
- Chief Justice John Roberts Associate Justices Anthony Kennedy · Clarence Thomas; Ruth Bader Ginsburg · Stephen Breyer; Samuel Alito · Sonia Sotomayor; Elena Kagan · Neil Gorsuch

Case opinions
- Majority: Ginsburg, joined by Roberts, Kennedy, Breyer, Sotomayor, Kagan
- Concurrence: Sotomayor, joined by Breyer
- Concurrence: Thomas (in part), joined by Alito, Gorsuch

Digital Realty Trust, Inc. v. Somers, 583 U.S. ___ (2018), was a United States Supreme Court case in which the Court ruled that "whistleblower" status and associated protections as defined by Sarbanes-Oxley and Dodd-Frank only apply in cases where the whistleblower has reported malfeasance directly to the Securities and Exchange Commission.
