= Currier v. Virginia =

- Supreme Court of the United States

Decided June 22, 2018
- Full case name: Currier v. Virginia
- Docket no.: 16-1348
- Citations: 585 U.S. 493 (more)

Holding
- If a criminal defendant consents to sever their case into multiple trials, they waive issue preclusion in the subsequent trials.

Court membership
- Chief Justice John Roberts Associate Justices Anthony Kennedy · Clarence Thomas; Ruth Bader Ginsburg · Stephen Breyer; Samuel Alito · Sonia Sotomayor; Elena Kagan · Neil Gorsuch

Case opinions
- Majority: Gorsuch
- Concurrence: Kennedy (in part)
- Dissent: Ginsburg, joined by Breyer, Sotomayor, Kagan

Currier v. Virginia, 585 U.S. 493 (2018), was a United States Supreme Court case in which the court held that if a criminal defendant consents to sever their case into multiple trials, they waive issue preclusion in the subsequent trials. Thus, the government may relitigate their allegations in the subsequent trial even if the defendant was acquitted in the first, and the second trial does not violate double jeopardy.

== Background ==
Michael Currier was indicted for burglary, grand larceny, and unlawful possession of a firearm by a convicted felon. Because the prosecution could introduce evidence of Currier's prior burglary and larceny convictions to prove the felon-in-possession charge, and worried that evidence might prejudice the jury's consideration of the other charges, Currier and the government agreed to a severance and asked the court to try the burglary and larceny charges first, followed by a second trial on the felon-in-possession charge. At the first trial, Currier was acquitted. He then sought to stop the second trial, arguing that it would amount to double jeopardy. Alternatively, he asked the court to prohibit the state from relitigating at the second trial any issue resolved in his favor at the first. The trial court denied his requests and allowed the second trial to proceed unfettered. The jury convicted him on the felon-in-possession charge. The Virginia Court of Appeals rejected his double jeopardy arguments, and the Virginia Supreme Court summarily affirmed.
