= U.S. Bank N.A. v. Village at Lakeridge, LLC =

- Supreme Court of the United States

Decided March 5, 2018
- Full case name: U.S. Bank N.A. v. Village at Lakeridge, LLC
- Docket no.: 15-1509
- Citations: 583 U.S. ___ (more)

Holding
- Clear error is the proper standard for review of a determination that a purchaser was not a non-statutory insider for purposes of approving a cramdown plan of reorganization.

Court membership
- Chief Justice John Roberts Associate Justices Anthony Kennedy · Clarence Thomas; Ruth Bader Ginsburg · Stephen Breyer; Samuel Alito · Sonia Sotomayor; Elena Kagan · Neil Gorsuch

Case opinions
- Majority: Kagan, joined by unanimous
- Concurrence: Kennedy
- Concurrence: Sotomayor, joined by Kennedy, Thomas, Gorsuch

U.S. Bank N.A. v. Village at Lakeridge, LLC, 583 U.S. ___ (2018), was a United States Supreme Court case in which the court held that clear error is the proper standard for review of a determination that a purchaser was not a non-statutory insider for purposes of approving a cramdown plan of reorganization.

== Background ==
Lakeridge was a corporate entity with a single owner, MBP Equity Partners. When Lakeridge filed for Chapter 11 bankruptcy, it had a pair of substantial debts: It owed U.S. Bank over $10 million and MBP another $2.76 million. Lakeridge submitted a reorganization plan, proposing to impair the interests of both U.S. Bank and MBP. U.S. Bank refused the offer, thus blocking Lakeridge's option for reorganization through a fully consensual plan. Lakeridge then turned to the so-called "cramdown" plan option for imposing a plan impairing the interests of a non-consenting class of creditors. Among the prerequisites for judicial approval of such a plan is that another impaired class of creditors has consented to it. But, crucially, the consent of a creditor who is also an "insider" of the debtor does not count for that purpose. The Bankruptcy Code's definition of an insider "includes" any director, officer, or "person in control" of the entity. Courts devised tests for identifying other, so-called "non-statutory" insiders, focusing, in whole or in part, on whether a person's transactions with the debtor were at arm's length.

MBP (an insider of Lakeridge) could not provide the partial agreement needed for a cramdown plan, and Lakeridge's reorganization was thus impeded. MBP sought to transfer its claim against Lakeridge to a non-insider who could agree to the cramdown plan. Kathleen Bartlett, an MBP board member and Lakeridge officer, offered MBP's claim to Robert Rabkin, a retired surgeon, for $5,000. Rabkin purchased the claim and consented to Lakeridge's proposed reorganization. U.S. Bank objected, arguing that Rabkin was a non-statutory insider because he had a "romantic" relationship with Bartlett and the purchase was not an arm's-length transaction. The Bankruptcy Court rejected U.S. Bank's argument. The Ninth Circuit Court of Appeals affirmed. Viewing the Bankruptcy Court's decision as one based on a finding that the relevant transaction was conducted at arm's length, the Ninth Circuit held that that finding was entitled to clear-error review, and could not be reversed under that deferential standard.

== Opinion of the court ==
On March 5, 2018, the Supreme Court issued a unanimous decision delivered by Justice Kagan, holding that appellate courts must review a bankruptcy court's determination of "non-statutory insider" status under the clearly erroneous standard rather than de novo review. The central legal question was what standard of appellate review applies when determining whether a creditor qualifies as a non-statutory insider under 11 U.S.C. § 1129(a)(10), which requires that at least one impaired class of creditors accept a Chapter 11 reorganization plan without counting votes cast by insiders. The Court concluded that insider status is primarily a factual inquiry, warranting deference to the bankruptcy court's findings unless clearly erroneous.

In reaching this conclusion, the Court rejected the Ninth Circuit's categorical approach, which had treated insider determinations as questions of law subject to de novo review. Instead, the majority applied the test articulated in In re U.S. Insulation Products, Inc. and Armstrong v. Armstead, focusing on whether the transaction at issue was conducted at arm's length. The Court found that Robert Rabkin's close personal relationship with Kathleen Bartlett, a principal of the debtor, combined with the non-arm's-length nature of his $5,000 purchase of a claim, provided sufficient factual support for the bankruptcy court's finding that Rabkin was a non-statutory insider. The Court emphasized that such fact-intensive inquiries require examining the totality of circumstances surrounding the transaction and the relationship between the parties.

Justice Kennedy filed a concurring opinion, joined by Justices Thomas, Gorsuch, and in part by Justice Sotomayor. While agreeing with the majority's application of clear error review, Kennedy emphasized that insider status should be determined on a case-by-case basis using a multifactor test rather than rigid categorical rules. He cautioned against overly broad interpretations of insider status that could undermine the purposes of the Bankruptcy Code by disqualifying genuinely independent creditors from voting on reorganization plans. The concurring opinion stressed the importance of maintaining flexibility in insider determinations to account for the diverse factual scenarios that arise in bankruptcy proceedings.

The Court's decision resolved a circuit split regarding the appropriate standard of review for non-statutory insider determinations and reinforced the principle that bankruptcy courts' factual findings regarding the relationships and transactions underlying insider status deserve appellate deference. By characterizing insider status as predominantly factual, the ruling strengthened the role of bankruptcy courts in making nuanced determinations about creditor relationships while limiting appellate courts to reviewing whether those findings were supported by the evidence.
