= SAS Institute Inc. v. Iancu =

- Supreme Court of the United States

Argued November 27, 2017 Decided April 24, 2018
- Full case name: SAS Institute Inc. v. Iancu
- Docket no.: 16-969
- Citations: 584 U.S. ___ (more) 138 S. Ct. 1348; 200 L. Ed. 2d 695; 126 U.S.P.Q.2d 1307

Case history
- Prior: SAS Inst., Inc. v. ComplementSoft, LLC, 825 F.3d 1341, 119 U.S.P.Q.2d 1031 (Fed. Cir. 2016); cert. granted, 137 S. Ct. 2160 (2017).

Holding
- The United States Patent and Trademark Office, when conducting an inter partes review, must make judgement on all patent claims contested by the petitioner.

Court membership
- Chief Justice John Roberts Associate Justices Anthony Kennedy · Clarence Thomas; Ruth Bader Ginsburg · Stephen Breyer; Samuel Alito · Sonia Sotomayor; Elena Kagan · Neil Gorsuch

Case opinions
- Majority: Gorsuch, joined by Roberts, Kennedy, Thomas, Alito
- Dissent: Ginsburg, joined by Breyer, Sotomayor, Kagan
- Dissent: Breyer, joined by Ginsburg, Sotomayor; Kagan (except Part III–A)

SAS Institute Inc. v. Iancu, 584 U.S. ___ (2018), was a United States Supreme Court case in which the Court held the United States Patent and Trademark Office, when conducting an inter partes review, must make judgement on all patent claims contested by the petitioner.

The case extended from an inter partes review of a patent granted to ComplementSoft by the SAS Institute. SAS had challenged all sixteen claims in the ComplementSoft patent. The Patent Office determined that SAS's petition has merit to find at least one of the claims to be invalid, sufficient to begin the inter partes review. However, the Patent Office issued a "partial institution" power that only reviewed a subset of the claims, denying review of the rest. The Patent Office's final determination only issued judgments on the subset of claims that were actually instituted. The Patent Office found eight of the nine reviewed claims to be invalid.

SAS asserted that under the statute granting inter partes review, 35 U.S.C. § 318(a), that the Office was required to review all of the claims they had identified in their petition, and took action in the United States Court of Appeals for the Federal Circuit to challenge the Office's ruling. The Federal Circuit ruled against SAS, rejecting SAS's argument. After being denied an en banc review by the Court, SAS petitioned the Supreme Court for a writ of certiorari, which the Court accepted in March 2017. The Court arranged to hear the case alongside Oil States Energy Services, LLC v. Greene's Energy Group, LLC, another case related to inter partes review.

The Court gave its decision on April 24, 2017, in a 5–4 ruling that reversed and remanded the decision of the Federal Circuit Court, stating that an inter partes review must rule on each claim challenged by the petitioners. Justice Neil Gorsuch wrote the majority opinion, joined by Justices John Roberts, Anthony Kennedy, Clarence Thomas, and Samuel Alito. Gorsuch wrote that the language of the inter partes statute as passed by Congress was clear, in that there was no "partial institution" power enjoyed by the Director.

Justice Ruth Bader Ginsburg wrote a dissenting opinion, joined by Justices Stephen Breyer, Sonia Sotomayor, and Elena Kagan. Ginsburg argued that as they have already determined from Cuozzo Speed Technologies, LLC v. Lee that the Director is not mandated to grant an inter partes review, the language of the statute could allow the Director of the Patent Office to refuse a petition that includes challenges to claims that they do not believe likely to be invalid, allowing the petitioner to file an amended petition. Another dissenting opinion was written by Justice Breyer, joined by Justices Ginsburg and Sotomayor, and by Kagan in part. Breyer wrote in his dissent related to the interpretation of the language of the statute, and believed that the majority decision mistook the intent of Congress, and that partial inter partes review is appropriate under the statute.
