= Ortiz v. United States =

- Supreme Court of the United States

Argued January 15, 2018 Decided June 22, 2018
- Full case name: Keanu D.W. Ortiz v. United States
- Docket no.: 16-1423
- Citations: 585 U.S. 427 (more)

Holding
- 1. The Appointments Clause does not impose rules about an officer of the United States serving in dual roles. Rather, the clause is concerned only with the method of appointment of the officer.; 2. Military judge's simultaneous service on an Air Force Court of Criminal Appeals and the Court of Military Commission Review violated neither 10 U. S. C. §973(b)(2)(A) nor the appointments clause of the Constitution.

Court membership
- Chief Justice John Roberts Associate Justices Anthony Kennedy · Clarence Thomas; Ruth Bader Ginsburg · Stephen Breyer; Samuel Alito · Sonia Sotomayor; Elena Kagan · Neil Gorsuch

Case opinions
- Majority: Kagan, joined by Roberts, Kennedy, Thomas, Ginsburg, Breyer, Sotomayor
- Concurrence: Thomas
- Dissent: Alito, joined by Gorsuch

Laws applied
- U.S. Const. art. II, § 2, cl. 2

Ortiz v. United States, 585 U.S. 427 (2018), was a United States Supreme Court case regarding the nature of the United States Court of Appeals for the Armed Forces (USCAAF) in relationship to Article III Courts. The Court determined that it had jurisdiction to rule on appeals from the USCAAF, even though that court was created by Congress via Article I of the United States Constitution and is not an Article III court. The case was centered on the United States Constitution's separation of powers doctrine. The Court declared the Appointments Clause does not impose a prohibition on an officer of the United States from serving in two roles simultaneously. Rather, the clause only concerns itself with the method of appointment.

The case is notable for the court's reliance on the 1803 case of Marbury v. Madison.

== Facts ==
Ortiz was an airman convicted by a military tribunal of distributing child pornography, and sentenced to two years in prison followed by a dishonorable discharge. His sentence was affirmed by the Air Force Court of Criminal Appeals (AFCCA), by a panel which included Colonel Martin Mitchell, who had been appointed to that body by the Secretary of Defense, and by the President of the United States, with the advice and consent of the Senate. Ortiz sought review, asserting that Mitchell's presence on the panel violated statute law and the Appointments Clause of the U.S. Constitution.

== See also ==
- List of United States Supreme Court cases, volume 585
