= Collins v. Virginia =

- Supreme Court of the United States

Argued January 9, 2018 Decided May 29, 2018
- Full case name: Ray Austin Collins v. Virginia
- Docket no.: 16-1027
- Citations: 584 U.S. 586 (more) 138 S. Ct. 1663; 201 L. Ed. 2d 9
- Argument: Oral argument

Case history
- Prior: Collins v. Commonwealth, 292 Va. 486, 790 S.E.2d 611 (2016); cert. granted, 138 S. Ct. 53 (2017).

Holding
- The Fourth Amendment's motor vehicle exception for a warrantless search based on reasonable cause does not apply to vehicles stored within a person's home or its curtilage.

Court membership
- Chief Justice John Roberts Associate Justices Anthony Kennedy · Clarence Thomas; Ruth Bader Ginsburg · Stephen Breyer; Samuel Alito · Sonia Sotomayor; Elena Kagan · Neil Gorsuch

Case opinions
- Majority: Sotomayor, joined by Roberts, Kennedy, Thomas, Ginsburg, Breyer, Kagan, Gorsuch
- Concurrence: Thomas
- Dissent: Alito

Collins v. Virginia, No. 16-1027, 584 U.S. 586 (2018), was a case before the Supreme Court of the United States involving search and seizure. At issue was whether the Fourth Amendment's motor vehicle exception permits a police officer uninvited and without a warrant to enter private property, approach a house, and search a vehicle parked a few feet from the house that is otherwise visible from off the property. In an 8–1 judgment, the Supreme Court ruled that the automobile exception does not apply to vehicles parked within the home or the curtilage of a private homeowner.

== Background ==
In Albemarle County, Virginia, police officer David Rhodes observed from the street what appeared to be a motorcycle with a distinctive appearance under a tarp parked on the property of a home in which the Charlottesville resident Ryan Austin Collins was staying. Rhodes had recognized the colors from a previous high-speed chase two months earlier in which the rider of the motorcycle had eluded him. Officer Rhodes obtained the vehicle's license-plate number using footage from his dashcam video. Rhodes then found photographs of the motorcycle on Collins' Facebook pages that appeared to be taken from where he had seen it parked, which was near the home in an area that was walled on one side by the home and on two sides by a short brick wall. With that as probable cause, Rhodes entered the property in the absence of Collins and, without a warrant, lifted the tarp, took additional photographs, and determined that the bike had been stolen. When Collins returned to the home, Rhodes arrested him on charges of stealing the bike, and the key to the motorcycle was discovered in Collins' possession on arrest. Collins denied owning or having ridden the bike for months.

At trial court, Collins argued that the police had illegally entered the property to search it, as the vehicle was parked with the walled area that he considered the curtilage of the home, a violation under the Fourth Amendment, and sought to void the evidence taken by Rhodes' search.

The state argued that the previous chase and both photographs that Collins had posted on Facebook of himself and the motorcycle were sufficient probable cause. The trial court agreed with the state that Rhodes has probable cause to search under the tarp. The ruling was upheld both in the state's appeal courts and in the Virginia Supreme Court, with the latter affirming that Rhodes' search was proper under the motor vehicle exception to the Fourth Amendment defined by past Supreme Court cases, which allowed for warrantless searches for automobiles with probable cause.

== Supreme Court ==
Collins petitioned the Supreme Court for writ of certiorari on whether the Fourth Amendment protected his rights of privacy for the area a few feet from the boundaries of his home. The Supreme Court agreed in September 2017 to hear the case. The Court heard oral arguments on January 9, 2018.

In oral arguments, the justices discussed the curtilage, the homeowner's expectation of privacy there and the officer's right to enter the property. They discussed the officer's right to lift the tarp, which was potentially a search. They also discussed the difference between an automobile, which is potentially mobile and creates an exigent circumstance for search, with drugs or papers, which are immobile. The discussion devolved into a discussion of the differences between garage, carport, driveway and street. Justice Ginsburg remarked that protection of the garage but not a driveway burdens people who cannot afford a garage.

=== Decision ===
The Court announced judgment in favor of the accused on May 29, 2018, reversing and remanding the case back to lower courts. The Court ruled 8–1 that the automobile exemption does not include the home or curtilage and that vehicles that are stored within the home's curtilage cannot be searched without a warrant. Justice Sonia Sotomayor wrote the majority opinion, which was joined by all but justice Samuel Alito.

Justice Clarence Thomas also wrote a concurring opinion agreeing with the decision but questioning whether the Court had the right to force states to suppress incriminating evidence that was obtained unconstitutionally, as that would be akin to forcing states to follow the federal exclusionary rule.

Alito wrote the sole dissenting opinion, arguing that the question of whether the motorcycle was parked in the curtilage was moot because the motorcycle was within plain view and the officer therefore had reasonable cause to examine the vehicle.

== See also ==
- Fourth Amendment to the United States Constitution
