= 2017 term per curiam opinions of the Supreme Court of the United States =

The Supreme Court of the United States handed down sixteen per curiam opinions during its 2017 term, which began October 2, 2017, and concluded September 30, 2018.

Because per curiam decisions are issued from the Court as an institution, these opinions all lack the attribution of authorship or joining votes to specific justices. All justices on the Court at the time the decision was handed down are assumed to have participated and concurred unless otherwise noted.

== Court membership ==
Chief Justice: John Roberts

Associate Justices: Anthony Kennedy (retired July 31, 2018), Clarence Thomas, Ruth Bader Ginsburg, Stephen Breyer, Samuel Alito, Sonia Sotomayor, Elena Kagan, Neil Gorsuch

== Kernan v. Cuero ==
- Full caption: Scott Kernan, Secretary, California Department of Corrections and Rehabilitation v. Michael Daniel Cuero
- Citations: 583 U.S. ___
- Prior history: Petition denied, sub nom. Cuero v. Cate, No. 08-2008, S.D. Cal., Apr. 25, 2012; rev'd, 827 F. 3d 879 (9th Cir. 2016); rehearing en banc denied, 850 F. 3d 1019 (9th Cir. 2017)
- Laws applied: 28 U.S.C. § 2254(d)(1) (Antiterrorism and Effective Death Penalty Act of 1996)
- Full text of the opinion: official slip opinion · Justia

583 U.S. ___
Decided November 6, 2017.
Ninth Circuit reversed and remanded.

In this case, Cuero pled guilty to a charge for which he could expect approximately 14 years in prison. After his plea, the court allowed the prosecution to amend the charges such that Cuero could expect a minimum of 25 years in prison. The court also allowed Cuero to withdraw his plea. Cuero later pled guilty to the second set of charges. The Ninth Circuit held that "federal law" clearly established that Cuero was entitled to specific performance of the sentence associated with the 14-year charges when he pled guilty the first time.

The Supreme Court reversed the Ninth Circuit and announced that "federal law" as interpreted by the Supreme Court has not clearly established that specific performance is constitutionally required in this circumstance. The Court did not address any other questions.

== Dunn v. Madison ==
- Full caption: Jefferson Dunn, Commissioner, Alabama Department of Corrections v. Vernon Madison
- Citations: 583 U.S. 11
- Prior history: Petition denied, sub nom. Madison v. Commissioner, Ala. Dept. of Corrections; rev'd in part, remanded, 677 F. 3d 1333 (11th Cir. 2012); cert. denied, sub nom. Thomas v. Madison, 568 U.S. 1019 (2012); petition denied, sub nom. Madison v. Commissioner, Ala. Dept. of Corrections; aff'd, 761 F. 3d 1240 (11th Cir. 2014); cert. denied, sub nom. Madison v. Thomas, 135 S. St. 1562 (2015); rehearing denied, 135 S. Ct. 2346 (2015); petition denied, S.D. Ala., May 10, 2016; rev'd, 851 F. 3d 1173 (11th Cir. 2017)
- Laws applied: U.S. Const. amend. VIII; 28 U.S.C. § 2254(d)(1) (Antiterrorism and Effective Death Penalty Act of 1996)
- Full text of the opinion: official slip opinion · Justia

583 U.S. 11
Decided November 6, 2017.
Eleventh Circuit reversed.

Neither Ford v. Wainwright nor Panetti v. Quarterman "clearly established" that a prisoner is incompetent to be executed because of a failure to remember that they committed the crime, as distinct from a failure to rationally comprehend the concepts of crime and punishment as applied in their case.

Ginsburg filed a concurrence, joined by Breyer and Sotomayor. Breyer filed a concurrence.

== In re United States ==
- Full caption: In re United States, et al.
- Citations: 583 U.S. ___
- Prior history: Motion granted, sub. nom. Regents of Univ. of Cal. v. Department of Homeland Security, No. 3:17-cv-05211, 2017 WL 4642324 (N.D. Cal., Oct. 17, 2017); petition denied sub. nom., In re United States, 875 F.3d 1200 (9th Cir. 2017); stay denied, 875 F.3d 1177 (9th Cir. 2017).
- Subsequent history: Remanded, In re United States, 877 F.3d 1080 (9th Cir. 2017); preliminary injunction granted sub. nom., Regents of the Univ. of Cal. v. Dep't of Homeland Security, 279 F. Supp. 3d 1011 (N.D. Cal. 2018); affirmed, 908 F.3d 476 (9th Cir. 2018); cert. granted, 139 S. Ct. 2779 (2019).
- Full text of the opinion: official slip opinion · Justia

583 U.S. ___
Decided December 20, 2017.
Ninth Circuit vacated and remanded.

Vacated an order requiring the federal government to complete the administrative record filed in a proceeding brought to prevent the repeal of the Deferred Action for Childhood Arrivals (DACA) program.

== Tharpe v. Sellers ==
- Full caption: Keith Tharpe v. Eric Sellers, Warden
- Citations: 583 U.S. ___
- Prior history: Motion denied, sub nom. Tharpe v. Warden, No. 10–433 (M.D. Ga., Sept. 5, 2017); certificate denied, 2017 WL 4250413 (11th Cir. Sept. 21, 2017)
- Full text of the opinion: official slip opinion · Oyez

583 U.S. ___
Decided January 8, 2018.
Eleventh Circuit vacated and remanded.

Reversed a denial of a certificate of appealability in a case where the defendant presented evidence that a juror's racial prejudice affected the juror's vote for the death penalty.

Thomas filed a dissent, joined by Alito and Gorsuch.

== CNH Industrial N. V. v. Reese ==
- Full caption: CNH Industrial N.V., et al. v. Jack Reese, et al.
- Citations: 583 U.S. ___
- Prior history: Summary judgment granted, 143 F. Supp. 3d 609 (E.D. Mich. 2015); aff'd in part, 854 F. 3d 877 (6th Cir. 2017)
- Full text of the opinion: official slip opinion · Justia

583 U.S. ___
Decided February 20, 2018.
Sixth Circuit reversed and remanded.

== Kisela v. Hughes ==
- Full caption: Kisela v. Hughes
- Citations: 584 U.S. ___
- Prior history: Summary judgment granted to plaintiff, No. 11-00366, D. Ariz.; rev'd, 862 F. 3d 775 (9th Cir. 2016)
- Laws applied: U.S. Const. amend. IV; 42 U.S.C. § 1983
- Full text of the opinion: official slip opinion · Justia

584 U.S. ___
Decided April 2, 2018.
Ninth Circuit reversed and remanded.

Sotomayor filed a dissent, joined by Ginsburg.

== United States v. Microsoft Corp. ==
- Full caption: United States v. Microsoft Corporation
- Citations: 584 U.S. ___
- Prior history: cert. granted, 583 U.S. ___ (2017)
- Laws applied: 18 U.S.C. § 2703 (Stored Communications Act); Clarifying Lawful Overseas Use of Data Act §103(a)(1)
- Full text of the opinion: official slip opinion · Oyez

584 U.S. ___
Decided April 17, 2018.
In December 2013, federal agents applied to the United States District Court for the Southern District of New York for a warrant under the Stored Communications Act (SCA) that would require Microsoft to turn over all emails and records related to the account of one of its users. A Magistrate Judge issued the warrant “[t]o the extent that the information . . . is within [Microsoft’s] possession, custody, or control.” After receiving the warrant, Microsoft determined that the requested data was being stored in a data center in Dublin, Ireland. Microsoft moved to quash the warrant on the grounds that information stored on servers in one country cannot be obtained based on a warrant from another country's courts. The Magistrate Judge denied their motion to quash, and held Microsoft in contempt due to their failure to turn over the information requested by the government. Microsoft appealed, and the Second Circuit sided with Microsoft, holding that requiring a company to turn over data held in a server in another country would be prohibited under the SCA. The government appealed to the Supreme Court, which granted certiorari on October 17, 2017 to determine whether an American company has to turn over data requested in a warrant when that data is stored overseas. Oral arguments in the case were held on February 27, 2018.

On February 6, 2018, Congressman Doug Collins introduced the Clarifying Lawful Overseas Use of Data (CLOUD) Act, which allows American law enforcement to compel the production of data stored abroad through warrants issued by American courts. The CLOUD Act was signed into law by President Donald Trump on March 23, 2018. On April 27, 2018, the Supreme Court issued a per curiam opinion noting that the passage and enactment of the CLOUD Act mooted the proceedings in the case, and remanding the case back to the lower courts to proceed under the new law.

== Azar v. Garza ==
- Full caption: Alex M. Azar, II, Secretary of Health and Human Services, et al. v. Rochelle Garza, as guardian at litem to unaccompanied minor J. D.
- Citations: 584 U.S. ___
- Prior history: temporary restraining order granted, sub nom. Garza v. Hargan, No. 17–2122 (D. D.C., Oct. 18, 2017); vacated in part, D.C. Cir., Oct. 19, 2017; vacated and remanded, 874 F. 3d 735 (D.C. Cir. 2017)
- Full text of the opinion: official slip opinion · Oyez

584 U.S. ___
Decided June 4, 2018.
District of Columbia Circuit vacated and remanded.

== Benisek v. Lamone ==
- Full caption: O. John Benisek, et al. v. Linda H. Lamone, Administrator, Maryland State Board of Elections, et al.
- Citations: 585 U.S. ___
- Prior history: Preliminary injunction denied, 266 F. Supp. 3d 799 (D. Md. 2017)
- Full text of the opinion: official slip opinion · Oyez

585 U.S. ___
Decided June 18, 2018.
District Court for the District of Maryland affirmed.

== Sause v. Bauer ==
- Full caption: Mary Anne Sause v. Timothy J. Bauer, et al.
- Citations: 585 U.S. 957
- Prior history: Dismissed, No. 15-09633, 2016 WL 3387469 (D. Kan. June 20, 2016; aff'd, 59 F. 3d 1270 (10th Cir. 2017)
- Laws applied: U. S. Const. amends. I, IV
- Full text of the opinion: official slip opinion · Oyez

585 U.S. 957
Decided June 28, 2018.
Tenth Circuit reversed and remanded.

Neither the free exercise issue nor the officer's entitlement to qualified immunity can be resolved against Sause, a pro se complainant, consistent with the requirement to liberally construe allegations in a pro se complaint.

== Sexton v. Beaudreaux ==
- Full caption: Michael Sexton, Warden v. Nicholas Beaudreaux
- Citations: 585 U.S. 961
- Prior history: Petition denied, sub nom. Beaudreaux v. Soto, No. 13-00351 (N.D. Ca. Feb. 5, 2015); rev'd, No. 15-15345, (9th Cir. Sept. 18, 2017); rehearing denied, 9th Cir., Nov. 8, 2017
- Laws applied: U. S. Const. amends. VI, XIV
- Full text of the opinion: official slip opinion · Oyez

585 U.S. 961
Decided June 28, 2018.
Ninth Circuit reversed and remanded.

Supreme Court precedents from cases applying 28 U. S. C. § 2254(d), such as Harrington v. Richter, require that, when there is no reasoned state-court decision on the merits, the federal court must determine what arguments or theories... could have supported the state court's decision; and then it must ask whether it is possible fair-minded jurists could disagree that those arguments or theories are inconsistent with the holding in a prior decision of this Court. If such disagreement is possible, then the petitioner's claim must be denied.

Breyer dissented without separate opinion.

== North Carolina v. Covington ==
- Full caption: North Carolina, et al. v. Sandra Little Covington, et al.
- Citations: 585 U.S. 969
- Prior history: Judgment granted to plaintiffs, 316 F. R. D. 117 (M.D.N.C. 2016); stay granted, 580 U.S. ___ (2017); summarily aff ’d, 581 U.S. ___ (2017); remedial order vacated and remanded, 581 U. S. ___ (2017) (per curiam); recommendations of Special Master adopted, 283 F. Supp. 3d 410 (M.D.N.C. 2018); stay granted in part, 583 U.S. ___ (2018)
- Full text of the opinion: official slip opinion · Oyez

585 U.S. 969
Decided June 28, 2018.
District Court for the Middle District of North Carolina affirmed in part and reversed in part.

The District Court's remedial authority was limited to ensuring that the plaintiffs were relieved of the burden of voting in racially gerrymandered legislative districts. Once the court ensured that the racial gerrymanders at issue were remedied, its proper role in the legislative districting process was at an end.

Thomas filed a dissent.

== See also ==
- List of United States Supreme Court cases, volume 583
- List of United States Supreme Court cases, volume 584
- List of United States Supreme Court cases, volume 585
