= Immigration and Nationality Act =

The United States Immigration and Nationality Act may refer to:

- Immigration and Nationality Act of 1952
- Immigration and Nationality Act of 1965
- Immigration Act of 1990

== See also ==
- List of United States immigration legislation
- Border Security, Economic Opportunity, and Immigration Modernization Act of 2013
