= Stephanos Bibas =

American federal judge (born 1969)

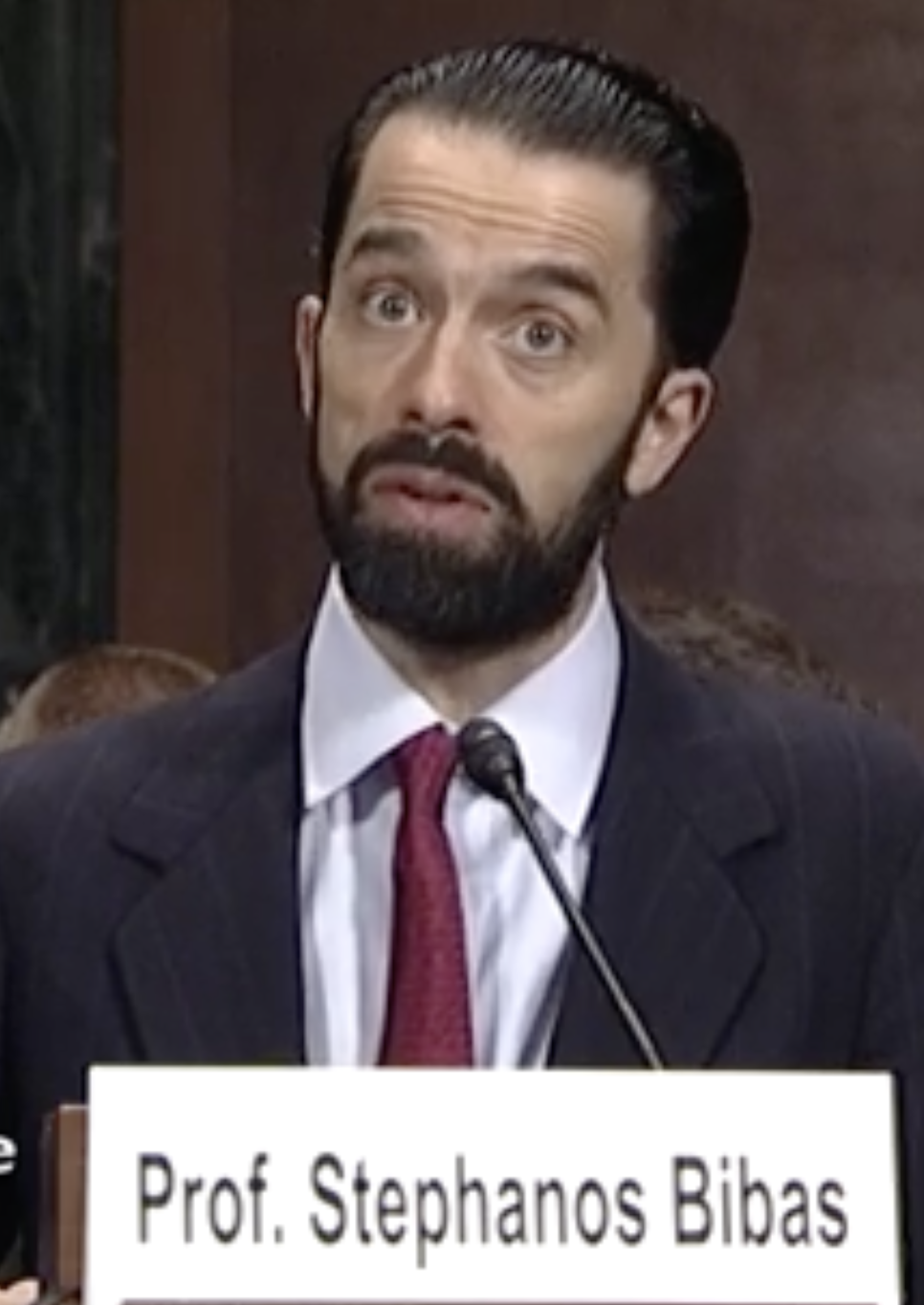

Judge of the United States Court of Appeals for the Third Circuit
- Incumbent
- Assumed office November 20, 2017
- Appointed by: Donald Trump
- Preceded by: Marjorie Rendell

Personal details
- Born: June 18, 1969 (age 57) New York City, New York, U.S.
- Party: Republican
- Education: Columbia University (BA); University College, Oxford (MA); Yale University (JD)

Stephanos Bibas (born June 18, 1969) is an American lawyer and jurist serving as a United States circuit judge of the United States Court of Appeals for the Third Circuit. He was appointed to the bench in 2017 by President Donald Trump. Before his appointment, he was a professor of law and criminology at the University of Pennsylvania Law School, where he was the director of its Supreme Court clinic.

Bibas is a noted scholar of criminal procedure with expertise in criminal charging, plea bargaining, and sentencing. As a professor, he examined how procedural rules written for jury trials have unintended consequences when cases involving jury trials are the exception, rather than the rule, with 95 percent of defendants pleading guilty. Bibas also studied the role of substantive goals such as remorse and apology in criminal procedure.

== Early life and education ==
Bibas was born on June 18, 1969, in New York City. He spent his summers growing up working in his family's restaurants for his father, a Greek immigrant who had survived the Axis occupation of Greece during World War II. In high school, Bibas became involved in debate and public speaking. He graduated high school at the age of 15 and entered Columbia University.

At Columbia, Bibas was a member of the Philolexian Society and participated in Parliamentary debate. He graduated from Columbia in 1989 at age 19 with a Bachelor of Arts, summa cum laude, in political theory. He then studied jurisprudence at University College, Oxford, receiving a Bachelor of Arts in 1991 (later promoted per tradition to a Master of Arts). While at Oxford, he won the 1st place speaker award in the World Debate Championships. Bibas then attended Yale Law School, where he was a symposium editor of the Yale Law Journal and a member of the moot court team, winning awards for best oralist and best team. He graduated in 1994 with a Juris Doctor.

== Professional career ==
From 1994 to 1995, Bibas was a law clerk for judge Patrick Higginbotham of the United States Court of Appeals for the Fifth Circuit. He spent two years in private practice as an associate at the law firm Covington & Burling, then was a law clerk to justice Anthony Kennedy of the United States Supreme Court from 1997 to 1998, where he was a co-clerk of future federal judge Raymond Kethledge.

After his Supreme Court clerkship, Bibas worked from 1998 to 2000 as an Assistant United States Attorney for the Southern District of New York. He successfully prosecuted Alastair Duncan, the world's leading expert in Tiffany stained glass, for hiring a grave robber to steal Tiffany windows from cemeteries. Duncan was sentenced to 27 months in Federal prison.

Bibas was a research fellow at Yale Law from 2000 to 2001, then became a professor at the University of Iowa College of Law. In 2006, Bibas moved to the University of Pennsylvania Law School. He received the Robert A. Gorman Award for Excellence in Teaching in 2008.

Bibas is the 15th-most-cited law professor by the United States Supreme Court, United States Courts of Appeals, and state high courts as well as the 5th-most-cited professor of criminal law and procedure by law professors.

== Supreme Court clinic ==
Bibas also directed Penn Law's Supreme Court clinic, for which he litigated a wide range of appellate cases under consideration by the United States Supreme Court. The clinic allows students to assist on real Supreme Court cases, including recruiting, strategizing, researching, writing briefs, participating in moot court rehearsals, and attending oral arguments at the Court itself. The Court appointed him to brief and argue Tapia v. United States as amicus curiae. The Court praised Bibas and the clinic for doing "an exceptionally good job" on that case.

Cases argued

- Turner v. Rogers (2011)
- Tapia v. United States (2011)
- Vartelas v. Holder (2012)
- Petrella v. MGM, Inc. (2014)
- Bank of America v. Caulkett (2015)
- Encino Motorcars v. Navarro (2016)

== Federal judicial service ==
On June 19, 2017, President Donald Trump nominated Bibas to serve as a United States circuit judge of the United States Court of Appeals for the Third Circuit, to fill the seat vacated by Judge Midge Rendell, who assumed senior status on July 1, 2015. The American Bar Association rated him a unanimously “Well Qualified” nominee, its highest ranking. On October 4, 2017, a hearing on his nomination was held before the Senate Judiciary Committee. On October 26, 2017, his nomination was reported out of committee by an 11–9 vote. On November 2, 2017, the United States Senate invoked cloture on his nomination by a 54–43 vote. His nomination was confirmed on the same day by a 53–43 vote. He received his judicial commission on November 20, 2017. Judge Bibas also has sat by designation as a trial judge in the United States District Court for the District of Delaware, the District of New Jersey, and the Eastern District of Pennsylvania.

According to a legal writing expert, “Judge Bibas is considered one of the best writers on the federal bench.” Bibas’s judicial writing style has been called “instantly recognizable”; its use of short, punchy sentences and colorful examples aims for "radical clarity." His writing style and typography have been praised as “point[ing] the way to opinions that are more professional-looking and readable.” In a widely quoted speech, he argued that judges should write “in a way that ordinary citizens can understand.” Doing so helps the public see that “judges aren’t just politicians in robes.”

As covered in the Wall Street Journal, Bibas has stated: "My boss is not my chief judge. My boss is not my appointing president. My boss is the Constitution and the laws."

=== Notable Circuit Court opinions ===
Bibas has authored over one hundred opinions for the Third Circuit on a wide range of subjects, including the following notable opinions:

- Jacobs v. Federal Housing Finance Agency, 908 F.3d 884 (3d Cir. 2018). Writing for the court, Judge Bibas upheld, on statutory grounds, the creation of the Federal Housing Finance Agency (FHFA), a government conservator that took over Fannie Mae and Freddie Mac and helped rescue the nation's economy after the housing crisis of 2008, as well as the FHFA's ability to retain Fannie and Freddie's future net profits in exchange for taking on their crisis-era liabilities.
- Association of New Jersey Rifle & Pistol Clubs v. Attorney General of New Jersey, 910 F.3d 106 (3d Cir. 2018) (Bibas, J., dissenting). Judge Bibas dissented from a majority opinion that upheld New Jersey's ban on large capacity magazines for firearms. Bibas criticized the majority for failing to respect the right to bear arms guaranteed by the Second Amendment, writing that it is "an equal part" of the United States Bill of Rights, which, like other enumerated constitutional rights, requires heightened judicial scrutiny.
- Donald J. Trump for President, Inc. v. Secretary Commonwealth of Pennsylvania, 830 F. App’x 377 (3d Cir. 2020). On November 27, 2020, Bibas authored the opinion in the case that rejected the 2020 Donald Trump presidential campaign's attempt to undo the certification of votes in the 2020 United States presidential election in Pennsylvania. Bibas opened his opinion by writing: "Free, fair elections are the lifeblood of our democracy. Charges of unfairness are serious. But calling an election unfair does not make it so. Charges require specific allegations and then proof. We have neither here." Bibas concluded by stressing that "[v]oters, not lawyers, choose the President" and "[b]allots, not briefs, decide elections."
- E.O.H.C. v. Secretary U.S. Department of Homeland Security, 950 F.3d 177 (3d Cir. 2020). Writing for the court, Judge Bibas held that district courts have jurisdiction to hear a wide array of "now or never" challenges to the conditions of an immigrant detainee's confinement. Among them were the plaintiffs' challenges to (1) the Trump Administration's Migrant Protection Protocols (MPP) and (2) alleged violations of the Flores Settlement Agreement.
- McCafferty v. Newsweek Media Group, 955 F.3d 352 (3d Cir. 2020). Judge Bibas delivered the opinion of the Court, affirming, on First Amendment grounds, the dismissal of a Defamation complaint against Newsweek brought by a twelve-year-old, politically vocal supporter of Donald Trump. Bibas wrote: "Political discourse can be bruising. People often express opinions that offend others. But the First Amendment protects virtually all of those opinions, even offensive and hurtful ones, to promote a greater good: robust political discourse. The price of free speech is putting up with all sorts of name-calling and hurtful rhetoric."
- Folajtar v. Attorney General of the United States, 980 F.3d 897 (3d Cir. 2020) (Bibas, J., dissenting). Judge Bibas dissented from a majority opinion that held that the government could, consistent with the Second Amendment, permanently ban gun possession by all felons, regardless of whether their crimes were violent or dangerous. Bibas canvassed the original history of the Second Amendment and historical laws that had limited the right to bear arms, ultimately concluding that a citizen’s dangerousness, not her virtuousness, is what separates those who can and cannot be denied the right to bear arms. Bibas would have thus held that the plaintiff, who had committed a non-violent felony many years prior, should not be denied her Second Amendment rights forever because “[f]elons are more than the wrongs they have done.”
- United States of America v. Safehouse, 985 F.3d 225 (3d Cir. 2021). Writing for the court, Judge Bibas held that a nonprofit “safe-injection site” would violate federal law. He reasoned that Congress had made it a crime to open a property to others for drug use. Though Congress may not have intended the law to cover safe-injection sites, that was “irrelevant”: “A court’s job is to parse texts, not psychoanalyze lawmakers.” The court also held that under Supreme Court precedent, the law at issue was a valid exercise of Congress’s commerce power.
- Nekrilov v. City of Jersey City, 45 F.4th 662 (3d Cir. 2022). Judge Bibas concurred in a challenge to Jersey City, New Jersey restrictions on residents’ renting their homes through platforms like Airbnb. He proposed an originalist test for deciding when a regulation violates the Constitution’s Takings Clause - the last clause of the Fifth Amendment to the United States Constitution. He wrote that the government should “have to compensate [a property] owner whenever it takes a property right and presses it into public use—even if the taking did not involve a physical invasion.” Under that test, a regulation counts as a taking if it “take[s] a property right from the ‘collection of individual rights’ that ‘constitute property’” under state law.
- Wharton v. Superintendent Graterford SCI, 95 F.4th 140 (3d Cir. 2024). Judge Bibas, writing for the Court, affirmed sanctions against Philadelphia District Attorney Larry Krasner. Krasner's office had conceded that Wharton was entitled to habeas relief, and it represented that this concession followed careful review of the record and "communications with the victims' family." But the district court found that Krasner had failed to disclose unfavorable facts and that his communication with the victims' family was minimal. Judge Bibas concluded that "the District Court properly ordered [Krasner] to apologize to the murder victims' family and be more forthcoming in the future."
- Delaware State Sportsman Association, Inc. v. Delaware Department of Safety & Homeland Security, 108 F.4th 194 (3d Cir. 2024). The Delaware State Sportsman Association was denied a preliminary injunction against the State's ban on assault weapons and appealed. The Association argued that it was entitled to an injunction as long as the ban violated the Second Amendment, even if it did not otherwise explain how it would be harmed by the ban. Writing for the Court, Judge Bibas disagreed. Tracing the history of preliminary injunctions, he concluded that courts must consider not simply the merits but "the equities, the public interest, and irreparable harm too." He acknowledged that courts presume harm in First Amendment cases, but declined to extend that presumption to the Second Amendment because doing so would "trample on traditional principles of equity."

=== District court opinions ===
Judge Bibas sits by designation routinely in the District of Delaware and occasionally in the Eastern District of Pennsylvania and District of New Jersey. Some of his notable opinions are:

- Gibbs v. Carney, 2022 WL 3681327 (D. Del. 2022). Delaware prisoners alleged that their prison violated the Eighth Amendment during the COVID-19 pandemic by denying them masks and punishing them for wearing makeshift ones. Judge Bibas dismissed some of their claims but allowed the suit to go forward against the prison warden. The prisoners had plausibly alleged that the warden had “unreasonably failed to intervene to enforce the [prison’s mask] mandate.”
- Consumer Financial Protection Bureau v. National Collegiate Master Student Loan Trust, 575 F. Supp. 3d 505 (D. Del. 2021). The Consumer Financial Protection Bureau sued some student trusts for “engaging in forbidden debt-collection and litigation practices.” Over the trusts’ objections, Judge Bibas allowed the suit to go forward. The trusts had argued that the suit was improper because the CFPB filed it when its director had been unconstitutionally insulated from presidential removal. But Judge Bibas rejected that argument: “[S]o long as the agency head was properly appointed,” his actions were not automatically void. Instead, the trusts would need to “show that the removal provision harmed [them].” Here, the trusts could not show that.
- Ninivaggi v. University of Delaware, 555 F. Supp. 3d 44 (D. Del. 2021). Judge Bibas heard a case brought by University of Delaware students whose classes went online because of the COVID-19 pandemic. They sued the school for a tuition refund, claiming that it had not given them the in-person education that it had promised. Judge Bibas ruled that the students had stated a plausible contract claim, so he let the case go forward. He explained that although the school had not expressly promised in-person classes, it may have impliedly promised that.
- Avenatti v. Fox News Network, LLC, 2021 WL 3603035 (D. Del. 2021). Judge Bibas dismissed a libel lawsuit brought by celebrity lawyer Michael Avenatti. Avenatti alleged that Fox News and its correspondents had defamed him by reporting on his arrest for domestic violence. But because Avenatti is a public figure, Judge Bibas reasoned, Avenatti had to show Actual malice —that the defendants “knew that the statements were false or recklessly disregarded that possibility.” Since none of the statements Avenatti identified met that standard (and some were not even false), the case had to be dismissed.

=== Clerks ===
Judge Bibas is one of the top judges for “feeding” his clerks to the Supreme Court of the United States. His law clerks have been hired to clerk for seven different Justices: Chief Justice John Roberts, Justices Clarence Thomas, Samuel Alito, Elena Kagan, Neil Gorsuch, Amy Coney Barrett and retired Justice Stephen Breyer. Another of his clerks served as a Bristow Fellow in the Office of the Solicitor General of the United States.

== Personal life ==
Bibas has made some donations to Republicans. He was a member of the Federalist Society from 1991 to 2017. He has also served as a deacon of the Russian Orthodox Church in Eastern America since 2015.

== Selected scholarly works ==
=== Books ===
- Bibas, Stephanos (2012). The Machinery of Criminal Justice. Oxford, New York: Oxford University Press. ISBN 9780195374681.
- —; Barton, Benjamin H. (2017). Rebooting Justice: More Technology, Fewer Lawyers, and the Future of Law. New York: Encounter Books. ISBN 978-1594039331.

=== Articles ===
- Bibas, Stephanos (2001). "Judicial Factfinding and Sentence Enhancements in a World of Guilty Pleas". Yale Law Journal. 110 (7): 1097–1185. JSTOR 797526. Archived from the original on October 8, 2014.
- — (2003). "Harmonizing Substantive-Criminal-Law Values and Criminal Procedure: The Case of Alford and Nolo Contendere Pleas". Cornell Law Review. 88 (5): 1361–1411. Archived from the original on October 7, 2014.
- — (2004). "Plea Bargaining Outside the Shadow of Trial". Harvard Law Review. 117 (8): 2464–2547. JSTOR 4093404. Archived from the original on October 8, 2014.
- —; Bierschbach, Richard A. (2004). "Incorporating Remorse and Apology into Criminal Procedure" (PDF). Yale Law Journal. 114 (1): 85–148. JSTOR 4135717.
- — (2005). "Regulating Local Variations in Federal Sentencing". Stanford Law Review. 58 (1): 137–54. JSTOR 40040255. Archived from the original on October 8, 2014.
- — (2006). "Transparency and Participation in Criminal Procedure". New York University Law Review. 81 (3): 911–66. Archived from the original on June 22, 2024.
- — (2009). "Prosecutorial Regulation Versus Prosecutorial Accountability". University of Pennsylvania Law Review. 157 (4): 959–1016. Archived from the original on October 7, 2014.
- — (2011). "Regulating the Plea-Bargaining Market: From Caveat Emptor to Consumer Protection". California Law Review. 99 (4): 1117–62. JSTOR 23018620. Archived from the original on October 7, 2014.
- — (2012). "Incompetent Plea Bargaining and Extrajudicial Reforms". Harvard Law Review. 126 (1): 150–74. JSTOR 23415894.
- —; Bierschbach, Richard A. (2016). "What's Wrong with Sentencing Equality?". Virginia Law Review. 102 (6): 1447–1522. JSTOR 43923342.

== See also ==
- List of law clerks for the first seat of the Supreme Court of the United States

== Videos ==
- Appearances on C-SPAN
- Penn Law Celebrates Stephanos Bibas' Confirmation to the Third Circuit (5:48 min). YouTube.com

Legal offices
Preceded by Midge Rendell	Judge of the United States Court of Appeals for the Third Circuit; 2017–present	Incumbent
