= Supreme Court (disambiguation) =

A supreme court is the highest court of a country or other jurisdiction.

Supreme Court may also refer to:

- A supreme court building housing a given supreme court
- Supreme Court (horse) (1948–1962), a British Thoroughbred racehorse and sire
- Supreme Court metro station, Delhi, India

== See also ==
- Supreme Court clinic
