= Hughes v. United States =

- Supreme Court of the United States

Decided June 4, 2018
- Full case name: Hughes v. United States
- Docket no.: 17-155
- Citations: 584 U.S. 675 (more)

Holding
- A sentence imposed pursuant to a plea agreement under Federal Rule of Criminal Procedure 11(c)(1)(C) is "based on" the defendant's Guidelines range so long as that range was part of the framework the district court relied on in imposing the sentence or accepting the agreement.

Court membership
- Chief Justice John Roberts Associate Justices Anthony Kennedy · Clarence Thomas; Ruth Bader Ginsburg · Stephen Breyer; Samuel Alito · Sonia Sotomayor; Elena Kagan · Neil Gorsuch

Case opinions
- Majority: Kennedy
- Dissent: Roberts, joined by Thomas, Alito

Hughes v. United States, 584 U.S. 675 (2018), was a United States Supreme Court case in which the court held that a sentence imposed pursuant to a plea agreement under Federal Rule of Criminal Procedure 11(c)(1)(C) is "based on" the defendant's Guidelines range so long as that range was part of the framework the district court relied on in imposing the sentence or accepting the agreement.

== Background ==
In Freeman v. United States, the Supreme Court considered whether an incarcerated person who had been sentenced under a plea agreement authorized by the Federal Rules of Criminal Procedure could have his sentence reduced under 18 U. S. C. §3582(c)(2) when his Federal Guidelines sentencing range was lowered retroactively. No single interpretation or rationale commanded a majority, however. Some Courts of Appeals, turning to Marks v. United States for guidance, adopted the reasoning of Justice Sonia Sotomayor's opinion concurring in the judgment. Others interpreted Marks differently and adopted the plurality's reasoning. Hughes v. United States provided an opportunity for the Supreme Court to resolve the substantive sentencing issue discussed in Freeman without addressing which interpretation of Marks was correct.

The Sentencing Reform Act of 1984 authorizes the United States Sentencing Commission to establish, and retroactively amend, Sentencing Guidelines. Though the Guidelines are only advisory, a district court must consult them during sentencing, along with other factors specified in 18 U. S. C. §3553(a), including "the need to avoid unwarranted sentence disparities." When an amendment applies retroactively, district courts may reduce the sentences of incarcerated people whose sentences were "based on a sentencing range that has subsequently been lowered by the Sentencing Commission" using §3582(c)(2).

Hughes concerned whether a defendant may seek relief under §3582(c)(2) if he entered a plea agreement under Federal Rule of Criminal Procedure 11(c)(1)(C) (Type-C agreement), which permits the defendant and the government to "agree that a specific sentence or sentencing range is the appropriate disposition of the case," and "binds the court [to the agreed-upon sentence] once [it] accepts the plea agreement." In making its decision, the district court must consider the Sentencing Guidelines. The court may not accept the agreement unless the sentence is either within the applicable Guidelines range or it is outside that range for explicit, justifiable reasons.

After Erik Hughes was indicted on drug and gun charges, he and the government negotiated a Type-C plea agreement, which stipulated that Hughes would receive a sentence of 180 months but did not refer to a particular Guidelines range. Hughes pleaded guilty. At his sentencing hearing, the district court accepted the agreement and sentenced him to 180 months. In so doing, it calculated Hughes' Guidelines range as 188 to 235 months and determined that the sentence was in accordance with the Guidelines and other factors the court was required to consider. Less than two months later, the Sentencing Commission adopted, and made retroactive, an amendment that had the effect of reducing Hughes' sentencing range to 151 to 188 months. The district court denied Hughes' motion for a reduced sentence under §3582(c)(2), and the Eleventh Circuit Court of Appeals affirmed. Both courts concluded that, under the Freeman concurrence, Hughes was ineligible for a reduced sentence because his plea agreement did not expressly rely on a Guidelines range.

== Opinion of the court ==
The Supreme Court issued an opinion on June 4, 2018.
