= List of United States Supreme Court cases, volume 564 =

This is a list of all the United States Supreme Court cases from volume 564 of the United States Reports:

Case name	Citation	Date decided
Sykes v. United States	564 U.S. 1	June 9, 2011
Felony vehicle flight, as proscribed by Indiana law, is a violent felony for purposes of the Armed Career Criminal Act.
Talk Am., Inc. v. Mich. Bell Tel. Co.	564 U.S. 50	June 9, 2011
The Federal Communications Commission had advanced a reasonable interpretation of its regulations in a dispute with AT&T.
DePierre v. United States	564 U.S. 70	June 9, 2011
The term "cocaine base" in 21 U.S.C. § 841(b)(1) refers to cocaine in its chemically basic form.
Microsoft Corp. v. i4i Ltd. Partnership	564 U.S. 91	June 9, 2011
35 U.S.C. § 282 requires a patent-invalidity defense to be proved by clear and convincing evidence.
Nev. Comm'n on Ethics v. Carrigan	564 U.S. 117	June 13, 2011
The Nevada Ethics in Government Law is not unconstitutionally overbroad.
Janus Capital Group, Inc. v. First Derivative Traders	564 U.S. 135	June 13, 2011
A service provider cannot be held liable in a private action under SEC Rule 10b-5.
United States v. Jicarilla Apache Nation	564 U.S. 162	June 13, 2011
The fiduciary exception to attorney–client privilege does not apply to the general trust relationship between the United States and Indian tribes.
Flores-Villar v. United States	564 U.S. 210	June 13, 2011
Lower court upheld by an equally divided court.
Bond v. United States	564 U.S. 211	June 16, 2011
People, just like states, may have standing to raise Tenth Amendment challenges to a federal law.
Davis v. United States	564 U.S. 229	June 16, 2011
Searches conducted in objectively reasonable reliance on binding appellate precedent are not subject to the exclusionary rule.
J.D.B. v. North Carolina	564 U.S. 261	June 16, 2011
A child’s age properly informs the Miranda custody analysis.
Smith v. Bayer Corp.	564 U.S. 299	June 16, 2011
Federal courts cannot issue orders to prevent state courts from issuing class certifications.
Tapia v. United States	564 U.S. 319	June 16, 2011
The Sentencing Reform Act precludes a federal court from imposing or lengthening a prison sentence for the purposes of rehabilitation.
Wal-Mart Stores, Inc. v. Dukes	564 U.S. 338	June 20, 2011
Plaintiffs failed to show that their proposed class shares a common question of law or fact required under Rule 23(a). In addition, claims for monetary relief are not eligible for class certification under Rule 23(b)(2).
Borough of Duryea v. Guarnieri	564 U.S. 379	June 20, 2011
A petition must address a matter of public concern. Otherwise, a public employer is free to retaliate against the public employee, even if the employee won the grievance he filed and brought suit in federal court.
Am. Elec. Power Co. v. Connecticut	564 U.S. 410	June 20, 2011
1. The Second Circuit’s exercise of jurisdiction is affirmed by an equally divided Court. 2. The Clean Air Act and the EPA action the Act authorizes displace any federal common-law right to seek abatement of carbon-dioxide emissions from fossil-fuel fired power plants.
Turner v. Rogers	564 U.S. 431	June 20, 2011
The Due Process Clause of the 14th Amendment, while it does not require a state to provide counsel at civil contempt proceedings to indigent individuals, even if incarceration is a possibility, does require some safeguards to prevent the erroneous deprivation of liberty. South Carolina Supreme Court reversed and remanded.
Stern v. Marshall	564 U.S. 462	June 23, 2011
The U.S. Bankruptcy Court lacked the constitutional authority to enter a final judgment on a state law counterclaim that is not resolved in the process of ruling on a creditor’s proof of claim, even though they are granted statutory authority under 28 U.S.C. §157 (b)2(C).
Freeman v. United States	564 U.S. 522	June 23, 2011
When a criminal defendant pleads guilty under a plea deal and the judge imposes the recommended sentence under the Sentencing Guidelines, the defendant is eligible to have their sentence reduced if the Guidelines later change.
Sorrell v. IMS Health Inc.	564 U.S. 552	June 23, 2011
A Vermont statute that restricted the sale, disclosure, and use of records that revealed the prescribing practices of individual doctors violated the First Amendment.
PLIVA, Inc. v. Mensing	564 U.S. 604	June 23, 2011
Federal regulations govern what gets put on drug labels for generic drugs, so generic drug manufacturers cannot be sued for damages under state laws that punish a failure to warn.
Bullcoming v. New Mexico	564 U.S. 647	June 23, 2011
A second surrogate analyst's testimony about the statements in the forensic report of a separate certifying analyst violates the Confrontation Clause.
CSX Transp., Inc. v. McBride	564 U.S. 685	June 23, 2011
The Federal Employers Liability Act makes a railroad liable if the railroad's negligence plays any part in bringing about the injury; it does not follow proximate-cause standards developed by courts outside of statutory contexts.
Ariz. Free Enterprise Club's Freedom Club PAC v. Bennett	564 U.S. 721	June 27, 2011
Arizona's matching funds scheme substantially burdens political speech and is not sufficiently justified by a compelling interest to survive First Amendment scrutiny.
Brown v. Entertainment Merchants Ass'n	564 U.S. 786	June 27, 2011
Bans on the sale of violent video games to children without parental supervision violate the Free Speech Clause of the First Amendment.
J. McIntyre Machinery, Ltd. v. Nicastro	564 U.S. 873	June 27, 2011
A court may not exercise jurisdiction over a defendant that has not purposefully availed itself of doing business in the jurisdiction or placed goods in the stream of commerce in the expectation they would be purchased in the jurisdiction.
Goodyear Dunlop Tires Operations, S.A. v. Brown	564 U.S. 915	June 27, 2011
The connection between Goodyear and its subsidiaries with the state of North Carolina was not strong enough to establish jurisdiction over the companies.
United States v. Juvenile Male	564 U.S. 932	June 27, 2011
Dismissed the case as moot.
Leal Garcia v. Texas	564 U.S. 940	July 7, 2011
Courts cannot stay an execution on the basis of the then possibility that Congress will, in the future, enact a statute to enforce an international law.
