= Freeman v. United States =

- Supreme Court of the United States

Argued February 23, 2011 Decided June 23, 2011
- Full case name: William Freeman, Petitioner v. United States
- Docket nos.: 09-10245; 09-10246
- Citations: 564 U.S. 522 (more)

Case history
- Prior: Sentence imposed. United States v. Freeman, No. 04-cr-98 (W.D. Ky. 2005).; Motion to reduce sentence denied. No. 04-cr-98 (W.D. Ky. 2008).; Affirmed. 355 Fed. Appx. 1 (6th Cir. 2009).; Reh'g en banc denied. No. 09-5047 (6th Cir. 2010).; Cert granted. 561 U.S. 1058 (2010).

Questions presented
- Whether a defendant is ineligible for a sentence reduction under 18 USC. § 3582(c)(2) solely because the district court accepted a Rule 11(C) plea agreement.

Holding
- The judgment is reversed, and the case is remanded.

Court membership
- Chief Justice John Roberts Associate Justices Antonin Scalia · Anthony Kennedy; Clarence Thomas · Ruth Bader Ginsburg; Stephen Breyer · Samuel Alito; Sonia Sotomayor · Elena Kagan

Case opinions
- Plurality: Kennedy, joined by Ginsburg, Breyer, Kagan
- Concurrence: Sotomayor (in judgment)
- Dissent: Roberts, joined by Scalia, Thomas, Alito

Laws applied
- Federal Rule of Criminal Procedure 11; 18 U.S.C. § 3582(c)(2)
- Superseded by
- Hughes v. United States

Freeman v. United States, 564 U.S. 522 (2011), was a United States Supreme Court case in which a plurality of the court held that when a criminal defendant pleads guilty under a plea deal and the judge imposes the recommended sentence under the Sentencing Guidelines, the defendant is eligible to have their sentence reduced if the Guidelines later change.

== Legal background ==
The Federal Rules of Criminal Procedure are the procedural rules that govern how federal criminal prosecutions are conducted in United States district courts and the general trial courts of the U.S. government. Rule 11 governs pleas in federal criminal cases. Subsection (c) of Rule 11 covers the procedures surrounding plea agreements. It provides:

(c) Plea Agreement Procedure.

(1) In General. An attorney for the government and the defendant's attorney, or the defendant when proceeding pro se, may discuss and reach a plea agreement ... If the defendant pleads guilty or nolo contendere to either a charged offense or a lesser or related offense, the plea agreement may specify that an attorney for the government will:

...
(C) agree that a specific sentence or sentencing range is the appropriate disposition of the case, or that a particular provision of the Sentencing Guidelines, or policy statement, or sentencing factor does or does not apply[.]

Generally, federal courts may not modify a defendant's term of imprisonment once such term has been imposed. However, narrow exceptions exist. A separate federal statute, 18 U.S.C. § 3582, provides that:

18 U.S. Code § 3582 - Imposition of a sentence of imprisonment

...
(c) Modification of an Imposed Term of Imprisonment.—The court may not modify a term of imprisonment once it has been imposed except that—

...
(2) in the case of a defendant who has been sentenced to a term of imprisonment based on a sentencing range that has subsequently been lowered by the Sentencing Commission ... the court may reduce the term of imprisonment[.] [emphasis added]

== Lower court history ==
In January 2005, William Freeman was indicted in the United States District Court for the Western District of Kentucky for various crimes. The operative superseding indictment charged Freeman with possession of crack cocaine, possession of marijuana, and two counts of weapon possession. Freeman entered into a guilty plea pursuant to Rule 11(c)(1)(C). In exchange for pleading guilty to each count of the superseding indictment, the government would recommend a term of imprisonment of 106 months (8 years, 10 months). The plea agreement specified that Freeman's Sentencing Guidelines offense level (after a credit for his acceptance of responsibility) would be 19, and that (given his prior criminal record) he would likely occupy criminal history category IV. On July 18, 2005, the district court accepted Freeman's plea, and sentenced him to 106 months in prison.

After Freeman's sentence was entered, the United States Sentencing Commission adopted Amendment 706. In 706, the Sentencing Commission aimed to reduce the sentencing disparity between offenses involving crack cocaine versus those involving powder cocaine. Prior to the Fair Sentencing Act of 2010, federal drug trafficking offenses involving over 5 grams of crack cocaine (or 500 grams of powder cocaine) were subject to a mandatory minimum term of imprisonment of 60 months (5 years), while such offenses involving over 50 grams of crack cocaine (or 5 kilograms of powder cocaine) were subject to a mandatory minimum term of imprisonment of 120 months (10 years). Before Amendment 706, the Sentencing Guidelines were designed so that the statutory crack threshold quantities produced guideline ranges above the corresponding mandatory minima. Amendment 706 sought to make those mandatory minima themselves available as guideline sentences.

For example, a pre-706 trafficking offense involving 5 grams of crack cocaine would correspond to a base offense level producing (assuming criminal history category (CHC) I) a guidelines range of 63-78 months. Likewise, a pre-706 trafficking offense involving 50 grams of crack cocaine would correspond to a base offense level producing (again, assuming CHC I) a guidelines range of 121-151 months. In both cases, the guidelines ranges necessarily exceeded the statutory mandatory minimum sentences of 60 and 120 months, respectively. After Amendment 706, the former would result in a guidelines range of 51-63 months, while the latter would result in a guidelines range of 97-121 months. Factoring in the statutory mandatory minima, those offenses would now yield guidelines ranges of 60-63 and 120-121 months, respectively. Amendment 706 was later given retroactive effect by Amendment 713.

After the amendments to the Sentencing Guidelines, Freeman sought to have his sentence reduced. He argued that his Rule 11(c)(1)(C) plea agreement was "based on" a subsequently-lowered sentencing range, and that he was thus entitled to relief under 18 U.S.C. § 3582(c)(2). Citing precedent from the United States Court of Appeals for the Sixth Circuit, the district court denied the motion. On November 20, 2009, the Sixth Circuit affirmed. It held that, under Peveler, Freeman's sentence was "based on" his Rule 11(c)(1)(C) plea agreement rather than the Sentencing Guidelines, and is thus not entitled to relief under § 3582(c)(2). The court denied rehearing en banc on January 12, 2010.

== Supreme Court ==
On April 7, 2010, Freeman petitioned the Supreme Court for a writ of certiorari. On September 28, the Court granted review. Oral arguments were heard on February 23, 2011. Frank W. Heft, Jr., argued the case on behalf of Freeman. Curtis E. Gannon argued the case on behalf of the United States. The Supreme Court issued its opinions on June 23, 2011.

=== Plurality opinion ===
Justice Kennedy authored a plurality opinion in which Justices Ginsburg, Breyer, and Kagan joined. The plurality concluded that defendants who enter into Rule 11(c)(1)(C) agreements that specify a particular sentence as a condition of the guilty plea may be eligible for relief under 18 U.S.C. § 3582(c)(2). The plurality concluded that the text and purpose of both the statute and the rule compel the conclusion that the district court has authority to entertain §3582(c)(2) motions when sentences are imposed in light of the Guidelines, even if the defendant enters into an 11(c)(1)(C) agreement. It noted that, at sentencing, the district court remarked that the sentence Freeman received was appropriate in light of the applicable Sentencing Guidelines range, and that the sentence he received was therefore "based on" that range for the purposes of § 3582(c)(2).

=== Opinion concurring in the judgment ===
Justice Sotomayor authored a solo opinion concurring in the judgment. As such, she agreed with the plurality that Freeman is eligible for relief under § 3582(c)(2), but declined to join any of the reasoning in the plurality opinion. Justice Sotomayor concluded that a sentence is "based on" the Sentencing Guidelines if the Rule 11(c)(1)(C) plea agreement itself explicitly relies on the Guidelines in arriving at the proposed term of imprisonment. She then concluded that the specified term of imprisonment in Freeman's plea agreement was calculated using the Guidelines, and that Freeman was thus eligible for a sentence reduction under § 3582(c)(2).

=== Dissenting opinion ===
Chief Justice Roberts authored a dissenting opinion in which Justices Scalia, Thomas, and Alito joined. Chief Justice Roberts agreed with Justice Sotomayor that Freeman's sentence was "based on" the Rule 11(c)(1)(C) plea agreement, rather than directly "based on" the Sentencing Guidelines. However, he disagreed with Justice Sotomayor's subsequent inquiry into whether the plea agreement used a Guidelines range to establish the specified term of imprisonment:

Only a court can sentence a defendant, so there is no basis for examining why the parties settled on a particular prison term ... Even if the Guidelines were “used” or “employed” by the parties in arriving at the Rule 11(c)(1)(C) sentencing term, they were not “applied when the defendant was sentenced.” Once the District Court accepted the agreement, all that was later “applied” was the sentence set forth in that agreement.

— Freeman, 564 U.S., at 547, 548 (Roberts, C.J., dissenting).

== Subsequent events ==
In Freeman, no opinion was joined by a majority of the Justices of the Court. In Marks v. United States, the Supreme Court held that “[w]hen a fragmented Court decides a case and no single rationale explaining the result enjoys the assent of five Justices, ‘the holding of the Court may be viewed as that position taken by those Members who concurred in the judgments on the narrowest grounds.’” However, the Freeman plurality and Justice Sotomayor's opinion shared no common rationale. As a result, lower courts struggled with how to apply the Marks rule to Freeman for years. In 2018, the Supreme Court revisited the same question in Hughes v. United States, where a majority of the Court held that a sentence imposed pursuant to a plea agreement under Federal Rule of Criminal Procedure 11(c)(1)(C) is "based on" the defendant's Guidelines range so long as that range was part of the framework the district court relied on in imposing the sentence or accepting the agreement.
