= Smith v. Bayer Corp. =

- Supreme Court of the United States

Decided June 16, 2011
- Full case name: Smith v. Bayer Corp.
- Citations: 564 U.S. 299 (more)

Holding
- Federal courts cannot issue orders to prevent state courts from issuing class certifications.

Court membership
- Chief Justice John Roberts Associate Justices Antonin Scalia · Anthony Kennedy; Clarence Thomas · Ruth Bader Ginsburg; Stephen Breyer · Samuel Alito; Sonia Sotomayor · Elena Kagan

Case opinion
- Majority: Kagan, joined by Roberts, Scalia, Kennedy, Ginsburg, Breyer, Alito, Sotomayor; Thomas (Parts I and II–A only)

Smith v. Bayer Corp., 564 U.S. 299 (2011), was a United States Supreme Court case in which the court held that federal courts cannot issue orders to prevent state courts from issuing class certifications.

== Background ==
Bayer moved in federal district court for an injunction ordering a West Virginia state court not to consider a motion for class certification filed by Smith and other plaintiffs in a state-court action. Bayer thought such an injunction was warranted because, in a separate case filed against Bayer by another person named George McCollins, Bayer had persuaded the same federal district court to deny a similar class-certification motion. The district court had denied McCollins' certification motion under Federal Rule of Civil Procedure 23.

The court granted Bayer’s requested injunction against the state court proceedings, holding that its denial of certification in McCollins' case precluded litigation of the certification issue in Smith's case. The Court of Appeals for the Eighth Circuit affirmed. It first noted that the Anti-Injunction Act generally prohibits federal courts from enjoining state court proceedings. But it found that the Act's relitigation exception authorized this injunction because ordinary rules of issue preclusion barred Smith from seeking certification of his proposed class. In so doing, the court concluded that Smith was invoking a state rule, West Virginia Rule of Civil Procedure 23, that was sufficiently similar to the Federal Rule McCollins had invoked, such that the certification issues presented in the two cases were the same. The court further held that Smith, as an unnamed member of McCollins' putative class action, could be bound by the judgment in McCollins' case.

== Opinion of the court ==
The Supreme Court issued an opinion written by Justice Elena Kagan on June 16, 2011. When Kagan announced the decision from the bench, she quipped that if you understand this ruling, you have a law degree and you've had a cup of coffee.
