= Emory Law School Supreme Court Advocacy Project =

The Emory Law School Supreme Court Advocacy Program (ELSSCAP) is an organization at Emory Law School dedicated to representing clients in the Supreme Court of the United States. Formed in 2010, the project joined a growing class of Supreme Court Clinics that provide expert representation under the guidance of experienced litigators. ELSSCAP principally represents clients on petitions for writ of certiorari, in opposition to certiorari, on the merits, or as amicus curiae. The program was founded by Professor David J. Bederman and Kedar Bhatia, then a first-year law student and now a contributor on SCOTUSBlog.com. Professor Paul Koster currently oversees the work of the group.

ELSSCAP filed four amicus briefs and two petitions for writ of certiorari in its first year. It has been recognized for its public service efforts and profiled in the National Law Journal for an amicus brief it filed in Florence v. Board of Chosen Freeholders representing a group of medical professionals. That amicus brief was later cited by Justice Stephen Breyer in his dissenting opinion in the case. In addition to advocating for clients, the project seeks to educate law students about the Supreme Court and about Supreme Court litigation through trips to the Supreme Court, guest speakers, and support for internship and job opportunities.

On October 29, 2012, the Supreme Court granted certiorari in the fourth case taken by the group, Bullock v. BankChampaign N.A.

Since 2010, ELSSCAP has filed over 40 pleadings with the Supreme Court, including cert petitions and amicus briefs.

ELSSCAP is run by an annually elected student executive board. The current director for the 2019–2020 school year is Colby Moore. Other board member positions include Deputy Director, Director of Operations, Director of Case Services, Director of Outreach, Director of Membership, Executive Editor, and 1L Representative.

== Case application process ==
Prospective clients may submit claims for consideration on ELSSCAP's website. Once submitted, the executive board will consider whether to accept the case.

https://law.emory.edu/student-life/student-organizations/emory-law-school-supreme-court-advocacy-program-elsscap.html
