= Plurality (voting) =

Poll most votes, but less than half overall

Pie charts illustrating the difference between a mere plurality (where the green/bottom area is less than 50% of the total area) and a majority (where the green/bottom area is greater than 50% of the total area of the pie chart).

A plurality vote (in North American English) or relative majority (in British English) describes the circumstance when a party, candidate, or proposition polls more votes than any other but does not receive a majority or more than half of all votes cast.

For example, if from 100 votes that were cast, 45 were for candidate A, 30 were for candidate B and 25 were for candidate C, then candidate A received a plurality of votes but not a majority. In some election contests, the winning candidate or proposition may need only a plurality, depending on the rules of the organization holding the vote.

== Versus majority ==
In international institutional law, a simple majority (also a plurality) is the largest number of votes cast (disregarding abstentions) among alternatives. In many jurisdictions, a simple majority is a stronger requirement than a plurality (yet weaker than an absolute majority) in that more votes than half cast, excluding abstentions, are required.

An absolute majority (also a majority) is a number of votes "greater than the number of votes that possibly can be obtained at the same time for any other solution", (Note: For example, 50 voters elect six office holders from a field of 11 candidates, thereby casting 300 votes. The largest absolute majority in this scenario would be 50 voters casting all their ballots for the same six candidates, which at 300 votes would be substantially higher than the simple majority of 151 votes—a result that no individual candidate can achieve, since the most votes any one can receive is 50. With the smallest absolute majority in this scenario, the six winners would receive 28 votes each, totaling 168, and the runners-up would receive either 27 or 26 votes each.) when voting for multiple alternatives at a time (Note: An absolute majority can also mean a "majority of the entire membership", a voting basis that requires that more than half of all the members of a body (including those absent and those present but not voting) to vote in favour of a proposition in order for it to be passed.)

A qualified majority (also a supermajority) is a number of votes above a specified percentage (e.g. two-thirds); a relative majority (also a plurality) is the number of votes obtained that is greater than any other option.

Henry Watson Fowler suggested that the American terms plurality and majority offer single-word alternatives for the corresponding two-word terms in British English, relative majority and absolute majority, and that in British English majority is sometimes understood to mean "receiving the most votes" and can therefore be confused with plurality. (Note: "With three-cornered contests as common as they now are, we may have occasion to find a convenient single word for what we used to call an absolute majority... In America the word majority itself has that meaning while a poll greater than that of any other candidate, but less than half the votes cast is called a plurality. It might be useful to borrow this distinction..." —Henry Watson Fowler)

In strict electoral sense (especially in American English) the terms plurality and majority can not overlap and are mutually exclusive. A plurality refers to receiving the most votes but less than half of the total, whereas a majority refers to receiving the most votes exceeding half of the total.

== See also ==
- Plurality voting system
- Plurality-at-large voting
- Plurality opinion
- Voting system
