= Flores-Villar v. United States =

- Supreme Court of the United States

Decided June 13, 2011
- Full case name: Flores-Villar v. United States
- Citations: 564 U.S. 210 (more)

Holding
- Lower court upheld by an equally divided court.

Court membership
- Chief Justice John Roberts Associate Justices Antonin Scalia · Anthony Kennedy; Clarence Thomas · Ruth Bader Ginsburg; Stephen Breyer · Samuel Alito; Sonia Sotomayor · Elena Kagan

Case opinion
- Per curiam

Flores-Villar v. United States, 564 U.S. 210 (2011), was a United States Supreme Court case that addressed the precedent set by Nguyen v. INS, 533 U.S. 53 (2001), which upheld a law imposing different requirements in situations regarding children born out of wedlock to U.S. citizen fathers versus U.S. citizen mothers. Flores-Villar attempted to challenge the gender discrimination between these requirements, but was ultimately unsuccessful, as the Supreme Court issued a per curiam decision with a 4-4 split, leaving the United States Court of Appeals for the Ninth Circuit's ruling in place without setting a binding precedent.

== Background ==
On October 7, 1974, Ruben Flores-Villar was born in Tijuana, Mexico, to his mother, Maria Mercedes Negrete. His father, Ruben Trinidad Floresvillar-Sandez, who was sixteen at the time, was not listed on his birth certificate. However, he later acknowledged paternity through a Civil Registry filing in Mexico on June 2, 1985. At the time of Flores-Villar's birth, neither of his parents were recognized as U.S. citizens. However, this changed on May 24, 1999, when Floresvillar-Sandez was issued a Certificate of Citizenship based on his mother being a U.S. citizen by birth. Although Flores-Villar was born in Mexico to a Mexican national mother, he was brought to San Diego, California, at two months old for medical treatment and was raised there by his U.S. citizen father and paternal grandmother. His parents were never married, including at the time of his conception or birth

On March 17, 1991, Flores-Villar was convicted of importing marijuana, which led to his deportation to Mexico on six different occasions: October 6, 1998; April 16, 1999; June 4, 1999; June 6, 2003; October 20, 2005; and March 28, 2006. During this period, on February 24, 2006, he was arrested and charged by a California federal district court for illegal entry after deportation without legal permission.

Flores-Villar appealed his 2006 arrest and deportation, claiming U.S. citizenship through his father. He also applied for a Certificate of Citizenship, as his father did in 1999, but was rejected by the United States Court of Appeals for the Ninth Circuit in San Francisco. The application was denied on the basis of U.S.C. §§ 1401(a)(7), which states that fathers may only transmit citizenship to children if they lived in the United States before the child was born for a total of ten years, with five of those years being after the age of fourteen. Floresvillar-Sandez, his father, could not have met this requirement due to him being sixteen years old at the time of Flores-Villar's birth. However, the same law states that mothers are able to transmit citizenship after only living in the United States for a year before the child is born. Flores-Villar attempted to bring forth evidence of his citizenship, but the court denied this motion and convicted him. This led to Flores-Villar's final appeal on the grounds that the provisions under U.S.C. § 1401 violated the Equal Protection Clause of the Fourteenth Amendment on the basis of age and gender. The case was argued before the Supreme Court on November 10, 2010.

== Decision ==
On June 13, 2011, in a 4-4 split, the United States Supreme Court issued a per curiam, or group, decision that upheld the U.S. Court of Appeals for the Ninth Circuit's ruling in United States v. Ruben Flores-Villar (2008). The Court's ruling affirmed the Ninth Circuit's reasoning, relying on the precedent established in Nguyen v. INS, 533 U.S. 53 (2001), that the law is constitutional under Congress's plenary power in the area of immigration and citizenship, on the grounds of avoiding statelessness and establishing a meaningful relationship between an unwed citizen father, his child, and the United States. While the law was not entirely aligned with the facts of Flores-Villar's case, the Ninth Circuit emphasized that the differences in residency requirements for fathers and mothers provided a structure to further the objectives mentioned above.

== Significance ==
Flores-Villar v. United States upheld the different gender-based requirements of unwed fathers wishing to transmit U.S. citizenship to their foreign-born children. In addition, by setting no binding precedent due to the 4-4 split, the Supreme Court's decision left lower courts to determine whether to uphold similar arguments in future cases.

In 2017, the Supreme Court heard the case of Sessions v. Morales-Santana, ruling that the difference in "physical presence requirements for transferral of derivative unwed citizen mothers and unwed citizen fathers of foreign-born children violates the Equal Protection Clause of the Fifth Amendment".
