= Turner v. Rogers =

- Supreme Court of the United States

Argued March 23, 2011 Decided June 20, 2011
- Full case name: Michael D. Turner v. Rebecca L. Rogers
- Docket no.: 10-10
- Citations: 564 U.S. 431 (more) 131 S. Ct. 2507; 180 L. Ed. 2d 452
- Argument: Oral argument
- Decision: Opinion

Case history
- Prior: Defendant convicted at trial (Oconee Cty Fam. Ct.); affirmed sub nom. Price v. Turner, 387 S.C. 142, 691 S.E.2d 470 (S.C. 2010); cert. granted, 562 U.S. 1002 (2010).

Holding
- The Due Process Clause of the 14th Amendment, while it does not require a state to provide counsel at civil contempt proceedings to indigent individuals, even if incarceration is a possibility, does require some safeguards to prevent the erroneous deprivation of liberty. South Carolina Supreme Court reversed and remanded.

Court membership
- Chief Justice John Roberts Associate Justices Antonin Scalia · Anthony Kennedy; Clarence Thomas · Ruth Bader Ginsburg; Stephen Breyer · Samuel Alito; Sonia Sotomayor · Elena Kagan

Case opinions
- Majority: Breyer, joined by Kennedy, Ginsburg, Sotomayor, Kagan
- Dissent: Thomas, joined by Scalia; Roberts, Alito (Parts I–B and II)

Laws applied
- U.S. Const. amends. VI, XIV

Turner v. Rogers, 564 U.S. 431 (2011), is a case that was decided by the United States Supreme Court on June 20, 2011, relating to the Due Process Clause of the 14th Amendment. The Court held that Turner was not entitled to a public defender in cases regarding family nonsupport. However, in cases in which a state is not required to provide counsel, it must provide some other safeguard to reduce the risk of erroneous deprivation of liberty in civil contempt cases. The particular case the Court took under review was a child support payment case and the point of contention was the process of the defendant's income determination by the court.

== Background ==
Michael D. Turner, the petitioner, was jailed six times between 2003 and 2010 for accumulated child support payment arrears. The duration of Turner's jail spells ranged from one day to eight months. A person being in arrears on child support payments is not unusual: in 2008, 11.2 million U.S. child support cases had arrears due. The number of persons kept in jail or in prison for child support arrears is not generally tracked. Based on a publicly available collection of relevant data, an estimated 50,000 persons are kept in jail or in prison on any given day in the U.S. for child support arrears. Additionally, over $100 billion in child support payments is overdue.

During his most recent term in prison, Turner appealed his sentencing, claiming that he was entitled to counsel at his hearing. Before the case was heard by the South Carolina Supreme Court, however, Turner's sentence expired, and the South Carolina Supreme Court subsequently rejected the claim, distinguishing between civil contempt and criminal contempt, arguing that counsel was only required for the latter. Turner's pro bono counsel then appealed the case on Turner's behalf to the U.S. Supreme Court.

== Questions presented ==
1. Whether the Supreme Court of South Carolina erred in holding — in conflict with twenty-two federal courts of appeals and state courts of last resort — that an indigent defendant has no constitutional right to appointed counsel at a civil contempt proceeding that results in his incarceration
2. Whether the Court has jurisdiction to review the decision of the South Carolina Supreme Court.

== Ruling ==
In a 5–4 decision written by Justice Stephen Breyer, the Court first rejected the claim of mootness by South Carolina, reasoning that the period of Turner's sentence was too short to allow for full adjudication of the sentence prior to expiration and that the likelihood of Turner being subjected to civil contempt proceedings again rendered the claim not moot (distinguishing this case from DeFunis v. Odegaard). On the merits, Justice Breyer held that a state is under no obligation to provide a public defender to indigent respondents in civil contempt cases, especially if the plaintiff is also not represented by counsel. However, Justice Breyer noted that the South Carolina courts were under an obligation to provide an alternative procedure to ensure a fair determination of the case. Since Turner did not have clear notice that "ability to pay" would be the critical question in this proceeding, nor was he provided with information or forms that would have allowed Turner to disclose such information, the South Carolina courts erred in finding him able to pay and subsequently holding him in civil contempt. Justice Breyer stated:

Third, as the Solicitor General points out, there is available a set of “substitute procedural safeguards,” Mathews, 424 U.S., at 335, 96S.Ct. 893, which, if employed together, can significantly reduce the risk of an erroneous deprivation of liberty. They can do so, moreover, without incurring some of the drawbacks inherent in recognizing an automatic right to counsel. Those safeguards include (1) notice to the defendant that his “ability to pay” is a critical issue in the contempt proceeding; (2) the use of a form (or the equivalent) to elicit relevant financial information; (3) an opportunity at the hearing for the defendant to respond to statements and questions about his financial status, (e.g., those triggered by his responses on the form); and (4) an express finding by the court that the defendant has the ability to pay.

Justice Breyer went on to reiterate what Due Process requires in lieu of appointment of counsel in civil proceedings:

We consequently hold that the Due Process Clause does not automatically require the provision of counsel at civil contempt proceedings to an indigent individual who is subject to a child support order, even if that individual faces incarceration (for up to a year). In particular, that Clause does not require the provision of counsel where the opposing parent or other custodian (to whom support funds are owed) is not represented by counsel and the State provides alternative procedural safeguards equivalent to those we have mentioned (adequate notice of the importance of ability to pay, fair opportunity to present, and to dispute, relevant information and court findings).

Thus, there must be notice to the obligor-parent that his/her ability to pay is at issue. Then there must be forms designed to elicit this information and a consideration by the court of the obligor-parent's ability to pay. After this, courts are then required to make a specific finding in child support contempt cases whether or not the obligor-parent has or had the ability to pay in order to satisfy Due Process.

However, Justice Breyer specifically declined to address whether Due Process would require the appointment of counsel in complex cases or when the state is collecting support payments overdue to the state, because in the scenario the state would be represented by counsel. Breyer seemed to recognize that the "average defendant" probably lacks the skill to adequately defend themselves. Breyer quoted from Johnson v. Zerbst, 304 U.S. 458, 462–463, 58S.Ct. 1019, 82 L.Ed. 1461 (1938), stating with emphasis:

([T]he average defendant does not have the professional legal skill to protect himself when brought before a tribunal with power to take his life or liberty, wherein the prosecution is presented by experienced and learned counsel (emphasis added)). And this kind of proceeding is not before us. Neither do we address what due process requires in an unusually complex case where a defendant can fairly be represented only by a trained advocate.

=== Dissent ===
Justice Clarence Thomas authored a dissenting opinion, arguing that the majority ruled on grounds never raised by the parties during litigation. He noted that the Fourteenth Amendment never provided for alternative safeguards to ensure that protections under the Fourteenth Amendment were not violated, and that the Sixth Amendment right to counsel only applies to criminal prosecutions and not civil cases. Thomas further argued that the majority opinion did not consider the effects of this decision with respect to child support payments, and expressed concern that the majority opinion would undermine state efforts to collect child support payments.

== Legacy ==
Because states are free to provide constitutional protections greater than those provided by the federal government under the United States Constitution, the Turner ruling did not overturn the requirements of many states that counsel be appointed for indigent litigants facing incarceration at civil contempt hearings.

The federal agency responsible for enforcing child support is the Office of Child Support Enforcement (OCSE). In response to the Turner decision, OCSE responded that states should review their procedures to ensure that the proceedings are fair by giving the obligor-parents an opportunity to provide and respond to questions regarding their finances and ability to pay. The Office of Child Support Enforcement Commissioner's blog states:

As a result of the Turner v. Rogers decision, state child support agencies and courts are examining their civil contempt procedures. The goal is not to eliminate contempt procedures in cases where it may be appropriate, but instead to implement fair and cost-effective procedures that assure that families receive reliable child support payments, improve fairness and access to justice for parents without an attorney, and reduce the need for jail time. Incarceration may indeed be appropriate in those cases where noncustodial parents can afford to support their children but willfully evade their parental responsibilities by hiding income and assets. However, jail is not appropriate for noncustodial parents who do not have the means to pay their child support debts. The first step to reducing the need for contempt hearings is to set accurate child support orders. The research is clear that setting realistic orders based on actual income can actually improve compliance, increasing both the amount of child support collected and the consistency of payment. The research says that compliance falls off when orders are set above 15 to 20 percent of a noncustodial parent’s income.

The decision in Turner has also provided reasoning to legal commentators who assume that incarceration for nonsupport is a civil punishment and not criminal in nature. Critiques of the case's holding point to the often devastating and disparate impact of child support enforcement on poor and minority fathers and their families. Scholars also argue that the Turner decision allowed state courts to relabel criminal punishments as civil ones, allowing limitation and circumvention of constitutionally mandated procedural protections. Prior to this case, South Carolina established domestic relations courts that increasingly used civil contempt as opposed to criminal statutes to incarcerate debtors. The "alternative procedural safeguards" advanced by the Turner majority has done little in the way of protecting indigent parents in contempt proceedings.
