= Tapia v. United States =

- Supreme Court of the United States

Argued April 18, 2011 Decided June 16, 2011
- Full case name: Alejandra Tapia, Petitioner v. United States
- Docket no.: 10-5400
- Citations: 564 U.S. 319 (more) 131 S. Ct. 2382; 180 L. Ed. 2d 357; 2011 U.S. LEXIS 4556; 79 U.S.L.W. 4521; 22 Fla. L. Weekly Fed. S 1160

Case history
- Prior: Defendant convicted, 3:08-CR-00249-BTM (S.D. Cal. 2010); affirmed, 376 F. App'x 707 (9th Cir. 2010); cert. granted, 562 U.S. 1104 (2010).

Holding
- The Sentencing Reform Act precludes a federal court from imposing or lengthening a prison sentence for the purposes of rehabilitation.

Court membership
- Chief Justice John Roberts Associate Justices Antonin Scalia · Anthony Kennedy; Clarence Thomas · Ruth Bader Ginsburg; Stephen Breyer · Samuel Alito; Sonia Sotomayor · Elena Kagan

Case opinions
- Majority: Kagan, joined by unanimous
- Concurrence: Sotomayor, joined by Alito

Laws applied
- 18 U.S.C. § 3582a

Tapia v. United States, 564 U.S. 319 (2011), was a United States Supreme Court case in which the Court held that a federal court cannot give a criminal defendant a longer sentence to promote rehabilitation.

== Background ==
Alejandra Tapia was sentenced to 51 months in federal prison for bringing an illegal immigrant into the United States for financial gain. Tapia challenged the basis for the District Court's sentencing decision. Specifically, Tapia challenged basing the length of sentence on speculation about when Tapia would be able to enter and complete the Bureau of Prisons' drug abuse treatment program. In a brief order, the Ninth Circuit Court of Appeals, relying on its previous decisions, affirmed the decision.

Tapia petitioned the Supreme Court for certiorari, citing the circuit split on the issue. Specifically, the Eighth and Ninth Circuits permit the use of rehabilitation as a factor in sentencing, while four other circuit courts prohibit it. The Court agreed to hear the case on that issue.

== Opinion of the Court ==
Oral arguments
Recording of oral arguments before the Supreme Court.

The issue before the Court was whether the Sentencing Reform Act precludes a federal court from imposing or lengthening a prison term for the purposes of prompting rehabilitation. The Court held in a unanimous opinion that it does. First considered by the Court was the language of the Sentencing Reform Act, specifically that a court must "recogniz[e] that imprisonment is not an appropriate means of promoting correction and rehabilitation." Further, the act instructs the courts to acknowledge this fact when "determining whether to impose a term of imprisonment, and... [when] determining the length of the term."

=== Concurrence ===
Justice Sotomayor wrote a concurring opinion, joined by Justice Alito, in which she expressed "skepticism that the District Judge [had actually] violated this proscription in this case".
