= Plurality decision =

Court decision with no majority opinion

A plurality decision is a court decision in which no opinion received the support of a majority of the judges.

A plurality opinion is the judicial opinion or opinions which received the most support among those opinions which supported the plurality decision. The plurality opinion did not receive the support of more than half the justices, but still received more support than any other opinion, excluding those justices dissenting from the holding of the court.

== By country ==
=== United States ===
In Marks v. United States, 430 U.S. 188 (1977), the Supreme Court of the United States explained how the holding of a case should be viewed where there is no majority supporting the rationale of any opinion: "When a fragmented Court decides a case and no single rationale explaining the result enjoys the assent of five Justices, the holding of the Court may be viewed as that position taken by those Members who concurred in the judgments on the narrowest grounds."

That requires lower courts to look at all opinions to determine which is the most narrow compared to others. This opinion will be called the controlling opinion, and can be a mere concurrence, not the plurality.

The Marks rule has raised the following schools of thought regarding the appropriate basis for determining the holding in such fractured cases: (a) the narrowest analysis essential to the result derived from a combination of all concurring opinions, (b) the concurring opinion offering the narrowest rationale, or (c) only those parts of the concurring opinions which overlap and arrive at the same result. For example, if one follows the first interpretation, then the holding in the case should be viewed as the narrowest rationale supported by all of the concurring opinions read together as though it were a single majority opinion, and where there is a conflict, the opinion based on the narrowest ground governs. Followers of the second rationale would find the concurring opinion offering the narrowest analysis to be the holding. Whereas, under the third interpretation, only the rationale(s) common to all concurring opinions which arrive at the same result(s) (and to the exclusion of all other rationales) is considered the holding.

A good example of a plurality opinion can be found in the Supreme Court's decision in Crawford v. Marion County Election Board, 553 U.S. 181 (2008). In considering whether Indiana's voter identification law passed constitutional muster, three justices believed the proper analysis was to apply the balancing approach laid down in Anderson v. Celebrezze, 460 U.S. 780 (1983). Three other justices agreed with the outcome of the Anderson approach, but believed the proper analysis was to apply the rule in Burdick v. Takushi, 504 U.S. 428 (1992), which "forged Anderson's amorphous 'flexible standard' into something resembling an administrable rule". Regardless of the approach used, a reading of the opinions together results in a holding that "neutral, nondiscriminatory regulation of voting procedure" is constitutional so long as the burden imposed by the regulation is minimal or not severe.

== See also ==
- Plurality (voting)
