= Supreme court building =

The term "Supreme court building" refers to buildings housing supreme courts in a number of countries, including the following:

Present supreme court buildings

- Canada – Supreme Court Building
- India – Supreme Court Building
- Israel – Supreme Court Building
- Pakistan – Supreme Court Building
- Singapore – Supreme Court Building
- United Kingdom – Supreme Court Building
- United States – United States Supreme Court Building
  - Puerto Rico (U.S. territory) – Supreme Court Building (Puerto Rico)

Former supreme court buildings

- Germany – Imperial Supreme Court Building
- Hong Kong – Old Supreme Court Building, Hong Kong
- Singapore – Old Supreme Court Building, Singapore
