= United States v. Juvenile Male =

United States v. Juvenile Male may refer to two per curiam opinions by the Supreme Court of the United States handed down at different times in the same case:

- United States v. Juvenile Male, 560 U.S. 558 (2010), certifying a question to the Montana Supreme Court in a case involving a challenge to the federal Sex Offender Notification and Registration Act
- United States v. Juvenile Male, 564 U.S. 932 (2011), vacating the lower court's judgment because the case had become moot
