= DeFunis v. Odegaard =

- Supreme Court of the United States

Argued February 26, 1974 Decided April 23, 1974
- Full case name: Marco DeFunis, Jr., et al. v. Odegaard, et al.
- Citations: 416 U.S. 312 (more) 94 S. Ct. 1704; 40 L. Ed. 2d 164; 1974 U.S. LEXIS 128

Case history
- Prior: 82 Wash. 2d 11, 507 P.2d 1169 (1973); cert. granted, 414 U.S. 1038 (1973).
- Subsequent: On remand, 84 Wash. 2d 617, 529 P.2d 438 (1974).

Holding
- The Court held that the case was moot.

Court membership
- Chief Justice Warren E. Burger Associate Justices William O. Douglas · William J. Brennan Jr. Potter Stewart · Byron White; Thurgood Marshall · Harry Blackmun; Lewis F. Powell Jr. · William Rehnquist

Case opinions
- Per curiam
- Dissent: Douglas
- Dissent: Brennan, joined by Douglas, White, Marshall

Laws applied
- U.S. Const.

DeFunis v. Odegaard, 416 U.S. 312 (1974), was a United States Supreme Court case in which the Court held that the case had become moot and so declined to render a decision on the merits. American student Marco DeFunis, who had been denied admission to the University of Washington School of Law in the state of Washington before he was provisionally admitted during the pendency of the case, was slated to graduate within a few months of the decision being rendered.

The Court rejected the assertion that the case was in one of two exceptions to the mootness doctrine that were raised by the plaintiff. The case did not constitute "voluntary cessation" on the part of the defendant law school, as the plaintiff was in his final quarter, and the law school could take no action to prevent him from graduating. Also, it was not a question that was "capable of repetition, yet evading review" because the plaintiff would never again face the situation, and others who might raise the same complaint in the future might be able to receive the court's full review.

DeFunis argued that materials brought to light during discovery and entered into evidence in the trial court showed that his initial denial of admission to the law school was the result of the law school's affirmative action policy, which favored the admission of minority applicants over better-qualified white candidates. Although the Court refused to consider the case on the merits in DeFunis, the issue of affirmative action returned to the Court without any problem of mootness, with an opinion on the merits achieved in Regents of the University of California v. Bakke.

== Background ==
In 1970, Marco DeFunis, a Sephardic Jewish man, applied for entry to the law program at the University of Washington. He was denied, but after filing a lawsuit, a state court ordered that he was to be admitted in the fall of 1971. Later, the Supreme Court of Washington reversed the Court's ruling, prompting DeFunis to appeal to the US Supreme Court. By the time the Court heard the case in early 1974, it was DeFunis's final year of the law program. DeFunis, believing he had been rejected because of affirmative action, thought the school had admitted applicants not because of their accomplishments but because of their race.

He took his case to court arguing that affirmative action violated the Equal Protection Clause of the Fourteenth Amendment to the United States Constitution.

== Lower courts ==
The case was first heard in the Superior Court of Washington, where the University of Washington moved to dismiss the case on the grounds that relief could not be granted. The court rejected the proposed dismissal and filed an injunction requiring the school to admit DeFunis. The university argued that it used a complex formula, the Predicted First-Year Average (PFYA), to predict applicants' success, but that the formula was not the only factor considered during the application process.

Applicants with higher PFYA scores were reviewed and were presented by a committee member before the whole committee. Which committee member represented a student was usually up to chance, but not in the case of African American and other minority students. Their files were reviewed by three specific board members: Professor Geoffrey Crooks (director of the school's Council on Legal Education Opportunities program), Vincent Hayes (a second-year black law student), and Associate Dean Robert S. Hunt (the sole evaluator of the files of minorities other than African Americans). The court found that, in reviewing the files of minority applicants, the committee attached less weight to the PFYA in making a total judgmental evaluation as to the relative ability of the particular applicant to succeed in law school. Also, the chairman testified that although the same standard was applied to all applicants (the relative probability of the individual succeeding in law school), minority applicants were directly compared to one another, not to applicants outside of the minority group. As a result, the committee admitted a group of minority applicants, placed a group of such applicants on a waiting list, and rejected other minority applicants. The dean of the law school testified that the law school had no fixed admissions quota for minority students but that the committee sought a reasonable representation of such groups in the law school. He added that the school had accepted no unqualified minority applicants but only those whose records indicated that they were capable of successfully completing the law school program. Because of the judgmental factors in the admissions process, as outlined, the ultimate determination of applicants to whom admission was offered did not follow exactly the relative ranking of PFYAs. Of those invited, 74 had lower PFYAs than the plaintiff's; 36 of them were minority applicants, 22 were returning from military service, and 16 were applicants judged by the committee as deserving invitations on the basis of other information contained in their files. There were 29 applicants with higher PFYAs than the plaintiff's who were denied admission. Of the 36 minority-group students invited, 18 actually enrolled in the first-year class. The law faculty was, as the court observed, motivated by a laudable purpose: to increase the number of minority students studying law and to equalize opportunities among applicants who come from the lower-income and economic groups with those who come from the higher-income groups. That policy of ethnic minority selection apparently was not to apply to faculty positions, as the record does not show that any qualified white applicant for the teaching staff was refused or that any faculty member was ousted to make room for law teachers from a minority ethnic group with questionable credentials.

The court's opinion reflected heavily on the Supreme Court's 1954 ruling on Brown v. Board of Education when it began ruling, and so the injunction was filed. The Supreme Court of Washington expressed opinions on the case, with Justice Hale going stating, "Preferential treatment under the guise of 'affirmative action' is the imposition of one form of racial discrimination in place of another. The questions that must be asked in this regard are: must an individual sacrifice his right to be judged on his own merit by accepting discrimination based solely on the color of his skin? How can we achieve the goal of equal opportunity for all if, in the process, we deny equal opportunity to some?" Justice Hunter concurred: "The majority supports a laudable purpose — to enable students of certain minority races to enter the University of Washington School of Law in order that ultimately there will be a greater representation of practicing lawyers of those races in the legal profession — with which purpose I do not disagree. This must not be accomplished, however, by clear and willful discrimination against students of other races as the Admissions Committee of the University of Washington School of Law has done in this case by denying admission to the respondent, Marco DeFunis, Jr., to this school, as found by the trial court and amply supported by the record."

== Supreme Court ==
When the case reached the Supreme Court, DeFunis was already in his final year of law school. The court ruled it was moot since neither party had anything to gain from the court's ruling.

== See also ==
- List of United States Supreme Court cases, volume 416
