= Supreme Court clinic =

American law school clinic

A Supreme Court Clinic is a law school clinic that provides hands-on legal experience in Supreme Court Litigation to law students. Clinics are usually directed by clinical professors and experienced Supreme Court litigators and typically represent indigent or non-profit clients in the Supreme Court of the United States. Assistance is provided pro bono.

Supreme Court Clinics exist at Stanford Law School, Northwestern University Pritzker School of Law, The University of Chicago Law School, New York University Law School, Yale Law School, Harvard Law School, The University of Virginia School of Law, The University of Texas School of Law, Emory University School of Law, George Mason University School of Law, Southwestern Law School, UCLA School of Law, University of Pennsylvania Law School, University of North Carolina School of Law, and West Virginia University College of Law. Supreme Court clinics generally file amicus briefs ("friend of the Court briefs"); petitions for certiorari, which are formal requests to the Court to decide a case; and merits briefs, which are formal legal arguments presented to the Court after it has agreed to take a case. Typically, experienced Supreme Court litigators help run the clinics. It is these litigators who represent the clinics before the Court during oral arguments.

The first Supreme Court Clinic was founded at Stanford Law School in 2004 and, by March 2006, the Supreme Court had agreed to hear five cases the clinic helped file and declined to hear three. Northwestern Law was the second school to establish their clinic, in partnership with Sidley Austin in Fall 2006 as a part of the Appellate Advocacy Center. The Supreme Court Litigation Clinic at NYU School of Law was formed in Fall 2007. The Supreme Court Clinic at the University of Texas School of Law was formed in Fall 2006; the Yale Supreme Court Advocacy Clinic was formed in Fall 2006; and the University of Virginia Supreme Court Litigation Clinic was formed in Fall 2006. Harvard Law School announced that it will launch a Supreme Court Clinic in Fall 2007. The University of Pennsylvania opened its Supreme Court Clinic Fall 2009. The Emory Law School Supreme Court Advocacy Project, the first largely student-run Supreme Court Clinic, started in Fall 2010. The Jenner & Block Supreme Court and Appellate Clinic at the University of Chicago Law School was established in 2016. Since then, Supreme Court clinics have popped up at the law schools of UCLA, West Virginia University, and the University of North Carolina at Chapel Hill (Supreme Court Program).

== Criticism ==
Supreme Court clinics have been criticized for perverse incentives, as a desire for participation by students may lead these clinics to take cases and argue for certiorari in cases which might be counterproductive to the aims of their clients or the law they are seeking to develop.
