= Marks v. United States =

- Supreme Court of the United States

Argued November 1–2, 1976 Decided March 1, 1977
- Full case name: Marks et al v. United States
- Docket no.: 75-708
- Citations: 430 U.S. 188 (more) 97 S. Ct. 990; 51 L. Ed. 2d 260
- Argument: Oral argument

Case history
- Prior: United States v. Marks, 364 F. Supp. 1022 (E.D. Ky. 1973); affirmed, 520 F.2d 913 (6th Cir. 1975); cert. granted, 424 U.S. 942 (1976).

Holding
- When a fragmented Court decides a case and no single rationale explaining the result enjoys the assent of five Justices, the holding of the Court may be viewed as that position taken by those Members who concurred in the judgments on the narrowest grounds.

Court membership
- Chief Justice Warren E. Burger Associate Justices William J. Brennan Jr. · Potter Stewart; Byron White · Thurgood Marshall; Harry Blackmun · Lewis F. Powell Jr. William Rehnquist · John P. Stevens

Case opinions
- Majority: Powell, joined by Burger, White, Blackmun, Rehnquist
- Concur/dissent: Brennan, joined by Stewart, Marshall
- Concur/dissent: Stevens

Marks v. United States, 430 U.S. 188 (1977), is a decision of the Supreme Court of the United States that explained how the holding of a case should be viewed where there is no majority supporting the rationale of any opinion.

== Background ==
Petitioners were charged with several counts of transporting obscene materials in interstate commerce and conspiracy to transport such materials. The conduct that gave rise to the charges covered a period through February 27, 1973, though the trial did not begin until October 1974. In the interim, on June 21, 1973, the Supreme Court decided Miller v. California, which announced new standards for isolating "hard core" pornography from expression protected by the First Amendment, the third test of which was "whether the work, taken as a whole, lacks serious literary, artistic, political, or scientific value". Petitioners argued in the District Court that they were entitled to jury instructions not under Miller, but under the more favorable 1966 formulation found in the case Memoirs v. Massachusetts that expressive material is constitutionally protected unless it is "utterly without redeeming social value." The district court noted that the Constitution's Ex Post Facto Clause is a limitation upon the powers of the legislature, and does not of its own force apply to the judicial branch of government. However, the principle on which the clause is based—the notion that persons have a right to fair warning of that conduct which will give rise to criminal penalties—is fundamental to the concept of constitutional liberty.

Petitioners next asserted that Miller unforeseeably expanded the reach of the federal obscenity statutes beyond what was punishable under Memoirs. The Court of Appeals rejected this argument, noting that the Memoirs standards had never commanded the assent of more than three Justices at any one time, and concluded from this fact that Memoirs had never become law. It therefore applied the "contemporary community standards" test from the 1957 case Roth v. United States, which was stricter than the Memoirs test.

== Opinion of the Court ==
The court rejected the petitioners' line of reasoning. Citing to the plurality opinion of Justices Potter Stewart, Lewis Powell, and John Paul Stevens in the 1976 case Gregg v. Georgia, the court held that when a fragmented court decides a case and no single rationale explaining the result enjoys the assent of five Justices, "the holding of the Court may be viewed as that position taken by those members who concurred in the judgments on the narrowest grounds". Three Justices had joined in the controlling opinion in Memoirs. Two others, Justice Black and Justice Douglas, had concurred on broader grounds, reiterating their position that the First Amendment provides an absolute shield against governmental action aimed at suppressing obscenity. Justice Stewart had also concurred in the judgment based on his view that only "hardcore pornography" may be suppressed. The view of the Memoirs plurality therefore constituted the holding of the court and provided the governing standards at the time the alleged crimes were committed. Miller marked a significant departure from Memoirs and the third test announced in Miller had certainly expanded criminal liability. Since the petitioners were indicted for conduct occurring prior to the court's decision in Miller, the court found that they were entitled to jury instructions requiring the jury to acquit unless it found that the materials involved were "utterly without redeeming social value."

== See also ==
- Plurality opinion
