= Fair Labor Standards Act of 1938 =

United States wage law

- Long title: An Act to provide for the establishment of fair labor standards in employments in and affecting interstate commerce, and for other purposes
- Acronyms (colloquial): FLSA
- Enacted by: the 75th United States Congress
- Effective: June 25, 1938; 88 years ago

Citations
- Public law: Pub. L. 75–718
- Statutes at Large: 52 Stat. 1060 through 52 Stat. 1070 (3 pages)

Legislative history
- Signed into law by President Franklin D. Roosevelt on June 25, 1938

United States Supreme Court cases
- List: United States v. American Trucking Ass'ns, 310 U.S. 534 (1940); United States v. Darby Lumber Co., 312 U.S. 100 (1941); OPP Cotton Mills, Inc. v. Administrator of Wage and Hour Div., Dept. of Labor, 312 U.S. 126 (1941); Cudahy Packing Co. v. Holland, 315 U.S. 357 (1942); Williams v. Jacksonville Terminal Co., 315 U.S. 386 (1942); AB Kirschbaum Co. v. Walling, 316 U.S. 517 (1942); Skidmore v. Swift & Co., 323 U.S. 134 (1944); Brooklyn Savings Bank v. O'Neil, 324 U.S. 697 (1945); Mitchell v. Robert DeMario Jewelry, Inc., 361 U.S. 288 (1960); Arnold v. Ben Kanowsky, Inc., 361 U.S. 388 (1960); Maryland v. Wirtz, 392 U.S. 183 (1968); National League of Cities v. Usery, 426 U.S. 833 (1976); Garcia v. San Antonio Metropolitan Transit Authority, 469 U.S. 528 (1985); Tony and Susan Alamo Found. v. Secretary of Labor, 471 U.S. 290 (1985); Moreau v. Klevenhagen, 508 U.S. 22 (1993); Auer v. Robbins, 519 U.S. 452 (1997); Alden v. Maine, 527 U.S. 706 (1999); Christensen v. Harris County, 529 U.S. 576 (2000); Breuer v. Jim's Concrete of Brevard, Inc., 538 U.S. 691 (2003); IBP, Inc. v. Alvarez, 546 U.S. 21 (2005); Kasten v. Saint-Gobain Performance Plastics Corp., 563 U.S. 1 (2011); Christopher v. Smithkline Beecham Corp., 567 U.S. 142 (2012); Genesis HealthCare Corp. v. Symczyk, 569 U.S. 66 (2013); Sandifer v. United States Steel Corp., 571 U.S. 220 (2014); Integrity Staffing Solutions, Inc. v. Busk, 574 U.S. 27 (2014); Perez v. Mortgage Bankers Ass'n, No. 13-1041, 575 U.S. ___ (2015); Tyson Foods, Inc. v. Bouaphakeo, No. 14-1146, 577 U.S. ___ (2016); Encino Motorcars v. Navarro, No. 15-415, 579 U.S. ___ (2016); Encino Motorcars v. Navarro, No. 16-1362, 584 U.S. ___ (2018); Epic Systems Corp. v. Lewis, No. 16-285, 584 U.S. ___ (2018); Parker Drilling Management Services, Ltd. v. Newton, No. 18-389, 587 U.S. ___ (2019); Helix Energy Solutions Group, Inc. v. Hewitt, No. 21-984, 598 U.S. ___ (2023); E.M.D. Sales, Inc. v. Carrera, 604 U.S. 45 (2025)

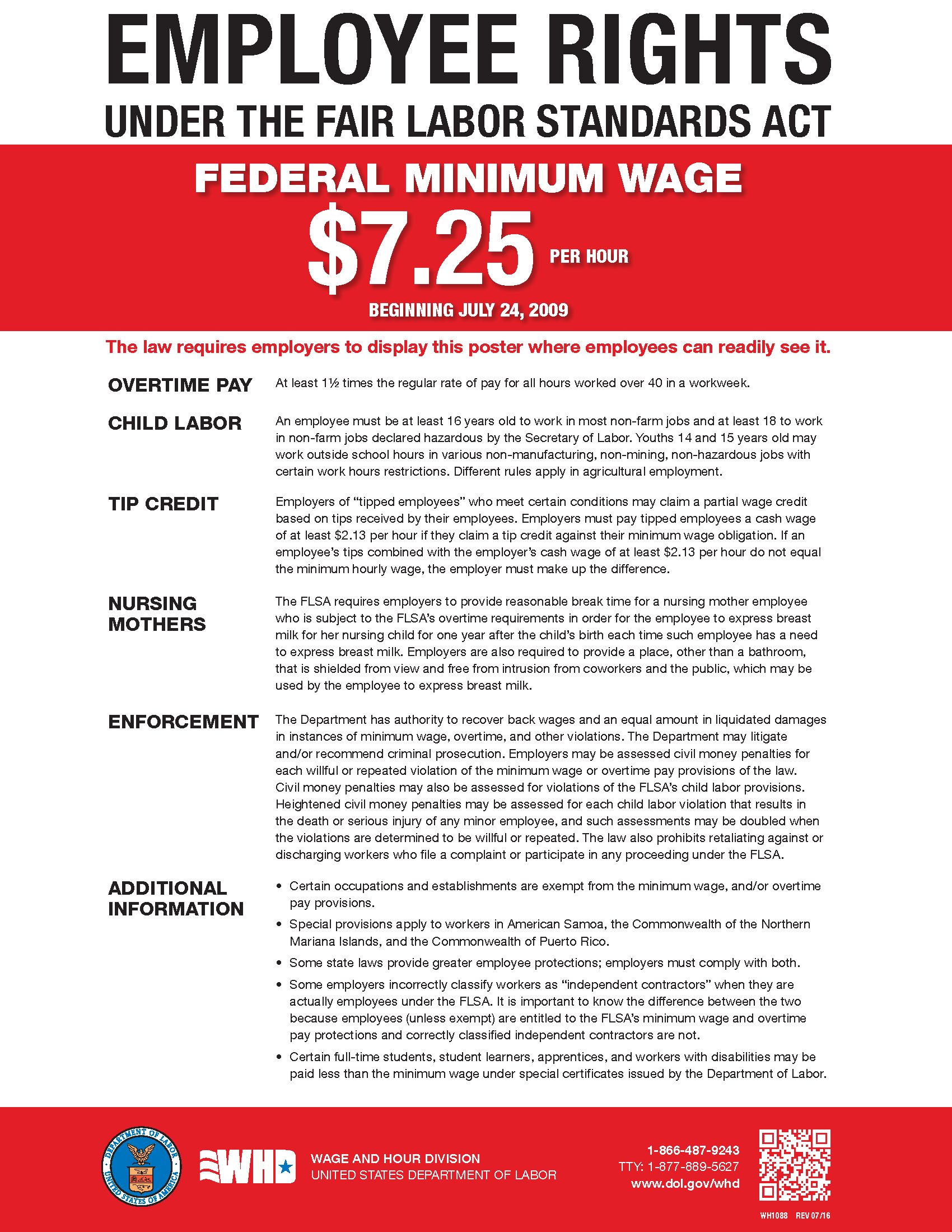
Department of Labor poster notifying employees of rights under the Fair Labor Standards Act

The Fair Labor Standards Act of 1938 (FLSA), 29 U.S.C. § 203, is a United States labor law that creates the right to a minimum wage, and "time-and-a-half" overtime pay when people work over forty hours a week. It also prohibits employment of minors in "oppressive child labor". It applies to employees engaged in interstate commerce or employed by an enterprise engaged in commerce or in the production of goods for commerce, unless the employer can claim an exemption from coverage. The Act was enacted by the 75th Congress and signed into law by President Franklin D. Roosevelt in 1938. The FLSA is considered the last legislation of the New Deal.

== Clauses of the Act ==
=== Minimum Wage ===
Since 2009, the Federal Minimum Wage has held steady at $7.25 per hour. However, depending on the state in which someone lives, the minimum wage can be higher to compensate for the cost of living in that area.

=== Child Labor ===
The Fair Labor Standards Act specifically states the ages at which someone is able to begin working. Generally, this is between the ages of 14 and 15. However, there are specific exemptions for people working in non-hazardous occupations such as the entertainment industry. In these cases, children are allowed to work at ages younger than fourteen with strict regulations regarding schooling and hour limits.

=== Overtime Pay ===
Overtime pay pertains to an increase in pay for every hour worked above the 40-hour full-time workload. This means that anyone who works more than 40 hours per workweek for a single employer is entitled to one and a half times their hourly pay for each hour worked above this limit. This provision applies solely to workers who are non-exempt under the language of the act.

=== Record Keeping ===
The Fair Labor Standards Act gives specific guidance on how long employers are required to maintain records on each of their employees. These records contain items like timesheets, overtime records, and other things specifically applicable to the employees.

== Practical application ==
The Fair Labor Standards Act applies to "employees who are engaged in interstate commerce or in the production of goods for commerce, or who are employed by an enterprise engaged in commerce or in the production of goods for commerce" unless the employer can claim an exemption from coverage. Generally, an employer with at least $500,000 of business or gross sales in a year satisfies the commerce requirements of the FLSA, and therefore that employer's workers are subject to the Fair Labor Standards Act's protections if no other exemption applies. Several exemptions exist that relieve an employer from having to meet the statutory minimum wage, overtime, and record-keeping requirements. The largest exceptions apply to the so-called "white collar" exemptions that are applicable to professional, administrative and executive employees, though exemptions also exist for jobs such as movie theater workers. Exemptions are narrowly construed, as an employer must prove that the employees fit "plainly and unmistakably" within the exemption's terms.

The Fair Labor Standards Act applies to "any individual employed by an employer" but not to independent contractors or volunteers because they are not considered "employees" under the FLSA. Still, an employer cannot simply exempt workers from the Fair Labor Standards Act by calling them independent contractors, and many employers have illegally and incorrectly classified their workers as independent contractors. Some employers similarly mislabel employees as volunteers. Courts look at the "economic reality" of the relationship between the putative employer and the worker to determine whether the worker is an independent contractor. Courts use a similar test to determine whether a worker was concurrently employed by more than one person or entity; commonly referred to as "joint employers". For example, a farm worker may be considered jointly employed by a labor contractor (who is in charge of recruitment, transportation, payroll, and keeping track of hours) and a grower (who generally monitors the quality of the work performed, determines where to place workers, controls the volume of work available, has quality control requirements, and has the power to fire, discipline, or provide work instructions to workers).

In many instances, employers do not pay overtime properly for non-exempt jobs, such as not paying an employee for travel time between job sites, activities before or after their shifts, and preparation central to work activities. If an employee is entitled to overtime, the employer must pay them one and a half times their "regular rate of pay" for all hours they work over 40 in the same work week.

Employees employed in a ministerial role by a religiously affiliated employer are not entitled to overtime under the act.

During World War II, the Army-Navy "E" Award for excellence in war production required maintaining the fair labor standards established under the Act.

=== Exemptions ===
The Fair Labor Standards Act sets minimum wage, overtime pay, recordkeeping, and child labor standards, but certain employees may be exempt. The exemptions include executive, administrative, professional, computer employee, and outside sales exemptions.

Exemptions are determined using multiple factors. However, one of the most prominent factors about whether or not an employee is exempt comes from how the specific employee is paid. If the employee is paid a salary, rather than an hourly compensation, that employee is exempt because their pay does not depend on the number of hours worked. Therefore, they can work above the 40-hour full-time limit, and still not receive overtime pay.

=== Tipping ===
Under the Fair Labor Standards Act, an employer has to pay each employee the minimum wage, unless the employee is "engaged in an occupation in which the employee customarily and regularly receives more than $30 a month in tips". If the employee's wage does not equal minimum wage, including tips, the employer must make up the difference. However, the employee must be allowed to keep all tips, either individually or through a tip pool. A tip pool may also contain only "employees who customarily and regularly receive tips". "The phrase 'customarily and regularly' signifies a frequency which must be greater than occasional, but which may be less than constant."

While the nomenclature of a job title is not dispositive, the job of "busboy" is explicitly validated for tip-pool inclusion by an authoritative source. "A busboy performs an integral part of customer service without much direct interaction, but he does so in a manner visible to customers. ... Thus, for a service bartender to be validly included in a tip pool, he must meet this minimal threshold in a manner sufficient to incentivize customers to 'customarily and regularly' tip in recognition" of his services (though he need not receive the tips directly).

== Legislative and administrative history ==
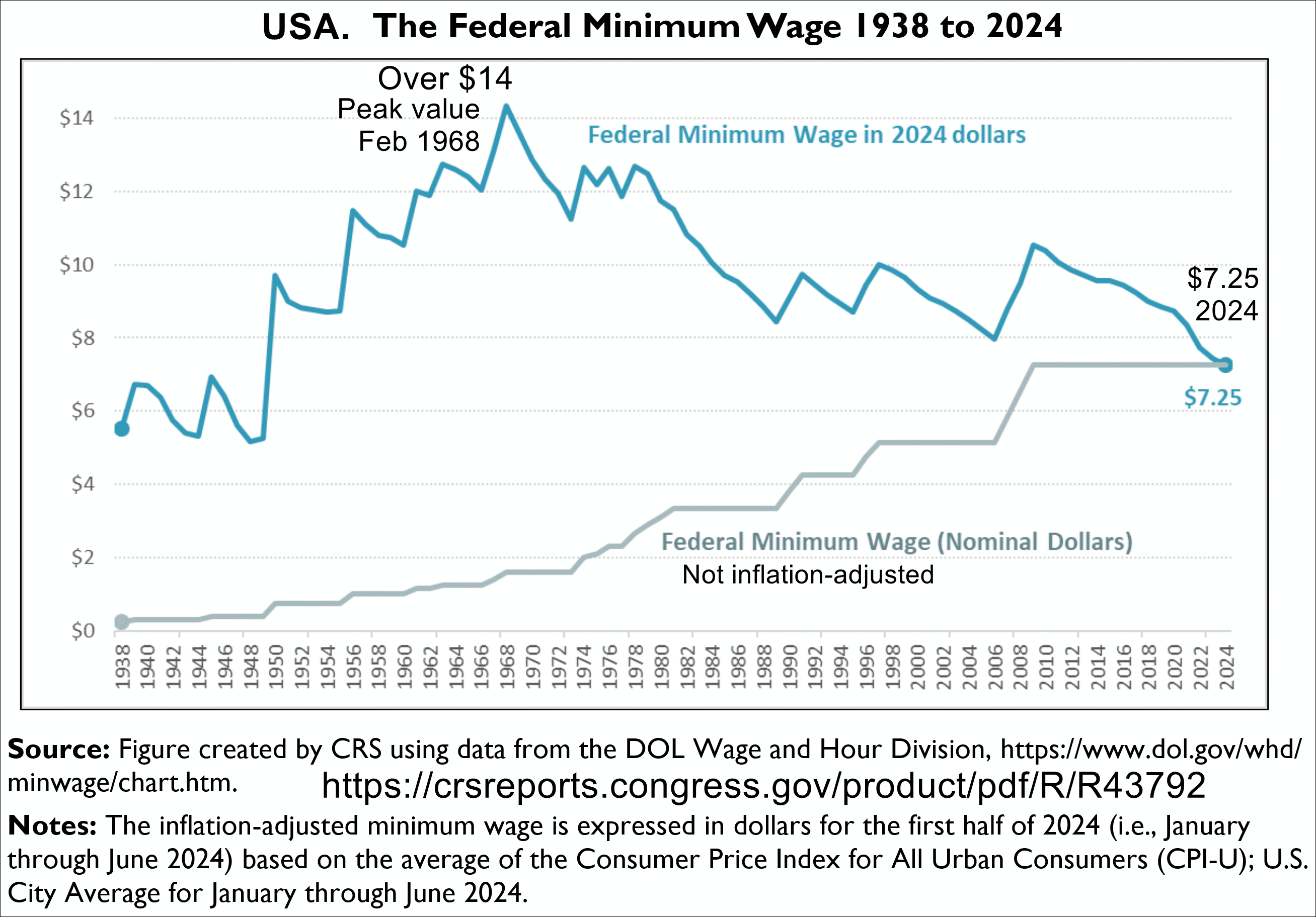
The real federal minimum wage has declined by 46% since February 1968. Lower line is nominal dollars. Top line is inflation-adjusted.

=== 1938 Fair Labor Standards Act ===
The Fair Labor Standards Act was originally drafted in 1932 by Senator Hugo Black, whose proposal to require employers to adopt a thirty-hour workweek met fierce resistance.

In 1938, a revised version of Black's proposal was passed. The revised version was instrumentally supported by a number of notable people, including Frances Perkins, Clara Mortenson Beyer from the Bureau of Labor Standards within the United States Department of Labor, as well as Congresswoman Mary T. Norton. The revised proposal adopted an eight-hour day and a forty-hour workweek and allowed workers to earn wage for an extra four hours of overtime as well. According to the act, workers must be paid minimum wage and overtime pay must be one-and-a-half times regular pay. Children under eighteen cannot do certain dangerous jobs, and children under sixteen cannot work in manufacturing or mining or during school hours. Though it did not cover executives, seasonal employees, and some other groups, the Fair Labor Standards Act gave raises to 700,000 workers, and US President Franklin Roosevelt called it the most important piece of New Deal legislation since the Social Security Act of 1935.

=== 1947 Portal-to-Portal Act ===
In 1946, the US Supreme Court ruled in Anderson v. Mt. Clemens Pottery Co. that preliminary work activities controlled by the employer and performed entirely for the employer's benefit are properly included as working time under the FLSA.

In response, Congress passed the 1947 Portal-to-Portal Act, which narrowed the Supreme Court's decision. It specified exactly what type of time was considered compensable work time. In general, as long as an employee is engaging in activities that benefit the employer, regardless of when they are performed, the employer has an obligation to pay the employee for that time. The act also specified that travel to and from the workplace was a normal incident of employment and should not be considered paid working time.

The act stated that employees had two years of performing the work to file a lawsuit for uncompensated time. Upon signing the act, President Harry Truman urged Congress to increase the minimum wage from 40 cents per hour to 65 cents per hour.

=== 1949 Fair Labor Standards Amendment ===
The full effect of the FLSA of 1938 was postponed by the wartime inflation of the 1940s, which increased (nominal) wages to above the level specified in the Act. On October 26, 1949, President Truman signed the Fair Labor Standards Amendment Act of 1949 (ch. 736, Pub. L. 81–393, 63 Stat. 910, 29 U.S.C. § 201).

The act defined an employee's "regular rate" of pay for purposes of computation of overtime pay. The act specified that employees were covered by the Fair Labor Standards Act if they are "directly essential" to production of goods for interstate commerce. The act increased the minimum wage from 40 cents to 75 cents per hour, effective January 24, 1950. The act prohibited oppressive child labor in commerce or in the production of goods for commerce. The act also included a few new exemptions for special worker classes.

=== 1955 amendment ===
In 1955, President Eisenhower urged Congress to amend the FLSA in order to increase the number of employees who are covered by minimum wage laws and to increase the minimum wage itself to 90 cents per hour. At the time, retail workers and services workers were not covered by minimum wage laws.

Congress passed an amendment to the FLSA, and President Eisenhower signed it on August 12, 1955. The amendment increased the minimum wage from 75¢ per hour to $1 per hour, effective March 1, 1956. Despite a push by some members of Congress, retail workers, service workers, agricultural workers, and construction workers were still not required to be paid at least the minimum wage.

=== 1961 amendment ===
The Fair Labor Standards Amendments of 1961 added another method of determining a type of coverage called enterprise coverage. Enterprise coverage applies only when the business is involved in interstate commerce and its gross annual business volume is a minimum of $500,000. All employees working for "enterprises" are then covered by the FLSA if the individual firms of the "enterprise have a revenue greater than $500,000 per year". Under the original 1938 Act, a worker whose work is in the channels of interstate commerce is covered as an individual. "Interstate commerce" is interpreted so broadly that most work is included, such as ordering, loading, or using supplies from out of state, accepting payments from customers based on credit cards issued by out-of-state banks, and so on.

The 1961 amendment also specified that coverage is automatic for schools, hospitals, nursing homes, or other residential care facilities. Coverage is also automatic for all governmental entities at whatever level of government, no matter the size. Coverage does not apply to certain entities not organized for business, such as churches and charitable institutions. The minimum wage level was increased to $1.25 per hour. What could be considered a wage was specifically defined, and entitlement to sue for back wages was granted.

=== 1963 Equal Pay Act ===
The Equal Pay Act of 1963 was enacted to amend the FLSA and make it illegal to pay some workers lower wages than others strictly on the basis on their sex. It is often summed up with the phrase "equal pay for equal work". The Equal Pay Act allows unequal pay for equal work only when the employer sets wages pursuant to a seniority system, a merit system, a system that measures earnings by quantity or quality of production, or other factors outside of sex. For the first nine years of the EPA, the requirement of equal pay for equal work did not extend to persons employed in an executive, administrative or professional capacity, or as an outside salesperson. Therefore, the EPA exempted white-collar women from the protection of equal pay for equal work. In 1972, Congress enacted the Education Amendments of 1972, which amended the FLSA to expand the coverage of the EPA to these employees, by excluding the EPA from the professional workers exemption of the FLSA.

=== 1966 amendment ===
The 1966 amendment expanded coverage to some farm workers and increased the minimum wage to $1.60 per hour in stages. The 1966 Fair Labor Standards Act amendment also gave federal employees coverage for the first time.

A 2021 study on the effects of the 1966 extension, which raised the minimum wage in several economic sectors, found that the minimum wages increases led to a sharp increase in earnings without any adverse aggregate effects on employment. The legislation also substantially reduced the racial wage gap.

=== 1967 Age Discrimination in Employment Act ===
The Age Discrimination in Employment Act of 1967 (ADEA) prohibited employment discrimination against persons forty years of age or older. Some older workers were being denied health benefits based on their age and denied training opportunities prior to the passage of the ADEA. The act applies only to businesses employing more than twenty workers.

=== 1974 Fair Labor Standards Amendments ===
The 1974 amendment expanded coverage to include other state and local government employees that were not previously covered. Domestic workers also became covered and the minimum wage was increased to $2.30 per hour in stages.

=== 1977 Fair Labor Standards Amendments ===
The 1977 amendment increased the minimum wage in yearly increments through 1981 to $3.35 an hour. Changes were made involving tipped employees and the tip credit. Partial overtime exemption was repealed in stages for certain hotel, motel, and restaurant employees.

=== 1983 Migrant and Seasonal Agricultural Worker Protection Act ===
The Migrant and Seasonal Agricultural Worker Protection Act (MSPA), enacted in 1983, was designed to provide migrant and seasonal farm workers with protections concerning pay, working conditions, and work-related conditions to require farm labor contractors to register with the US Department of Labor and assure necessary protections for farm workers, agricultural associations, and agricultural employers.

=== 1985 Fair Labor Standards Amendments ===
An amendment permitted state and local government employers to compensate their employees' overtime hours with paid time away from work in lieu of overtime pay. Paid time off must be given at the rate of one and one-half hours for each hour of employment for which overtime compensation would be required by the Fair Labor Standards Act. Other employers may not compensate employees with paid time off in lieu of overtime pay.

The amendment exempted state and local governments from paying overtime for special detail work performed by fire-protection, law-enforcement, and prison-security employees. The amendment exempted state and local governments from paying overtime to employees working in a substantially different capacity from the employee's regular full-time employment on a sporadic basis.

The amendment stated that individuals who volunteer to perform services for a state or local government agency are not covered by the Fair Labor Standards Act if the individual receives no compensation or nominal compensation.

The amendment stated that state and local legislative employees, other than legislative library employees, are not covered by the Fair Labor Standards Act.

=== 1986 Amendment ===
In 1986, the Fair Labor Standards Act was amended to allow the United States Secretary of Labor to provide special certificates to allow an employer to pay less than the minimum wage to individuals whose earning or productive capacity is impaired by age, physical or mental deficiency, or injury. These employees must still be paid wages that are related to the individual's productivity and commensurate with those paid to similarly located and employed nonhandicapped workers. However, paying workers with disabilities less than the minimum wage was outlawed in Vermont in 2002, New Hampshire in 2015, in Maryland in 2016, and in Alaska in 2018.

==== Section 14(c) ====
Section 14(c) of the Fair Labor Standards Act states that with the approval of the Department of Labor's Wage and Hour Division (WHD) certain employers can pay employees with disabilities below the minimum wage. In order for the subminimum wage to apply, the disability of the worker must directly affect their productivity in their given position. The employer must show that the work of an employee with a disability is less productive than the standard set for employees without disabilities. If approved by the WHD, the rate of pay for the worker with a disability can correlate to their productivity in comparison to workers without disabilities. Every sixth months at a minimum, employers certified under Section 14(c) must review the special minimum wage of their hourly employees. Annually, Section 14(c) employers must also adjust the rate of pay workers receiving special minimum wages to remain comparable to that of employees without disabilities. These requirements of subminimum wage review by the employers were added to Section 14(c) through a 1986 amendment. The intention of the section is to enable higher employment for people with disabilities. The concern with enforcing minimum wage was that there would be a decrease in the job opportunities for workers with disabilities, so Section 14(c) is to be utilized only as needed to offset any opportunity loss.

The majority of Section 14(c) workers are employed through work centers, but these individuals also work through businesses, schools, and hospitals. As of 2024, there were 733 employers nationwide with issued certificates and 47 pending certificates employing 39,499 individuals with disabilities. More than 50% of workers with disabilities were paid $2.50 per hour or less by their employers due to reduced productivity caused by a disability. There are several proposed bills that would repeal and eventually phase out Section 14(c) certifications such as H.R. 873 or H.R. 582 (Raise the Wage Act) which was passed by the House of Representatives in July 2019, but did not pass. Both political parties have expressed support to repealing this program. In 2025, the proposed regulation will again go before Congress for a vote.

=== 1986 Department of Defense Authorization Act ===
The Department of Defense Authorization Act of 1986 repealed the eight-hour daily overtime requirements on all federal contracts.

=== 1989 Fair Labor Standards Amendments ===
In 1989, Senator Edward M. Kennedy introduced a bill to increase the minimum wage from $3.35 per hour to $4.55 per hour in stages. Secretary of Labor Elizabeth Dole supported increasing the minimum wage to $4.25 per hour along with allowing a minimum wage of $3.35 an hour for new employees' first ninety days of employment for an employer. Secretary Dole said that President George H. W. Bush would veto any bill increasing the minimum wage to more than $4.25 per hour.

By a vote of 248 to 171, the House of Representatives approved a bill to increase the minimum wage to $4.55 per hour in stages over a two-year period. The bill also allowed employers to pay new employees at least 85 percent of the minimum wage during the first sixty days of employment of a newly hired employee with no previous employment. The bill also increased the exemption from minimum wage law for small businesses from $362,500 to $500,000 of annual sales. By a vote of 61 to 39, the Senate approved a bill to increase the minimum wage to $4.55 per hour. President Bush vetoed the bill, calling the increase "excessive". The House of Representatives unsuccessfully tried to override the veto, voting 247 to 178 to override, 37 votes short.

By a vote of 382 to 37, the House of Representatives approved a revised bill that would increase the minimum wage to $3.80 per hour as of April 1990, and $4.25 per hour as of April 1, 1991. The bill would allow a lower minimum wage for employees who are less than twenty years old. The bill eliminated different minimum wages for retail and non-retail businesses. The next week, the Senate approved the bill by a vote of 89 to 8. Senators Orrin Hatch, Steve Symms, and Phil Gramm were unsuccessful at passing minimum-wage exemptions for small businesses and farmers using migrant or seasonal workers. President Bush signed the bill two weeks later.

=== 1990 Amendment ===
While computer science was a relatively new field, it was argued since the 1960s that technical specialists in the computer services field, carefully defined, ought to be regarded as "professional" and, thus, exempt from the overtime pay protections of the FLSA. In 1990 legislation classified computer workers as professionals if their hourly pay was “at least 6½ times greater than the applicable minimum wage.”

=== 1996 Small Business Job Protection Act ===
The 1996 amendment increased the minimum wage to $5.15 an hour. However, the Small Business Job Protection Act of 1996 (PL 104-188), which provided the minimum-wage increase, also detached tipped employees from future minimum-wage increases.

=== 2004 rule change ===
On August 23, 2004, controversial changes to exemptions from the FLSA's minimum wage and overtime requirements went into effect, making substantial modifications to the definition of an "exempt" employee. Low-level working supervisors throughout American industries were reclassified as "executives" and lost overtime rights. The changes were sought by business interests, which claimed that the laws needed clarification and that few workers would be affected. The Bush administration called the new regulations "FairPay". However, other organizations, such as the AFL–CIO, claimed the changes would make millions of additional workers ineligible to obtain relief under the FLSA for overtime pay. Attempts in Congress to overturn the new regulations were unsuccessful.

Conversely, some low-level employees (particularly administrative-support staff) that had previously been classified as exempt were now reclassified as non-exempt. Although such employees work in positions bearing titles previously used to determine exempt status (such as "executive assistant"), the 2004 amendment to the FLSA now requires that an exemption must be predicated upon actual job function and not job title. Employees with job titles that previously allowed exemption but whose job descriptions did not include managerial functions were now reclassified from exempt to non-exempt.

=== 2007 Fair Minimum Wage Act ===
On May 25, 2007, President Bush signed into law a supplemental appropriation bill (H.R. 2206), which contains the Fair Minimum Wage Act of 2007. This provision amended the FLSA to provide for the increase of the federal minimum wage by an incremental plan, culminating in a minimum wage of $7.25 per hour by July 24, 2009. Further, American territories including American Samoa and Puerto Rico were to adopt the mainland minimum wage in a series of incremental increases.

=== 2010 Patient Protection and Affordable Care Act ===
Section 4207 of the Patient Protection and Affordable Care Act (H.R. 3590) amends Section 7 to add a "break time for nursing mothers" provision. It specifies that employers shall provide break time for nursing mothers to express milk and that "a place, other than a bathroom, that is shielded from view and free from intrusion from coworkers and the public" should be available for employees to express milk.

=== 2019 rule change ===
On September 27, 2019, the Department of Labor released a rule setting the salary level or amount test at $684 per week (equivalent to $35,568 per year) in order for an employee to qualify as an FLSA-exempt executive employee, administrative employee, and professional employee. In order to qualify as a highly compensated employee, the total annual compensation test was set at $107,432. When the Department of Labor had determined the total annual compensation, it based it on the eightieth percentile of weekly earnings for full-time salaried employees in the United States.

=== Proposed amendments ===
==== 2009/2013 Paid Vacation Act ====
The Paid Vacation Act of 2009, introduced by Representative Alan Grayson on May 21, 2009, proposed that all employers with 100 or more employees provide a paid vacation to all eligible personnel. This earned period of time was initially defined as seven working days and increased to fourteen working days three years after the bill passed. Additionally, employers with 50 or more personnel would have been required to provide one working week of paid vacation. This vacation period was to be used within a twelve-month period. In addition to these stipulations, the bill authorized a public awareness campaign to be overseen by the Secretary of Labor and required a study be conducted on the effect of the paid vacation time in the workplace. On May 21, 2009, the bill was referred to the House Committee on Education and Labor and two months later referred to the Subcommittee on Workforce Protections. The bill remained in the subcommittee with no report or recommendation issued. At the time of proposal, H.R. 2563 had two original cosponsors; two additional cosponsors added July 2009.

In 2013, Representative Grayson reintroduced the Paid Vacation Act as H.R. 2096. Apart from the omission of the 2009 proposal's findings section, H.R. 2096 was virtually identical to H.R. 2563. Representative Grayson was the sole original sponsor for the bill, which was immediately referred to the House Committee on Education and Labor. Like the original proposition, the bill was referred to the House Subcommittee on Workforce Protections in July 2013. There have been no reports issued by either the committee or subcommittee. Both bills were met with opposition which cited concerns of the loss of jobs or benefits.

==== 2014 Minimum Wage Fairness Act ====
In April 2014, the United States Senate debated the Minimum Wage Fairness Act (S. 1737; 113th Congress). The bill would have amended the Fair Labor Standards Act of 1938 (FLSA) to increase the federal minimum wage for employees to $10.10 per hour over the course of a two-year period. The bill was strongly supported by President Barack Obama and many of the Democratic senators, but strongly opposed by Republicans in the Senate and House.

==== 2015 Healthy Families Act ====
In January 2015, President Barack Obama asked Congress to pass the Healthy Families Act under which employers would be allowed to give employees one hour of paid sick leave for every 30 hours they work up. This applies for up to seven days or 56 hours of paid sick leave annually instead of paying overtime to the employees. The bill, as proposed, would have applied to employers with 15 or more employees for employees as defined in the Fair Labor Standards Act.

==== 2015 proposed rulemaking ====
On July 6, 2015, the Department of Labor published a Notice of Proposed Rulemaking, based on a 2014 presidential memorandum signed by President Barack Obama directing the Department of Labor to update the regulations defining which white-collar workers are protected by the FLSA's minimum wage and overtime standards. On May 18, 2016, the final version of the rule was published, which would require that employees earning a salary of less than $913 per week would be paid overtime, effective December 1, 2016, and the threshold would be automatically adjusted every three years, beginning January 1, 2020.

On November 23, 2016, a United States District judge imposed an injunction, temporarily stopping the rule's enforcement nationwide, in order to have time to determine whether the Department of Labor had the authority to issue the regulation. When the Trump administration took power in January 2017 they opted not to defend the rule in court, leading to a summary judgement on August 31 that the rule was invalid because the threshold was so high that it made the duties test irrelevant, and because the automatic adjustments provided by the rule were unlawful.

==== 2016 Wage Theft Prevention and Wage Recovery Act ====
In September 2016, Democratic members of the United States House and Senate introduced the Wage Theft Prevention and Wage Recovery Act. It would have increased employer liability under FLSA suits to the amount promised by the employer, rather than the minimum wage, prohibit pre-dispute arbitration agreements from precluding a claim of wage theft from court, make it possible to bring FLSA class action suits without the individual consent of workers who had their wages stolen, create automatic financial penalties for violations and create a discretionary ability for the Department of Labor to refer the violators to the Department of Justice for prosecution. The bill did not make it out of committee in either the House or the Senate.

== See also ==
- United States labor law
- Timeline of children's rights in the United States
- Frank Murphy
- Second Bill of Rights
- Employment discrimination law in the United States
- Tennessee Coal, Iron & Railroad Co. v. Muscoda Local No. 123
- Garcia v. San Antonio Metropolitan Transit Authority
- Living wage
- Minimum wage in the United States
- List of U.S. minimum wages
- Maximum wage
- Wage slave
- Blue law
