= Energy Reserves Group, Inc. v. Kansas Power & Light Co. =

- Supreme Court of the United States

Argued November 9, 1982 Decided January 24, 1983
- Full case name: Energy Reserves Group, Inc. v. Kansas Power & Light Co.
- Citations: 459 U.S. 400 (more)

Court membership
- Chief Justice Warren E. Burger Associate Justices William J. Brennan Jr. · Byron White; Thurgood Marshall · Harry Blackmun; Lewis F. Powell Jr. · William Rehnquist; John P. Stevens · Sandra Day O'Connor

Case opinions
- Majority: Blackmun, joined by Brennan, White, Marshall, Stevens, O'Connor
- Concurrence: Powell, joined by Burger, Rehnquist

Laws applied
- Contract Clause

Energy Reserves Group, Inc. v. Kansas Power & Light Co., 459 U.S. 400 (1983), is a U.S. Supreme Court decision interpreting the Contract Clause of the U.S. Constitution. The Court upheld the Kansas Natural Gas Price Protection Act, finding that it did not unconstitutionally interfere with existing private contracts.

The case arose when Energy Reserves Group, Inc. challenged the Kansas law. Energy Reserves Group’s predecessor had previously entered into two intrastate gas contracts with Kansas Power & Light Co., both of which included price escalator clauses. After the Federal Natural Gas Policy Act of 1978 was passed to promote the deregulation of natural gas, the state of Kansas passed a law that restricted price increases in contracts.

Kansas Power & Light followed the state law, refusing to pay higher prices. Energy Reserves Group argued that the law violated the Contract Clause by interfering with contract pricing terms. The Supreme Court disagreed, finding that Kansas had a legitimate interest in protecting consumers from price hikes. The Court made clear that the Contract Clause does not ban all state involvement in private contracts.

== Background ==
=== History of natural gas pricing in the United States ===
Natural gas pricing in the United States has been shaped by federal regulatory policies affecting both pipelines and producers. As pipeline technology improved in the 1920s with high-tensile steel and electric welding, it became easier and cheaper to transport gas over long distances. This gave pipeline companies monopsony power because they were often the only buyers of gas in certain regions. In response, Congress passed the Natural Gas Act of 1938, which regulated interstate pipelines as utilities. However, this still allowed pipelines to preserve their power because they weren’t required to transport gas for all independent producers.

Then, in 1954, the Supreme Court’s decision in Phillips Petroleum Co. v. Wisconsin required the Federal Power Commission (FPC) to regulate the prices producers could charge at wellheads. The FPC struggled to implement this mandate and faced a backlog of pending cases. Inconsistent price regulations discouraged production and eventually led to natural gas shortages. By 1973, the U.S. had grown more reliant on imported oil, but was then faced with the OAPEC oil embargo. In response to these events, Congress passed the Natural Gas Policy Act of 1978, which aimed to balance supply and demand. This included gradually deregulating wellhead prices by introducing a system of price ceilings for different gas categories.

==== Natural Gas Policy Act of 1978 ====
The Natural Gas Policy Act of 1978 (NGPA) categorized natural gas into different categories. Section 102 of the Act established ceiling prices for new natural gas, defined as gas produced from wells not previously committed to interstate commerce and either newly drilled or newly placed into commercial production after April 20, 1977. The ceiling price under this section began at $1.75 per million British thermal units (MMBtu) and increased monthly based on an inflation adjustment factor. By December 1978, the ceiling price under Section 102 had risen to $2.078 per MMBtu. Section 104 applied to old interstate gas and Section 109 applied to all other gas not classified as new or old. The December 1978 ceiling price under Section 109 was set at $1.63 per MMBtu.

Additionally, Section 105 distinguished the NGPA from prior law as it extended the price regulations to gas sold in the intrastate market. It established that gas not committed to interstate commerce would be subjected to the price listed in its contract or the federal price ceiling defined in Section 102, whichever is lower. Finally, Section 602(a) asserted that states can set price ceilings for gas produced within the state if the price ceilings don’t exceed the federal maximum.

=== History of the case ===
On September 27, 1975, Kansas Power & Light Co. (KPL) entered into two contracts with Clinton Oil Co., later acquired by Energy Reserves Group, Inc. (ERG). The first contract involved KPL purchasing unprocessed natural gas directly from a wellhead in southern Kansas operated by ERG. The second contract covered the purchase of residue, or processed, gas from the same field. The contracts defined the purchase price in relation to a governmental price escalator clause and a price redetermination clause. The governmental price escalator clause allowed the contract price to rise if federal price ceilings were increased, while the price redetermination clause allowed the parties to renegotiate the price at specified times.

Under the contracts, if ERG used either the governmental price escalator or the price redetermination clause, KPL had to get approval from the Kansas Corporation Commission to pass the price increase on to consumers. If the Commission denied the request or KPL chose not to file, ERG could terminate the contracts. In November 1978, ERG requested a price increase to match the price ceiling set in Section 102 of the NGPA.

In May 1979, Kansas enacted the Kansas Natural Gas Price Protection Act, in response to the NGPA, to minimize the impact of natural gas price increases on consumers. On June 5, 1979, ERG notified KPL of its intent to terminate the contracts after KPL failed to submit the required application on time. KPL objected, arguing that the Kansas Act barred the price increase ERG was seeking under the governmental price escalator clause. ERG then sought the same increase under the price redetermination clause, but KPL again refused, claiming it was not obligated to comply under the Kansas law. Section 55-1404 of the Act specifically prohibits the use of federal ceiling prices or other contract prices in applying such clauses in contracts made prior to April 20, 1977.

== Argument ==
ERG argued that KPL breached the contracts by refusing to pay the increased price under Section 102 of the NGPA. ERG claimed that the price escalator clauses in the contracts were triggered by the federal ceiling price increase established by that section. The company further argued that Kansas’s effort to limit price increases, specifically through Sections 55-1404 and 55-1405 of the Kansas Natural Gas Price Protection Act, violated the Contract Clause of the U.S. Constitution. According to ERG, these provisions weakened the effect of the price escalator clauses by restricting the price increases. Both parties filed cross-motions for summary judgment to the Kansas trial court.

== Decision ==
=== Lower court's rulings ===
The Kansas trial court held that the NGPA’s ceiling prices did not trigger the governmental price escalator clauses in the contracts. The court also ruled that the Kansas Act did not violate the Contract Clause of the U.S. Constitution. The Kansas Supreme Court unanimously affirmed the decision. The U.S. Supreme Court noted probable jurisdiction in Energy Reserves Group, Inc. v. Kansas Power & Light Co., 456 U.S. 904 (1982), agreeing to hear the appeal from the state court.

=== Supreme Court decision ===
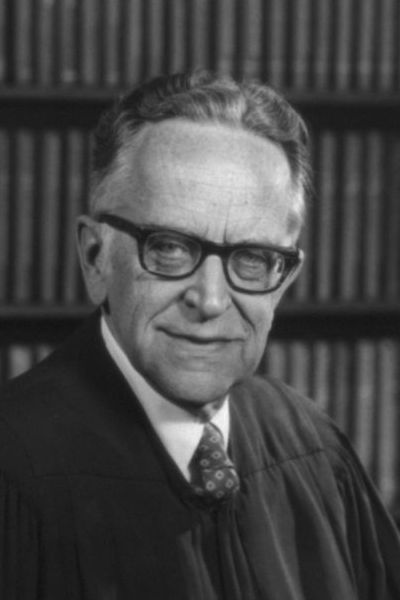
Justice Harry Blackmun authored the majority opinion.

Justice Harry Blackmun authored the majority opinion of the Court. The Court upheld the Kansas law and affirmed the lower court’s decision. Applying a three-part test, the Court acknowledged that the law interfered with the contracts but held that the impairment was not substantial, served a legitimate public purpose, and was reasonably tailored. This test was developed in earlier Contract Clause decisions, such as United States Trust Co. v. New Jersey and Allied Structural Steel Co. v. Spannaus.

==== Three-part test ====
Under the three-part test, the Court first analyzed whether the Kansas law caused a substantial impairment of the contracts. This first step, developed in Allied Structural Steel Co. v. Spannaus, examines how much the law interferes with the contractual relationship of the parties. In applying this step, Justice Blackmun explained that the Court also considers the history of regulation in the industry to determine whether the parties should have anticipated potential changes. In this case, the Court found that KPL operated in a heavily regulated industry as a public utility. Because of this, the Court concluded that ERG should have reasonably expected further price regulations. The Kansas law only limited potential profits and did not cause a substantial impairment.

Although this ruling was enough to resolve the case, Justice Blackmun went on to analyze the second and third steps of the test to show how they apply when a law is found to substantially impair a contract. Some suggest this was done to clarify the confusion caused by the United States Trust Co. v. New Jersey and Allied Structural Steel Co. v. Spannaus decisions.

The second step of the test analyzes whether the state has a legitimate public purpose in enacting a law that limits existing contracts. This step focuses on the idea that states can use their police power to benefit the public. The Court found that Kansas had a legitimate public interest in protecting consumers from rising natural gas prices and in attempting to stabilize both the interstate and intrastate gas markets.

The third step of the test then analyzes whether the law was applied in a reasonable way to achieve its purpose. Justice Blackmun explained that the law must be based on reasonable conditions and be closely connected to its goal. Justice Blackmun also explained that when the state isn’t a party to the contract, the Court usually agrees with the legislature’s judgment. Since the state of Kansas was not a party in this case, the Court gave more weight to the state’s law and found the law to be reasonable.

==== Concurrence ====
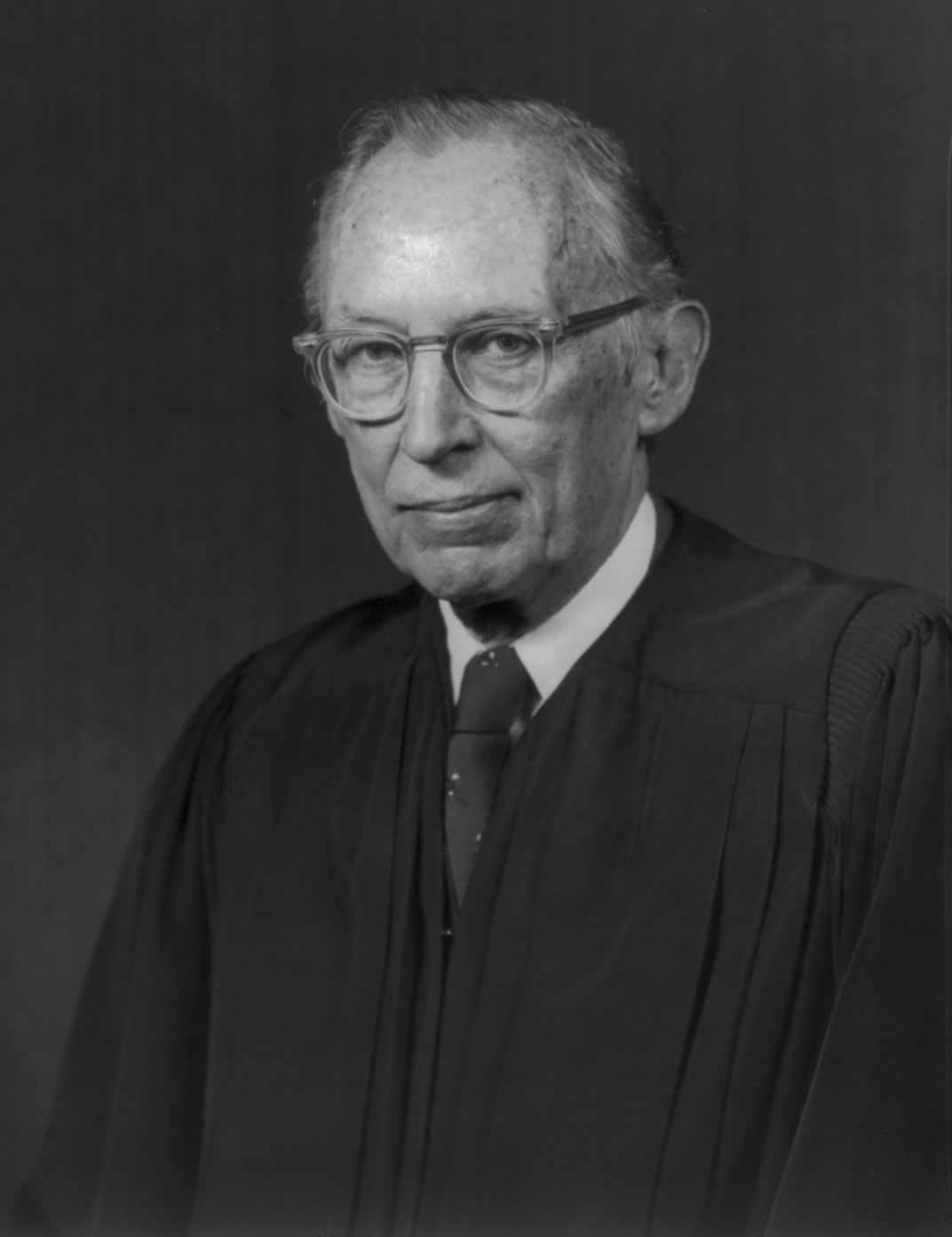
Justice Lewis F. Powell Jr. provided a concurrence to the decision.

Justice Lewis F. Powell Jr. provided a concurrence to the decision, joined by Chief Justice Burger and Justice Rehnquist. Justice Powell agreed with the Court’s decision but declined to join Part II-C of the opinion, which defines the second and third steps of the three-part test. Justice Powell felt that the case was already resolved when the Court found no substantial impairment of the contracts. Since that conclusion was enough to decide the case, he believed there was no need to further analyze the other steps, as stated below:

I do not necessarily disagree with this conclusion, particularly in the context of the pervasive regulation of public utilities. I decline to join Part II-C, however, because it addresses a substantial question and our discussion of the separate issue in Part II-B disposes of this case.

== Significance ==
The Supreme Court’s decision clarified how the Contract Clause applies to state laws that affect private contracts. The Court upheld Kansas’s law regulating natural gas prices, finding that it did not cause a substantial impairment to the contracts. Kansas was one of several states, including New Mexico and Oklahoma, that enacted laws in response to rising energy prices. The ruling directly affected a related case in Oklahoma involving higher financial stakes, which was ultimately withdrawn following the Court’s decision in Energy Reserves Group v. Kansas Power & Light Co.

This case has since been cited in later decisions involving similar contract disputes, whether between private companies or individuals, where state interference was at issue. Examples include Exxon Corp. v. Eagerton and Sveen v. Melin. Although later cases referred to this ruling, they applied the Contract Clause analysis differently, just as this case itself diverged from earlier precedents. Ultimately, Energy Reserves Group v. Kansas Power & Light Co. is viewed as part of a limited revival of the Contract Clause as U.S. legislation increasingly relies on other legal doctrines.
