= China Agritech, Inc. v. Resh =

- Supreme Court of the United States

Argued March 26, 2018 Decided June 11, 2018
- Full case name: China Agritech, Inc. v. Michael H. Resh, et al.
- Docket no.: 17-432
- Citations: 584 U.S. ___ (more) 138 S. Ct. 1800; 201 L. Ed. 2d 123

Case history
- Prior: Resh v. China Agritech, Inc., No. 14-cv-05083, 2014 WL 12599849 (C.D. Cal. Dec. 1, 2014); reversed, 857 F.3d 994 (9th Cir. 2017); cert. granted, 138 S. Ct. 543 (2017).

Holding
- Upon denial of class certification, a putative class member may not, in lieu of promptly joining an existing suit or promptly filing an individual action, commence a class action anew beyond the time allowed by the applicable statute of limitations.

Court membership
- Chief Justice John Roberts Associate Justices Anthony Kennedy · Clarence Thomas; Ruth Bader Ginsburg · Stephen Breyer; Samuel Alito · Sonia Sotomayor; Elena Kagan · Neil Gorsuch

Case opinions
- Majority: Ginsburg, joined by Roberts, Kennedy, Thomas, Breyer, Alito, Kagan, Gorsuch
- Concurrence: Sotomayor (in judgment)

China Agritech, Inc. v. Resh, 584 U.S. ___ (2018), was a case decided by the Supreme Court of the United States, holding that upon denial of class certification, a putative class member may not, in lieu of promptly joining an existing suit or promptly filing an individual action, commence a class action anew beyond the time allowed by the applicable statute of limitations.

== Facts ==
China Agritech is incorporated in Delaware and operates primarily in Beijing, China. According to the company, it manufactures and sells various agricultural products to Chinese farmers. China Agritech shares were first listed on NASDAQ in 2005. Four years later, in 2009, China Agritech reported a threefold increase in net revenue. NASDAQ initiated delisting proceedings against China Agritech's stock in 2011 after the company's shareholders made allegations of fraudulent business practices.

The company's shareholders filed two successive class action lawsuits in 2011 and 2012, but were denied class certification in both cases. Michael Resh, a shareholder, brought a third class action in 2014.

== Procedural history ==
China Agritech moved to dismiss Resh's complaint because the two year limitations period set by the Securities Exchange Act of 1934 had already passed. The district court granted China Agritech's motion to dismiss. According to the District Court, under the Supreme Court's prior case, American Pipe & Construction v. Utah, individual claims against the company were tolled during the two class actions filed in 2011 and 2012, but the American Pipe did not reach the issue of whether the tolling rule also applied to a new class action based on a "substantially identical" class. The Ninth Circuit reversed the district court, holding that a class action was not time-barred in cases where the plaintiff's were unnamed in the prior lawsuits, even if the complaint was made against many of the same defendants, and based upon the same events.

== Supreme Court ==
In an opinion written by Justice Ruth Bader Ginsburg, the Supreme Court reversed, holding that upon denial of class certification, a plaintiff cannot commence a class action anew beyond the time allowed by the applicable statute of limitations, and must promptly join an existing suit or file an individual action.
