= McCoy v. Louisiana =

- Supreme Court of the United States

Argued January 17, 2018 Decided May 14, 2018
- Full case name: McCoy v. Louisiana
- Docket no.: 16-8255
- Citations: 584 U.S. 414 (more) 138 S. Ct. 1500; 200 L. Ed. 2d 821

Case history
- Prior: State v. McCoy, 218 So. 3d 535 (La. 2016); cert. granted, 138 S. Ct. 53 (2017).
- Subsequent: On remand, 251 So. 3d 399 (La. 2018).

Holding
- The Sixth Amendment guarantees a defendant the right to choose the objective of his defense and to insist that his counsel refrain from admitting guilt, even when counsel's experienced-based view is that confessing guilt offers the defendant the best chance to avoid the death penalty.

Court membership
- Chief Justice John Roberts Associate Justices Anthony Kennedy · Clarence Thomas; Ruth Bader Ginsburg · Stephen Breyer; Samuel Alito · Sonia Sotomayor; Elena Kagan · Neil Gorsuch

Case opinions
- Majority: Ginsburg, joined by Roberts, Kennedy, Breyer, Sotomayor, Kagan
- Dissent: Alito, joined by Thomas, Gorsuch

McCoy v. Louisiana, 584 U.S. 414 (2018), was a United States Supreme Court case in which the Court held the Sixth Amendment guarantees a defendant the right to decide that the objective of his defense is to maintain innocence at all costs, even when counsel believes that admitting guilt offers the defendant the best chance to avoid the death penalty.

== Background ==
In 2008, Louisiana resident Robert McCoy was charged with the murder of his estranged wife's son, mother, and step-father; the prosecution sought the death penalty. He was initially appointed counsel from the public defender's office, but intractable disagreements arose, and he discharged his public defender. McCoy's parents hired a new lawyer, Larry English.

As McCoy was charged with a capital offense, his trial was divided into two phases: a "guilt phase" to determine if McCoy was guilty of the crime, and a "penalty phase" to determine the sentencing. English believed the evidence against McCoy was overwhelming and saw no hope of winning an acquittal. Instead, English formulated a trial strategy based on conceding at the guilt phase that McCoy was the killer in the hope of avoiding a death sentence at the penalty phase. When English explained this strategy to McCoy, he protested, insisting he was innocent of the crime and seeking to have English removed as his counsel. With only two days before trial was set to begin, the presiding judge refused. English proceeded with his strategy, telling the jury there was no way they could conclude that McCoy was innocent based on the evidence at trial. McCoy testified in his own defense, presenting a complex alibi involving an interstate police conspiracy to frame him. The jury convicted him of all three homicides. The victims were Gregory Colston, 17, Christine Young, 55 and Willie Young, 50, all of whom were killed on May 5, 2008.

During the penalty phase, English argued that the jury should have mercy on McCoy in light of his "serious mental and emotional issues." The jury reached a death verdict on each count.

McCoy appealed to the Louisiana Supreme Court, arguing that the trial court should not have allowed English to concede over McCoy's objections. The court ruled against McCoy, relying on the U.S. Supreme Court's decision in Florida v. Nixon, which determined that a lawyer could concede the defendant's guilt where the defendant neither expressly objected to nor opposed making such a concession.

== Opinion of the Court ==
On May 14, 2018, the Supreme Court announced judgment in favor of the accused, reversing the state court by a vote of 6-3. The Court held that the Sixth Amendment to the United States Constitution guarantees a defendant the right to choose the objective of the defense. The majority opinion was written by Justice Ruth Bader Ginsburg and joined by Chief Justice John Roberts and Justices Anthony Kennedy, Stephen Breyer, Sonia Sotomayor, and Elena Kagan.

The Court grounded its decision in the right of self-representation recognized in Faretta v. California. Even when a defendant chooses to be represented by counsel, the Court reasoned, he does not entirely surrender his right to control his own defense; rather, he retains the right to make certain fundamental decisions, like whether to plead guilty and whether to testify. The choice about which McCoy and English disagreed—whether to concede guilt in the hope of avoiding a death sentence, or to maintain innocence at all costs—was one only the defendant may make.

The Court declined to apply its ineffective-assistance-of-counsel framework, reasoning that McCoy's complaint was not about English's competence but rather about the trial court's ruling that English could proceed with his trial strategy of conceding guilt. The Court further held that violating a defendant's Sixth Amendment autonomy right constitutes structural error. McCoy was therefore not required to show that the error prejudiced his defense in order to receive a new trial. The Court reversed McCoy's convictions and ordered that he be given a new trial.

=== Dissent ===
Justice Samuel Alito dissented, joined by Justices Clarence Thomas and Neil Gorsuch. Alito argued that the Court had misunderstood the facts of McCoy's case. While the majority described English's strategy as a concession of guilt, Alito pointed out that English had only conceded that McCoy killed the three victims while maintaining that McCoy did not have the mental state required for first-degree murder. Because both the actus reus and the mental state must be proven for a first-degree murder conviction in Louisiana, Alito argued, English had not actually conceded McCoy's guilt of the first-degree murder charge.

Alito also argued that the Court's decision would have problematic implications for trial attorneys deciding whether to concede certain elements of a charged offense. For example, in defending a client charged with possession of a firearm by a convicted felon, Alito noted, the Court's decision left unclear whether an attorney would be bound by the client's frivolous insistence on refusing to admit that he had a prior felony conviction, which could easily be proven.

== Subsequent Developments ==
McCoy was moved from Louisiana's death row at Angola State Prison to the maximum security unit at the Bossier Parish Correctional Center to be held for retrial. Initial hearings were scheduled for May 22, 2023. Bossier Parish prosecutors intended to again pursue first-degree murder charges. During pretrial hearings, defense counsel petitioned for a mental health evaluation, claiming that McCoy lacked an understanding of the situation and was unable to assist with preparing his own defense. The judge approved the request in January 2024. In July 2024, the judge concurred with a panel of three doctors that McCoy lacked the mental capacity to defend himself. McCoy was ordered to Feliciana Forensic Facility for treatment, with status updates to be sent to the judge every 90 days.
