= Ayestas v. Davis =

- Supreme Court of the United States

Decided March 21, 2018
- Full case name: Ayestas v. Davis
- Docket no.: 16-6795
- Citations: 584 U.S. ___ (more)

Holding
- An ex parte decision by a judge can still be judicial in nature.

Court membership
- Chief Justice John Roberts Associate Justices Anthony Kennedy · Clarence Thomas; Ruth Bader Ginsburg · Stephen Breyer; Samuel Alito · Sonia Sotomayor; Elena Kagan · Neil Gorsuch

Case opinions
- Majority: Alito, joined by unanimous
- Concurrence: Sotomayor

Ayestas v. Davis, 584 U.S. ___ (2018), was a United States Supreme Court case in which the Court held that an ex parte decision by a judge can still be judicial in nature.

== Description ==
The case concerned an imprisoned person's funding request for a habeas corpus petition under a law that gave a judge discretion to approve funds that were "reasonably necessary." A judge denied the request because the imprisoned person, Ayesta, did not show a "substantial need" for the funds. The Supreme Court reversed because this "substantial need" standard was more demanding than the "reasonably necessary" language of the statute. Indeed, in the Court's estimation, the lower court was effectively requiring Ayesta to prove his case before being allowed to fund the investigation.
