= Hall v. Hall =

- Supreme Court of the United States

Argued January 16, 2018 Decided March 27, 2018
- Full case name: Elsa Hall, as Personal Representative of the Estate of Ethlyn Louise Hall and as Successor Trustee of the Ethlyn Louise Hall Family Trust, Petitioner v. Samuel Hall, et al.
- Docket no.: 16-1150
- Citations: 584 U.S. ___ (more) 138 S. Ct. 1118; 200 L. Ed. 2d 399

Case history
- Prior: 679 F. App'x 142 (3d Cir. 2017); cert. granted, 138 S. Ct. 54 (2017).

Holding
- When one of several cases consolidated under Federal Rule of Civil Procedure 42(a) is finally decided, that decision confers upon the losing party the immediate right to appeal, regardless of whether any of the other consolidated cases remain pending.

Court membership
- Chief Justice John Roberts Associate Justices Anthony Kennedy · Clarence Thomas; Ruth Bader Ginsburg · Stephen Breyer; Samuel Alito · Sonia Sotomayor; Elena Kagan · Neil Gorsuch

Case opinion
- Majority: Roberts, joined by unanimous

Hall v. Hall, 584 U.S. ___ (2018), was a United States Supreme Court case in which the Court held that within consolidated cases under Federal Rule of Civil Procedure 42(a), the losing party has the immediate right to appeal when one of the consolidated cases is finally decided, even if other cases remain pending.

== Background ==
Samuel Hall had been serving as his mother Ethyln Hall's caretaker and legal adviser in association with his legal firm. After a falling out with Samuel, Ethyln transferred her property into a trust that was managed by her daughter, Elsa Hall. The trust filed a lawsuit in 2011 against Samuel, claiming he has misappropriated over one million dollars of Ethlyn’s property. While this case was ongoing, Ethyln died (d. May 5, 2012), and Elsa became the plaintiff in this case related to the trust. Samuel filed a counter suit against Elsa as an individual, claiming she had undue influence on Ethyln's testimony during the trust case trial.

The District Court of the Virgin Islands opted to consolidate the cases under Federal Rule of Civil Procedure 42(a). The jury found against Elsa in both cases in separate judgements in early 2015. Within the month following the decision, Elsa requested a new trial in the individual case within the District Court, and on the following day submitted her appeal for the trust case to the Court of Appeals for the Third Circuit. Samuel argued that because of Elsa's request for a new trial, the individual case had not been resolved, and thus she could not appeal the trust case. The Third Circuit opted to put Elsa's appeal on hold until the District Court considered the request for a new trial, which it ended up granting about year later in March 2016. At this point, the Third Circuit decided to go ahead and hear Elsa's appeal, which including hearing oral arguments in late 2016. By February 2017, the Third Circuit dismissed Elsa's appeal on lack of jurisdiction due to the ongoing actions for the individual case in the District Court.

== Supreme Court ==
Elsa Hall petitioned the Supreme Court for writ of certiorari in early 2017. The petition noted that there had been a forty-five year long, four-way split among the Circuit Courts of how appeals should be handled in consolidated cases, and only one Supreme Court case, Gelboim v. Bank of Am. Corp. 547 U.S. ___ (2015), had considered the nature of appeals in consolidated cases but only for those that were in multidistricts. The Court agreed to hear the case in November 2017 with oral arguments held on January 16, 2018.

The court ruled in a unanimous decision on March 27, 2018, written by Chief Justice John Roberts that reversed and remanded the Third Circuit's decision to dismiss Elsa's appeal. Roberts wrote "When one of several cases consolidated under Rule 42(a) is finally decided, that decision confers upon the losing party the immediate right to appeal, regardless of whether any of the other consolidated cases remain pending".
