= Kisela v. Hughes =

- Supreme Court of the United States

Decided April 2, 2018
- Full case name: Andrew Kisela v. Amy Hughes
- Docket no.: 17-467
- Citations: 584 U.S. 100 (more)

Case history
- Prior: Judgment for Kisela (D. Ariz 2013); reversed 862 F.3d 775 (9th Cir. 2016)
- Subsequent: Judgment for Kisela (D. Ariz 2018)

Holding
- The officer was entitled to qualified immunity after shooting a person less than one minute into their interaction.

Court membership
- Chief Justice John Roberts Associate Justices Anthony Kennedy · Clarence Thomas; Ruth Bader Ginsburg · Stephen Breyer; Samuel Alito · Sonia Sotomayor; Elena Kagan · Neil Gorsuch

Case opinions
- Per curiam
- Dissent: Sotomayor, joined by Ginsburg

Kisela v. Hughes, 584 U.S. 100 (2018), was a United States Supreme Court case in which the court held that the officer was entitled to qualified immunity after shooting a person less than one minute into their interaction. Forgoing briefing and oral argument, the Supreme Court issued a summary reversal with a grant, vacate, remand order and an unsigned, per curiam opinion.

== Background ==
=== The shooting ===
In May 2010, Amy Hughes lived in a Tucson, Arizona home shared with a roommate named Sharon Chadwick. One of Hughes's neighbors called 911 to report that a woman was cutting a tree with a kitchen knife.

University of Arizona Police Department officer Andrew Kisela and an officer-in-training, Alex Garcia, heard about the report over the radio in their patrol car and responded. The person who had called 911 flagged down the officers, gave them a description of the woman with the knife, and told them the woman had been acting erratically. A third police officer, Lindsay Kunz, arrived on her bicycle. All three officers were in uniform, but they did not identify themselves as officers during the following interaction, which occurred within less than one minute of their arrival.

Officer Garcia saw Sharon Chadwick standing next to a car in the driveway of a nearby house. A chain-link fence with a locked gate separated Chadwick from the officers. The officers then saw another woman, Hughes, emerge from the house carrying a kitchen knife. The police concluded that Hughes was the person who had been cutting the tree. Hughes—in her home's yard—stopped walking and stood about six feet from Chadwick, holding the knife down at her side. Hughes was not pointing the knife at Chadwick. Hughes appeared calm. Hughes and Chadwick started talking to one another.

Chadwick later said that, during the incident, she was never in fear of Hughes and "was not the least bit threatened by the fact that [Hughes] had a knife in her hand" and that Hughes "never acted in a threatening manner." The officers did not observe Hughes commit any crime, nor did they suspect Hughes of committing one.

All three officers drew their guns. They shouted two orders in quick succession to drop the knife. Chadwick told the officers to "take it easy." Hughes did not react. Officer Kunz later testified that "it seemed as though [Hughes] didn’t even know we were there," and "[i]t was like she didn’t hear us almost." Garcia later testified that he "wanted to continue trying verbal command[s] and see if that would work." All three of the officers later said that they subjectively believed Hughes to be a threat to Chadwick.

Without giving any advance warning that he would shoot, and without attempting less dangerous methods to deescalate the situation, Kisela opened fire through the chain-link fence surrounding Hughes's yard. Hughes was standing still, and Kisela shot her four times, less than one minute after the officers' arrival.

Hughes fell to the ground, screaming in pain. She looked at the officers and asked, "Why’d you shoot me?" The officers jumped the fence, handcuffed Hughes, and called paramedics, who transported her to a hospital. There, she was treated for non-life-threatening injuries.

=== Procedural history ===
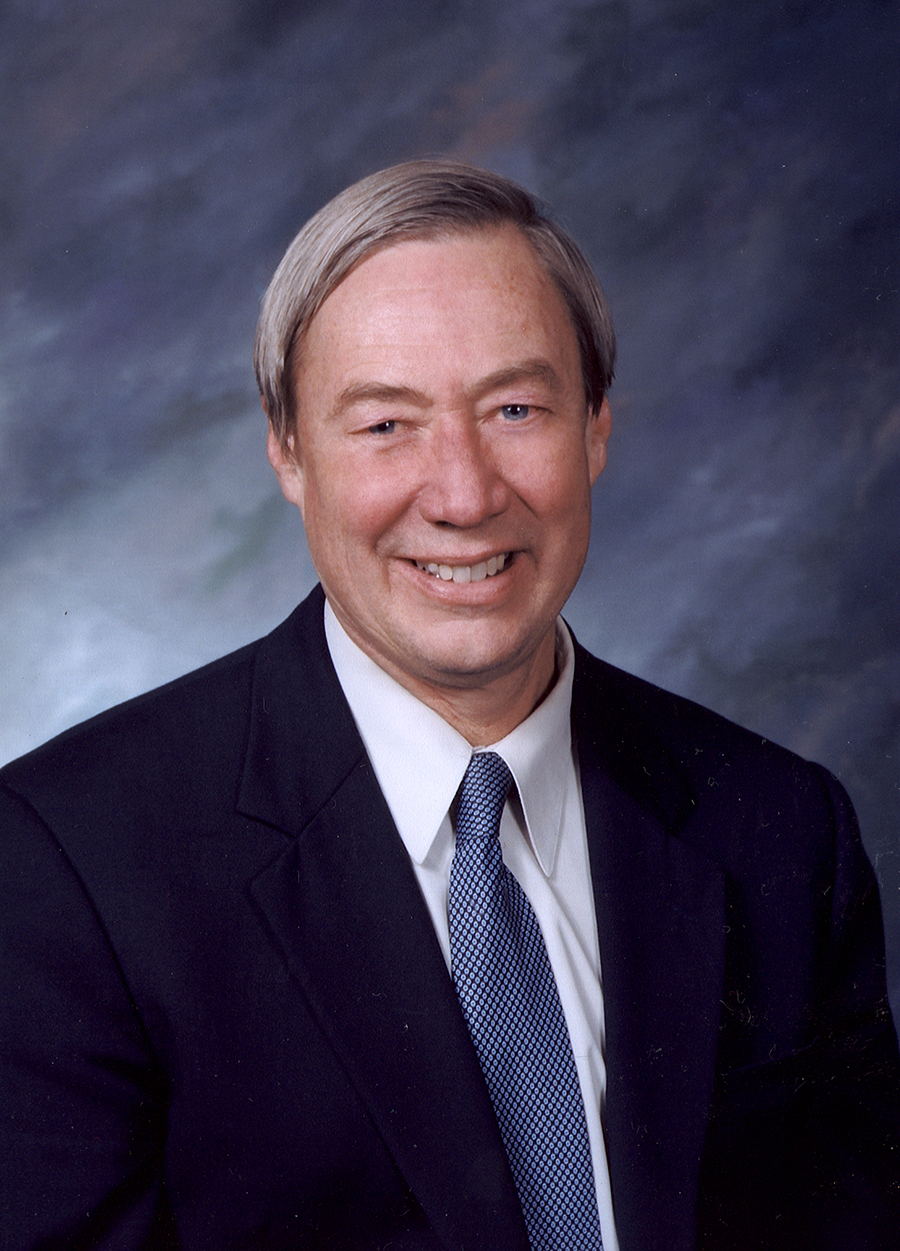
William K. Sessions III

The prosecutors of the Pima County Attorney's Office determined that Kisela did not use excessive force because Hughes was standing near Chadwick at the time of the shooting. They declined to charge him criminally for the attack.

Hughes sued Kisela under Section 1983, alleging that Kisela had used excessive force in violation of the Fourth Amendment. In the United States District Court for the District of Arizona, District Judge Frank R. Zapata granted summary judgment to Kisela on qualified-immunity grounds.

Qualified immunity attaches when an official's conduct does not violate clearly established statutory or constitutional rights of which a reasonable person would have known. Because the focus is on whether the officer had fair notice that her conduct was unlawful, reasonableness is judged against the backdrop of the law at the time of the conduct. Because the motion for summary judgement came from Kisela, the court looked at the facts in the light most favorable to Hughes.

However, the United States Court of Appeals for the Ninth Circuit reversed. A three-judge panel heard the case for the Ninth Circuit: Circuit Judges Ronald M. Gould and Marsha S. Berzon, and, sitting by designation, District Judge William K. Sessions III of the District of Vermont. In an opinion written by Sessions, the Ninth Circuit first held that the record, viewed in the light most favorable to Hughes, was sufficient to demonstrate that Kisela violated the Fourth Amendment. The court next held that the violation was clearly established because, in its view, the constitutional violation was obvious and because of Circuit precedent that the court perceived to be analogous. The Ninth Circuit pointed to a case that came out of the 1992 Ruby Ridge standoff.

Kisela filed a petition for rehearing en banc before the Ninth Circuit, but the court—over the dissent of seven judges—denied the request; in their dissent, Judges Berzon and Gould reiterated the rationale for the reversal, citing Santos v. Gates and emphasizing that “[b]ecause [the question of excessive force] nearly always requires a jury to sift through disputed factual contentions, and to draw inferences therefrom, we have held on many occasions that summary judgment or judgment as a matter of law in excessive force cases should be granted sparingly.”

Kisela filed a petition for a writ of certiorari in the United States Supreme Court.

=== Kisela's firing ===
In 2012, Andrew Kisela was fired from the University of Arizona Police Department for "intentionally and surreptitiously" recording a conversation between on-duty police dispatchers. In 2014, Kisela was permanently banned from acting as a police officer in Arizona. He relinquished his license without admitting any wrongdoing.

== Opinion of the court ==
Without briefing or oral argument, the Supreme Court issued a per curiam opinion on April 2, 2018. The court's grant, vacate, remand order summarily reversed the lower court, relieving Kisela of liability for the shooting via qualified immunity.

=== Majority opinion ===
The unsigned opinion explained that, even if the shooting by Kisela violated a Fourth Amendment right held by Hughes—"a proposition that is not at all evident," said the court—it did not matter because that right was not "clearly established." The main thrust of the opinion was a censure of the circuit courts, saying that the Supreme Court had "repeatedly told courts—and the Ninth Circuit in particular—not to define clearly established law at a high level of generality." The Supreme Court said the Ninth Circuit's comparison to Ruby Ridge "does not pass the straight-face test" because "a reasonable police officer could miss the connection between the situation confronting the sniper at Ruby Ridge"—who "shot a man in the back while the man was retreating to a cabin"—and "the situation confronting Kisela in Hughes' front yard."

If the "clearly established" law pointed to by courts was not sufficiently particular, the court said that police officers in the field would struggle to determine what they can or cannot do. Quoting Plumhoff v. Rickard, the court restated the standard like this:

Where constitutional guidelines seem inapplicable or too remote, it does not suffice for a court simply to state that an officer may not use unreasonable and excessive force, deny qualified immunity, and then remit the case for a trial on the question of reasonableness. An officer "cannot be said to have violated a clearly established right unless the right’s contours were sufficiently definite that any reasonable official in the defendant’s shoes would have understood that he was violating it." That is a necessary part of the qualified-immunity standard, and it is a part of the standard that the Court of Appeals here failed to implement in a correct way.

=== Dissent ===
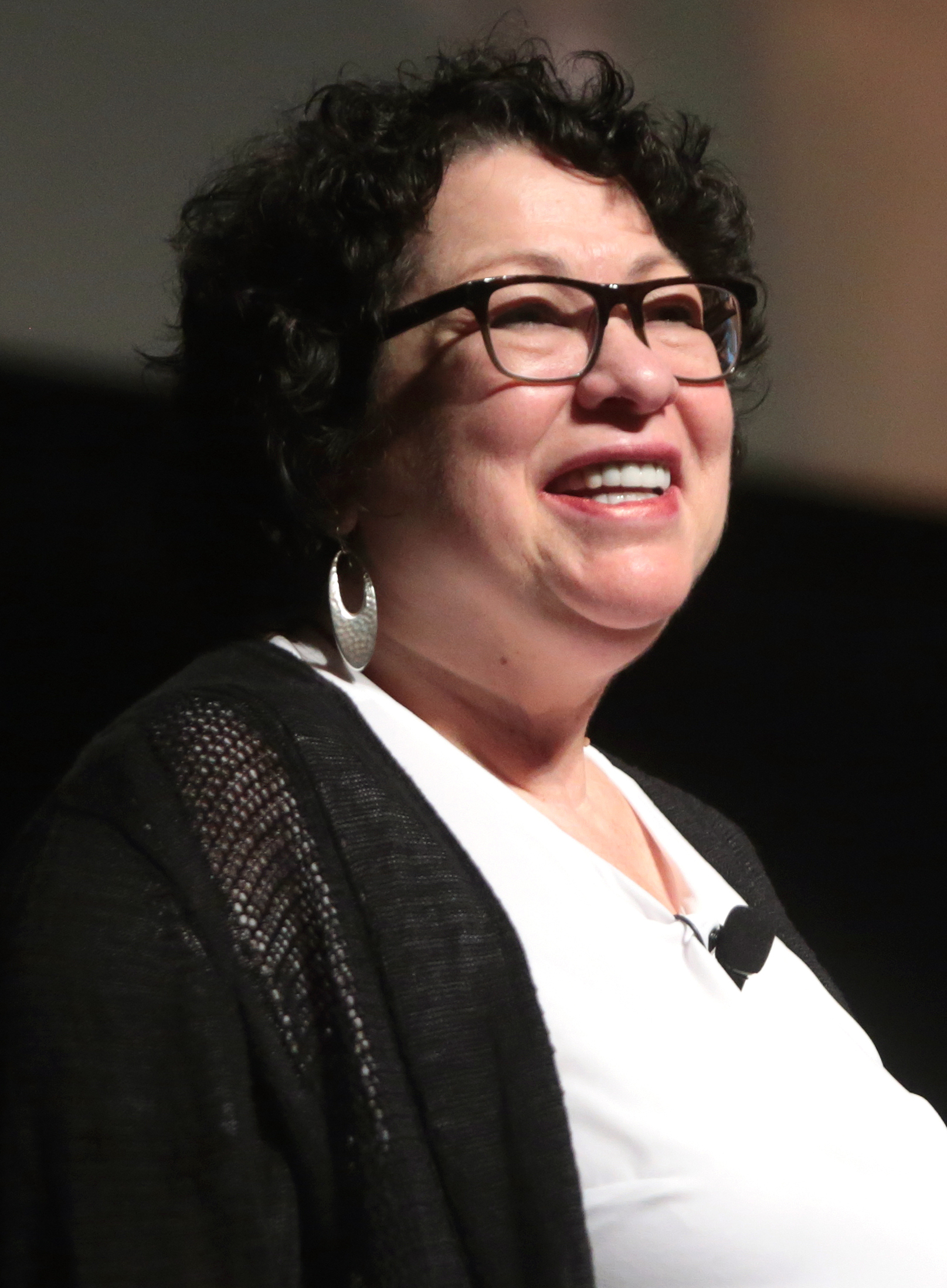
Sonia Sotomayor in 2017

Justice Sonia Sotomayor wrote a dissent, which Justice Ruth Bader Ginsburg joined. Sotomayor observed that the case came to the court on a summary judgment motion from Kisela, so the court was required to view the evidence in the light most favorable to Hughes. Sotomayor said that the Supreme Court had never held that the "clearly established law" standard in qualified immunity can only be met when there is a pre-existing case with exactly the same facts in which the officer lost. Sotomayor criticized the majority for summarily deciding the case without oral argument.

Moreover, Sotomayor noted that the majority opinion outright omitted facts that were unflattering for Kisela. Sotomayor wrote that current case law did clearly establish that Kisela's conduct was unconstitutional. Sotomayor criticized a trend in the Supreme Court's jurisprudence of strictly reversing findings that officers were not entitled to qualified immunity while seemingly never upholding cases where officers were rightfully denied qualified immunity. She said:

Such a one-sided approach to qualified immunity transforms the doctrine into an absolute shield for law enforcement officers, gutting the deterrent effect of the Fourth Amendment. The majority today exacerbates that troubling asymmetry. Its decision is not just wrong on the law; it also sends an alarming signal to law enforcement officers and the public. It tells officers that they can shoot first and think later, and it tells the public that palpably unreasonable conduct will go unpunished. Because there is nothing right or just under the law about this, I respectfully dissent.

== Later developments ==
After the Supreme Court's decision, the case returned to the District of Arizona. In that court, District Judge Zapata reinstated his earlier decision in Kisela's favor, closing the case.
