= Exxon Corp. v. Eagerton =

Exxon Corp v. Eagerton
- Supreme Court of the United States

Argued February 22, 1983 Decided June 8, 1983
- Full case name: Exxon Corp v. Eagerton
- Docket no.: 81-1020
- Citations: 462 U.S. 176 (more)
- Argument: Oral argument

Court membership
- Chief Justice Warren E. Burger Associate Justices William J. Brennan Jr. · Byron White; Thurgood Marshall · Harry Blackmun; Lewis F. Powell Jr. · William Rehnquist; John P. Stevens · Sandra Day O'Connor

Case opinion
- Majority: Marshall, joined by Blackmun, Brennan, Burger, O'Connor, Powell, Rehnquist, Stevens, White

Laws applied
- Contract and Equal Protection Clauses

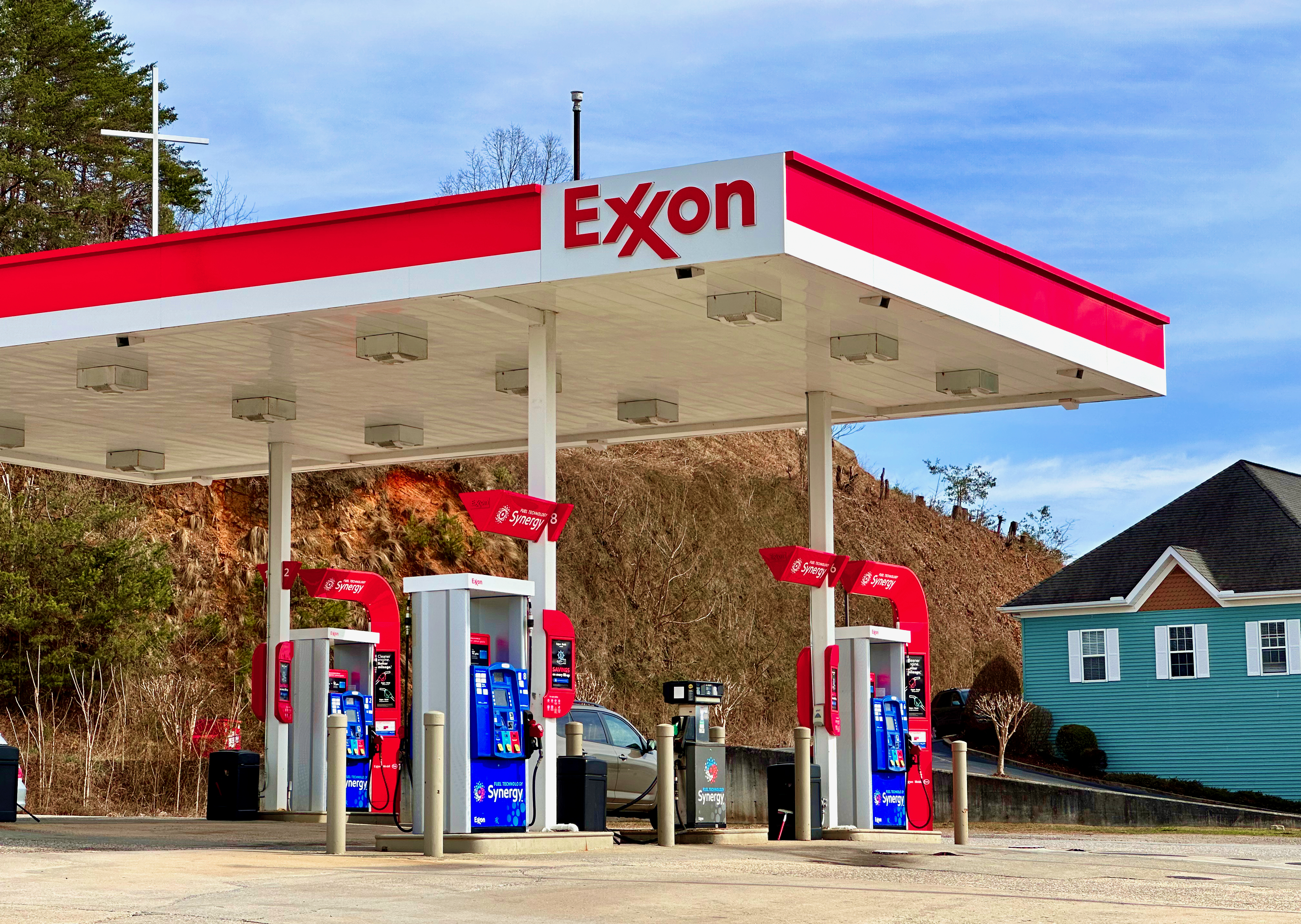
Exxon Mobile Gas Station

Exxon Corp. v. Eagerton, 462 U.S. 176 (1983), is a U.S. Supreme Court decision that upheld an Alabama law preventing oil and gas producers from passing on severance tax increases to consumers. The court ruled that the law was not in violation of the Contract Clause or the Equal Protection Clause of the U.S. Constitution. This case arose when Exxon argued that the law passed by the state of Alabama was unconstitutional because it interfered with private contracts and treated companies like Exxon unfairly. The court ruled against Exxon arguing that states could create laws that affect contracts as long as they apply to the majority and served a public purpose.

== Background ==
In the 1970's Alabama created a severance tax on oil and gas production within the state. In 1981, the state raised the tax and stated that the producers could not pass the tax onto the consumer through contracts. Exxon and other oil and gas companies had contracts already established where they could pass on the cost that this amendment affected. Exxon argued that this amendment interfered with those contracts already established.

Exxon sued challenging the amendment stating that the law broke the Constitution's Contract Clause, which states that a state cannot pass laws that impair contracts. Exxon also claimed that producers were being treated unfairly, which violated the Equal Protection Clause.

Another case in which the Supreme Court determined that a state’s sovereign power to protect public interests justified the impairment of private contracts is Keystone Bituminous Coal Ass'n v. DeBenedictis. In that case, the Pennsylvania legislature, concerned about public safety, land conservation, and other issues, enacted a law prohibiting mining that would damage existing structures, such as public buildings and homes, by eliminating underground support.

== Argument ==
Exxon argued that the law was unconstitutional because they had legal contracts in place and this law would change the terms of the contracts. Exxon believed that their right to pass on tax costs to consumers was being unlawfully taken away by the state of Alabama. Exxon also believed that they were being discriminated against as this affected oil and gas companies specifically.

Alabama argued that they had the right to protect consumers from higher prices. Alabama stated that the law applied to all energy producers in the state so that it wasn't discriminatory. The state believed that as the law was protecting the public interest, it was a valid use of the state's power.

== Lower courts ==
In the lower Alabama State Court, in Montgomery County, the case was ruled in favor of Exxon. The court ruled that the law violated the Contract Clause of the U.S. Constitution, the Equal Protection Clause, and the court held that the Natural Gas Policy Act of 1978 preempted the Alabama law when it applied to the Interstate sale of natural gas, as this was an area that was already regulated by Federal law.

The case then went on to the Alabama Supreme Court where they partially reversed the ruling. The court upheld the anti pass-through rule for in-state oil and gas sales, rejecting the Contract Clause and Equal Protection arguments. However, it agreed that Federal law preempted the state's regulation of interstate natural gas sales.

== Supreme Court decision ==
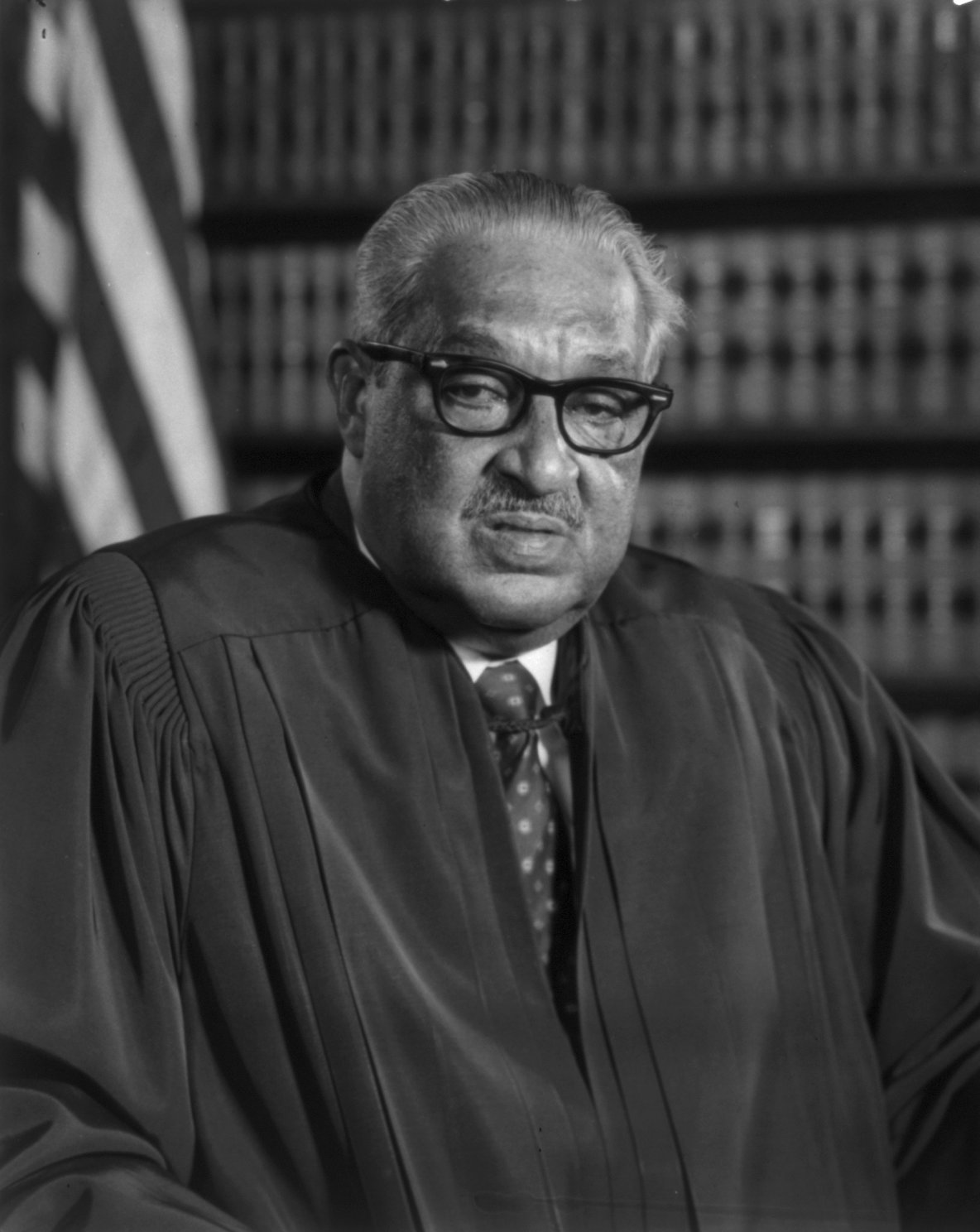
Justice Thurgood Marshall who authored the majority opinion.

The U.S. Supreme Court also ruled in majority favor of the state of Alabama. They didn't just vote in majority favor, the decision was unanimous. Justice Thurgood Marshall wrote the majority opinion, stating that the law didn't violate the Contract Clause because the rule was meant to protect the public, and was not created to target specific contracts and companies. The court said that not every law that affects contracts is unconstitutional, only those that unfairly interfere without a good reason.

The Court also concluded that, "Appellants' Contract Clause challenge to the royalty-owner exemption fails for the simple reason that there is nothing to suggest that that exemption nullified any contractual obligations of which appellants were the beneficiaries."

The Court stated, "We agree with the Supreme Court of Alabama that the pass-through prohibition did not conflict with this provision. On its face 110(a) of the NGPA does not give any seller the affirmative right to include in his price an amount necessary to recover state severance taxes."

The Court deemed the pass-through prohibition to be similar to state laws setting rates in heavily regulated industries, like the electricity industry or oil transportation sector, which were consistent with the Contract Clause despite their incidental effect on existing contracts.

It was noted that, "Alabama's power to prohibit oil and gas producers from passing the increase in the severance tax on to their purchasers is confirmed by several decisions of this Court rejecting Contract Clause challenges to state rate-setting schemes that displaced any rates previously established by contract."

The court also ruled against Exxon regarding their Equal Protection argument. They said the law was created as a way to protect consumers and that it didn't discriminate against a specific company or group in a way that violated the Constitution. The Court argued that neither the Equal Protection argument or the pass through prohibition challenged provisions adversely affected a fundamental interest.

== Significance ==
In Exxon Corp. v. Eagerton, the court made it clear that, consistent with the Contract Clause, states are able to pass laws that affect contracts as long as it benefits the public and is applied consistently. This case determined a clear path for states to be able to establish laws that affect contracts. This case is cited frequently in regard to how courts rule regarding contract rights pitted against the benefit of the public.

== See also ==
- Pacific Gas & Electric Co. v. State Energy Resources Conservation & Development Commission, 461 U. S. 190, 203-204 (1983).
- Maryland v. Louisiana, 451 U. S. 725, 748 (1981).
- Energy Reserves Group, Inc. v. Kansas Power & Light Co., 459 U. S. 400, 420-421 (1983).
