= Dahda v. United States =

- Supreme Court of the United States

Decided May 14, 2018
- Full case name: Dahda v. United States
- Docket no.: 17-43
- Citations: 584 U.S. ___ (more)

Holding
- Because the wiretap orders did not lack any information that the statute required them to include and would have been sufficient absent the superfluous language authorizing interception outside the court's territorial jurisdiction, the orders were not facially insufficient.

Court membership
- Chief Justice John Roberts Associate Justices Anthony Kennedy · Clarence Thomas; Ruth Bader Ginsburg · Stephen Breyer; Samuel Alito · Sonia Sotomayor; Elena Kagan · Neil Gorsuch

Case opinion
- Majority: Breyer, joined by unanimous
- Gorsuch took no part in the consideration or decision of the case.

Dahda v. United States, 584 U.S. ___ (2018), was a United States Supreme Court case in which the court held that because the wiretap orders did not lack any information that the statute required them to include and would have been sufficient absent the superfluous language authorizing interception outside the court's territorial jurisdiction, the orders were not facially insufficient.

== Background ==
Under federal law, a judge normally may issue a wiretap order permitting the interception of communications only "within the territorial jurisdiction of the court in which the judge is sitting." In this case, a judge for the District of Kansas authorized nine wiretap orders as part of a government investigation of a suspected drug distribution ring in Kansas. For the most part, the government intercepted communications from a listening post within Kansas. But each order also contained a sentence purporting to authorize interception outside of Kansas. Based on that authorization, the government intercepted additional communications from a listening post in Missouri. Following the investigation, Los and Roosevelt Dahda were indicted for participating in an illegal drug distribution conspiracy. They moved to suppress the evidence derived from all the wiretaps under the wiretap statute's suppression provision because the language authorizing interception beyond the federal district court's territorial jurisdiction rendered each order "insufficient on its face." The government agreed not to introduce any evidence arising from its Missouri listening post, and the federal district court denied the Dahdas' motion. On appeal, the Tenth Circuit Court of Appeals rejected the Dahdas' facial-insufficiency argument on the ground that the challenged language did not implicate Congress' core statutory concerns in enacting the wiretap statute.

== Opinion of the court ==
The Supreme Court issued an opinion on May 14, 2018.
