= United States v. Sanchez-Gomez =

- Supreme Court of the United States

Decided May 14, 2018
- Full case name: United States v. Sanchez-Gomez
- Docket no.: 17-312
- Citations: 584 U.S. ___ (more)

Holding
- There is no analog to class actions under the Federal Rules of Criminal Procedure, and there is no "capable of repetition yet evading review" exception for mootness where repetition would require the defendant to be charged with a crime in the future.

Court membership
- Chief Justice John Roberts Associate Justices Anthony Kennedy · Clarence Thomas; Ruth Bader Ginsburg · Stephen Breyer; Samuel Alito · Sonia Sotomayor; Elena Kagan · Neil Gorsuch

Case opinion
- Majority: Roberts, joined by unanimous

United States v. Sanchez-Gomez, 584 U.S. ___ (2018), was a United States Supreme Court case in which the Court held that there is no analog to class actions under the Federal Rules of Criminal Procedure, and there is no "capable of repetition yet evading review" exception for mootness where repetition would require the defendant to be charged with a crime in the future.

== Description ==
Four criminal defendants were fully shackled during pretrial hearings. They appealed, claiming the shackling policy was unconstitutional. In the meantime, each of their cases concluded.

The Ninth Circuit Court of Appeals agreed with the defendants and held the pretrial shackling policy unconstitutional. To avoid the mootness issue, the Ninth Circuit analogized to class actions in the civil system and effectively said that the case was not moot because the shackling policy was an ongoing problem even if these defendants were no longer involved.

However, the Supreme Court reversed that ruling from the Ninth Circuit as moot. Even if the shackling policy was unconstitutional, these defendants' cases were over, so they were no longer in a position to challenge the shackling policy. Class actions are creatures of the Federal Rules of Civil Procedure which do not exist in the criminal system. The "capable of repetition yet evading review" exception did not apply because these defendants could not show that they would be subject to the shackling policy again without being accused of future criminal conduct.
