= Washington v. United States =

- Supreme Court of the United States

Argued April 18, 2018 Decided June 11, 2018
- Full case name: Washington v. United States
- Docket no.: 17-269
- Citations: 584 U.S. 837 (more) 138 S. Ct. 1832; 201 L. Ed. 2d 200

Case history
- Prior: United States v. Washington, 853 F.3d 946 (9th Cir. 2017); cert. granted, 138 S. Ct. 735 (2018).

Holding
- Lower court upheld by divided Court.

Court membership
- Chief Justice John Roberts Associate Justices Anthony Kennedy · Clarence Thomas; Ruth Bader Ginsburg · Stephen Breyer; Samuel Alito · Sonia Sotomayor; Elena Kagan · Neil Gorsuch

Case opinion
- Per curiam
- Kennedy took no part in the consideration or decision of the case.

Washington v. United States, 584 U.S. 837 (2018), was a United States Supreme Court case regarding Native American fishing rights in the U.S. state of Washington. In the case, the court deadlocked 4-4, with Justice Anthony Kennedy recusing himself due to his prior involvement in the case as a judge on the United States Ninth Circuit Court of Appeals. The deadlock left standing a lower court ruling that the State of Washington must redesign and rebuild road culverts to allow salmon to swim upstream, to uphold Native American treaty rights to fish. The issue decided by the federal courts was whether, under the 1855–1856 Stevens Treaties, "the right to fish is the right to put a net in the water or the right for there to be fish to catch"; however, with the 4-4 Supreme Court decision, it may not be binding on future court decisions.

The case was argued on April 18, 2018. The decision was per curiam.

The state was given until 2030 to repair the highest-priority culverts. The Washington State Department of Transportation estimated that cost of meeting the 2030 deadline to be $9 billion. An agreement between the state and tribes to enter mediation was reached in March 2025.

== See also ==
- United States v. Washington, aka Boldt Decision, landmark 1974 ruling establishing treaty fishing rights in Washington
- Puget Sound salmon
- Stream restoration
