= Marinello v. United States =

- Supreme Court of the United States

Decided March 21, 2018
- Full case name: Marinello v. United States
- Docket no.: 16-1144
- Citations: 584 U.S. ___ (more)

Holding
- To convict a defendant under the Internal Revenue Code's Omnibus Clause, the Government must prove the defendant was aware of a pending tax-related proceeding, such as a particular investigation or audit, or could reasonably foresee that such a proceeding would commence.

Court membership
- Chief Justice John Roberts Associate Justices Anthony Kennedy · Clarence Thomas; Ruth Bader Ginsburg · Stephen Breyer; Samuel Alito · Sonia Sotomayor; Elena Kagan · Neil Gorsuch

Case opinions
- Majority: Breyer
- Dissent: Thomas, joined by Alito

Laws applied
- Internal Revenue Code

Marinello v. United States, 584 U.S. ___ (2018), was a United States Supreme Court case in which the court held that, to convict a defendant under the Internal Revenue Code's Omnibus Clause, the Government must prove the defendant was aware of a pending tax-related proceeding, such as a particular investigation or audit, or could reasonably foresee that such a proceeding would commence.

== Background ==
Between 2004 and 2009, the Internal Revenue Service (IRS) intermittently investigated Carlo J. Marinello's tax activities. In 2012, the government indicted Marinello for violating, among other criminal tax statutes, a provision in 26 U.S.C. § 7212(a) known as the Omnibus Clause, which forbids "corruptly or by force or threats of force... obstruct[ing] or imped[ing], or endeavor[ing] to obstruct or impede, the due administration of [the Internal Revenue Code]." The judge instructed the jury that, to convict Marinello of an Omnibus Clause violation, it must find that he "corruptly" engaged in at least one of eight specified activities, but the jury was not told that it needed to find that Marinello knew he was under investigation and intended corruptly to interfere with that investigation. Marinello was convicted. The Second Circuit Court of Appeals affirmed, rejecting his claim that an Omnibus Clause violation requires the Government to show the defendant tried to interfere with a pending IRS proceeding, such as a particular investigation.
