= Lamar, Archer & Cofrin, LLP v. Appling =

- Supreme Court of the United States

Decided June 4, 2018
- Full case name: Lamar, Archer & Cofrin, LLP v. Appling
- Docket no.: 16-1215
- Citations: 584 U.S. ___ (more)

Holding
- A debtor's statement about a single asset can be a "statement respecting the debtor’s financial condition" under the Bankruptcy Code's exceptions to discharge; therefore, debt associated with a single-asset statement that is not in writing may be discharged.

Court membership
- Chief Justice John Roberts Associate Justices Anthony Kennedy · Clarence Thomas; Ruth Bader Ginsburg · Stephen Breyer; Samuel Alito · Sonia Sotomayor; Elena Kagan · Neil Gorsuch

Case opinion
- Majority: Sotomayor

Lamar, Archer & Cofrin, LLP v. Appling, 584 U.S. ___ (2018), was a United States Supreme Court case in which the court held that a debtor's statement about a single asset can be a "statement respecting the debtor’s financial condition" under the Bankruptcy Code's exceptions to discharge; therefore, debt associated with a single-asset statement that is not in writing may be discharged.

== Background ==
R. Scott Appling fell behind on his bills owed to the law firm Lamar, Archer & Cofrin, LLP, which threatened to withdraw representation and place a lien on its work product if Appling did not pay. Appling told Lamar that he could cover owed and future legal expenses with an expected tax refund, so Lamar agreed to continue representation. However, Appling used the refund, which was for much less than he had stated, for business expenses. When he met with Lamar again, he told the firm he was still waiting on the refund, so Lamar agreed to complete pending litigation. Appling never paid the final invoice, so Lamar sued him and obtained a judgment. Shortly thereafter, Appling and his wife filed for Chapter 7 bankruptcy. Lamar initiated an adversary proceeding against Appling in Bankruptcy Court, arguing that his debt to Lamar was nondischargeable pursuant to 11 U. S. C. §523(a)(2)(A), which bars discharge of specified debts arising from "false pretenses, a false representation, or actual fraud, other than a statement respecting the debtor's... financial condition." Appling moved to dismiss on the ground that his alleged misrepresentations were "statement[s] respecting the debtor's... financial condition," which §523(a)(2)(B) requires to be "in writing." The Bankruptcy Court disagreed and denied Appling's motion. Finding that Appling knowingly made two false representations on which Lamar justifiably relied and that Lamar incurred damages as a result, the court concluded that Appling's debt to Lamar was nondischargeable under §523(a)(2)(A). The District Court affirmed, but the Eleventh Circuit Court of Appeals reversed, holding that a "statement respecting the debtor's financial condition" may include a statement about a single asset. Because Appling's statements were not in writing, the court held, §523(a)(2)(B) did not bar him from discharging his debt to Lamar.

== Opinion of the court ==
The Supreme Court issued an opinion on June 4, 2018.
