= Encino Motorcars v. Navarro =

- Supreme Court of the United States

Argued June 20, 2016 Decided June 20, 2016
- Full case name: Encino Motorcars, LLC v. Hector Navarro, et al
- Docket no.: 15-415
- Citations: 579 U.S. 211 (more) 136 S. Ct. 2117; 195 L. Ed. 2d 282

Case history
- Prior: 780 F.3d 1267 (9th Cir. 2015)
- Subsequent: 845 F.3d 925 (9th Cir. 2017); reversed, No. 16-1362, 584 U.S. ___ (2018).

Holding
- Courts cannot apply Chevron deference to a regulation that is procedurally defective or lacks an adequate explanation for a deviation from longstanding agency policy; such regulations are arbitrary and capricious.

Court membership
- Chief Justice John Roberts Associate Justices Anthony Kennedy · Clarence Thomas; Ruth Bader Ginsburg · Stephen Breyer; Samuel Alito · Sonia Sotomayor; Elena Kagan

Case opinions
- Majority: Kennedy, joined by Roberts, Ginsburg, Breyer, Sotomayor, Kagan
- Dissent: Thomas, joined by Alito

Laws applied
- Fair Labor Standards Act

Encino Motorcars v. Navarro, 579 U.S. ___ (2016), 584 U.S. ___ (2018), was a Supreme Court of the United States case addressing overtime pay. Specifically at issue is whether automotive service advisors are eligible for overtime pay under the Fair Labor Standards Act.

The case had been heard twice by the Supreme Court. In the first pass, the Court had vacated a previous decision by the Ninth Circuit Appeals Court which relied on an interpretive ruling on the Fair Labor Standards Act provided by the United States Department of Labor to state that service advisors were not exempt, and remanded the case back to the Ninth Circuit. On rehearing, the Ninth Circuit again ruled that the exemption does not include service advisors; its decision was reversed in the Supreme Court's 2018 ruling.

== Facts and prior history ==
Respondents are "service advisors" at Mercedes-Benz of Encino (California). Their primary job responsibilities involve identifying service needs and selling service solutions to the dealership's customers. Respondents brought suit against the dealership under the Fair Labor Standards Act (FLSA), seeking time-and-a-half overtime pay for working more than 40 hours per week.

The FLSA exempts from its overtime requirements "any salesman, partsman, or mechanic primarily engaged in selling or servicing automobiles." The district court denied the claims, concluding that a service advisor is a "salesman . . . engaged in ... servicing automobiles" and therefore exempt from the FLSA's overtime requirements. The Ninth Circuit reversed, citing a 2011 Department of Labor interpretive regulation stating that service advisors are not exempt under §213(b)(10)(A) because they do not personally service automobiles. This finding was contrary for findings from the Fourth and Fifth Circuits, several district courts, and the Supreme Court of Montana," all of which held that service advisors are exempt employees.

== First Supreme Court opinion ==
Encino petitioned to the Supreme Court, who granted certiorari, and heard the case on April 20, 2016. The Court ruled on June 20, 2016, giving a 6-2 decision to vacate the Ninth Circuit's decision and remanded the case back to that court. The majority decision was provided by Justice Anthony Kennedy, joined by Justices Roberts, Ginsburg, Breyer, Sotomayor, and Kagan. Kennedy's opinion focused on whether the 2011 DOL regulation qualified for the "Chevron deference", defined by Chevron U.S.A., Inc. v. Natural Resources Defense Council, Inc. and which states that courts must defer to regulations made by the appropriate administrative agency granted powers by Congress on some matters. Kennedy stated that past cases related to the Chevron deference, such as FCC v. Fox (2009) and National Cable & Telecommunications Ass'n v. Brand X Internet Services (2005), determined that this deference is only allowable when agencies make these regulations with "good reasons for the new policy"; the 2011 DOL policy change, the Court determined, was a complete change from a 1978 DOL policy, and the DOL did not provide adequate rationale for its change. As such, the Court ruled that the Ninth could not consider the 2011 DOL ruling as part of its decision. Kennedy's decision otherwise did not rule on the other merits of the case.

Justice Clarence Thomas wrote a dissenting opinion, joined by Justice Alito. In the dissent, Thomas agreed that the 2011 DOL ruling did not enjoy Chevron deference, but believed that the Supreme Court should evaluate the other merits of the case at that time, and in his opinion, the FLSA should be read to have service advisers as exempt from overtime as they are "primarily engaged in ... servicing automobiles", and suggested reversal of the Ninth Circuit's decision on this basis.

== Remand to Ninth Circuit ==
The Ninth Circuit still found against Encino during the rehearing, ruling that the service advisors were not exempt, basing their decision primarily on the legislative history of FLSA.

== Second Supreme Court opinion ==
Encino Motorcars v. Navarro
- Supreme Court of the United States

Argued January 17, 2018 Decided April 2, 2018
- Full case name: Encino Motorcars, LLC v. Hector Navarro, et al
- Docket no.: 16-1362
- Citations: 584 U.S. ___ (more) 138 S. Ct. 1134; 200 L. Ed. 2d 433; 168 Lab. Cas. (CCH) ¶ 36,610

Case history
- Prior: 845 F.3d 925 (9th Cir. 2017)

Holding
- Automotive service advisors are considered exempt from overtime pay under the Fair Labor Standards Act, reversing the decision of the Ninth Circuit

Court membership
- Chief Justice John Roberts Associate Justices Anthony Kennedy · Clarence Thomas; Ruth Bader Ginsburg · Stephen Breyer; Samuel Alito · Sonia Sotomayor; Elena Kagan · Neil Gorsuch

Case opinions
- Majority: Thomas, joined by Roberts, Kennedy, Alito, Gorsuch
- Dissent: Ginsburg, joined by Breyer, Sotomayor, Kagan

Laws applied
- Fair Labor Standards Act

Encino again appealed to the Supreme Court, which agreed to hear the case in September 2017. The case provides the unusual example of the same case being heard a second time, allowing a view into the new court's attitude toward federal rulemaking.

The Court heard oral arguments January 17, 2018. The court issued its ruling on April 2, 2018, in a 5–4 decision that reversed the Ninth Circuit and affirmed that service advisors are to be considered exempt under FLSA. The majority opinion was written by Justice Clarence Thomas joined by Justices Roberts, Alito, Kennedy, and Gorsuch, while Justice Ruth Bader Ginsburg wrote the dissenting opinion joined by Justices Breyer, Sotomayor, and Kagan.

== See also ==
- Fair Labor Standards Act
