= Azar v. Garza =

- Supreme Court of the United States

Decided June 4, 2018
- Full case name: Alex Azar, II, Secretary of Health and Human Services, et al. v. Rochelle Garza, as guardian ad litem to unaccompanied minor J. D.
- Docket no.: 17-654
- Citations: 584 U.S. ___ (more)

Case history
- Prior: Temporary restraining order granted, Garza v. Hargan, No. 1:17-cv–02122 (D.D.C. Oct. 18, 2017); vacated in part, D.C. Cir., Oct. 19, 2017; vacated and remanded, 874 F. 3d 735 (D.C. Cir. 2017) (en banc)

Holding
- Judgment below should be vacated and remanded with a direction to dismiss when a federal civil case has become moot while on its way to the Supreme Court.

Court membership
- Chief Justice John Roberts Associate Justices Anthony Kennedy · Clarence Thomas; Ruth Bader Ginsburg · Stephen Breyer; Samuel Alito · Sonia Sotomayor; Elena Kagan · Neil Gorsuch

Case opinion
- Per curiam

Laws applied
- U.S. Const. amend. XIV

Garza v. Hargan (Azar v. Garza after Alex Azar's confirmation as United States Secretary of Health and Human Services) was a case before the United States Court of Appeals for the District of Columbia Circuit regarding a juvenile undocumented immigrant in the custody of U.S. Immigration and Customs Enforcement who sought to have an abortion.

== Background ==
In early September 2017, a seventeen-year-old Jane Doe was apprehended after illegally crossing the Mexico–United States border into Texas. As an unaccompanied minor, Jane was placed into care of the Office of Refugee Resettlement. Jane, who was then eight weeks pregnant, was sent to an ORR funded shelter where she decided to have an abortion. A Texas judge granted Jane a judicial bypass to the state's parental consent law and allowed her to seek an abortion on September 25, 2017.

The ORR refused to allow Jane to leave the shelter to have her abortion. In March 2017, new ORR Director Scott Lloyd had forbid federally funded shelters from taking "any action that facilitates" an abortion without his express approval. Jane's guardian ad litem, Rochelle Garza, then sued the Acting United States Secretary of Health and Human Services, Eric Hargan, in the United States District Court for the District of Columbia, alleging that the government was violating Jane's constitutional right to an abortion in the United States.

On October 18, 2017, U.S. District Judge Tanya S. Chutkan granted Jane's request for a temporary restraining order, ordering the government to allow Jane to leave the shelter to attend the pre-abortion counseling required by Texas law and to undergo the abortion. On October 20, a panel of the United States Court of Appeals for the District of Columbia Circuit granted the government's emergency motion to stay Judge Chutkan's order. In an unsigned order by Circuit Judges Brett Kavanaugh and Karen L. Henderson, the court allowed ORR to keep Jane from leaving its shelter to undergo an abortion until October 31, provided that the government "expeditiously" placed Jane in an outside sponsor's custody. Circuit Judge Patricia Millett wrote a dissent in which she argued the majority was imposing an undue burden on abortion in violation of Whole Woman's Health v. Hellerstedt (2016).

On October 24, the full en banc D.C. Circuit reversed the panel majority, reimposing the district court order requiring the government to grant Jane access to an abortion. Judge Millet added a concurrence reiterating the arguments in her earlier dissent. Judge Henderson dissented, arguing that an undocumented immigrant is not a "person" under the United States Constitution and so does not have rights under the Due Process Clause. Judge Kavanaugh, joined by Judges Henderson and Thomas B. Griffith, dissented, defending the panel decision. That day, District Judge Chutkan amended her order to allow Jane's abortion to proceed "promptly and without delay". Jane had her pregnancy aborted on October 25.

== Supreme Court ==
On November 3, 2017, the Solicitor General of the United States, Noel Francisco, petitioned the Supreme Court of the United States for a writ of certiorari to vacate the D.C. Circuit's ruling and moved for sanctions against Jane's lawyers at the American Civil Liberties Union. Francisco accused David D. Cole of professional misconduct for not informing the Justice Department that Jane's abortion procedure had been rescheduled to earlier than anticipated. According to Francisco, this wrongfully prevented the government from seeking an emergency order from the Supreme Court blocking the procedure.

On June 4, 2018, the Supreme Court granted review and vacated the judgment on the ground that the claim for injunctive relief granted by the lower court had become moot when the girl followed through with the abortion. Vacating the lower court decision prevents it from having any value as precedent. The Court did not grant the government's request for sanctions against Jane's attorneys. The opinion was unsigned.

== Related developments ==
On December 18, 2017, Judge Chutkan granted relief to two additional pregnant girls in ORR care who had sued for access to an abortion. On March 30, 2018, Judge Chutkan certified the pregnant girls' lawsuit as a class action and ordered the government to provide access to abortions to all girls in ORR's custody.
