= Sveen v. Melin =

2018 U.S. Supreme Court case

- Supreme Court of the United States

Argued March 19, 2018 Decided June 11, 2018
- Full case name: Ashley Sveen, et al., v. Kaye Melin
- Docket no.: 16-1432
- Citations: 584 U.S. 811 (more)
- Argument: https://www.oyez.org/cases/2017/16-1432
- Decision: Opinion

Holding
- A law providing that the dissolution or annulment of a marriage revokes any revocable beneficiary designation made by a person to the person's former spouse does not violate the Contracts Clause.

Court membership
- Chief Justice John Roberts Associate Justices Anthony Kennedy · Clarence Thomas; Ruth Bader Ginsburg · Stephen Breyer; Samuel Alito · Sonia Sotomayor; Elena Kagan · Neil Gorsuch

Case opinions
- Majority: Kagan, joined by Roberts, Kennedy, Thomas, Ginsburg, Breyer, Alito, Sotomayor
- Dissent: Gorsuch

Laws applied
- Contracts Clause

Sveen v. Melin, 584 U.S. 811 (2018), was a case in which the U.S. Supreme Court decided whether a Minnesota law violated the Contract Clause of the Constitution of the United States.

== Background ==
In 1997, Mark Sveen and Kaye Melin got married, and the next year, Sveen purchased a life insurance policy. Melin was named as the primary beneficiary on this policy, and two of his children from a prior marriage were named as contingent beneficiaries. Sveen and Melin divorced in 2007, but the family court made no mention of the insurance policy. Sveen died in 2011, and a dispute developed between Melin and Sveen's children as to which of them could collect on his policy.

According to a 2002 Minnesota law, "the dissolution or annulment of a marriage revokes any revocable[ ] disposition, beneficiary designation, or appointment of property made by an individual to the individual’s former spouse in a governing instrument," where a governing instrument is defined to include insurance policies. This meant that in the event of a divorce, one partner would be presumptively removed from the other's policies as a beneficiary and vice-versa. Sveen's children claimed that under this law, since their father had not explicitly sought to keep Melin on as his primary beneficiary, they should receive the death benefit.

Article 1, Section 10, Clause 2 of the Constitution, colloquially known as the Contract Clause, says that "no state shall pass any Law impairing the obligation of contracts." Melin argued that, since the Minnesota law did not exist when her ex-husband purchased his insurance policy, to allow it to alter the terms of that policy later would be a violation of the Constitution.

The District Court of Minnesota ruled in favor of the Sveens, but the United States Court of Appeals for the Eighth Circuit reversed on appeal.

== Supreme Court ==
The court reversed the Eighth Circuit in an 8–1 decision with the majority opinion authored by Associate Justice Elena Kagan.

=== Majority opinion ===
Justice Kagan stated that in Contract Clause cases, the court typically applies a two-step test. First, the court asks a threshold question as to whether the state law has "operated as a substantial impairment of a contractual relationship." If the court finds that there is a substantial impairment, they then move on to the second part of the test, which asks whether the law is an “appropriate” and “reasonable” way to advance “a significant and legitimate public purpose.” Kagan claimed that there were three reasons to stop after the first step and rule against Melin.

First, the law purported to support and further the policy holder's intent rather than impair it, because "most divorcees do not aspire to enrich their former partners."

Second, the law did not disturb a policy holder's expectations because it is well within the power of divorce courts to revoke beneficiary status upon the dissolution of a marriage. Kagan's broader argument on this point was that during a divorce all assets, homes, cars, and insurance policies, are "up for grabs," and as such Melin had no reliance interest in remaining the primary beneficiary on her ex-husband's policy.

Third, if Sveen had so wished, he could have easily prevented the default rule from removing Melin from his policy by submitting a beneficiary change form to reinstate her, or simply informing the insurance company of his intention to do so.

=== Dissenting opinion ===
Justice Neil Gorsuch was the sole dissenter in this case. Gorsuch argued that the retroactive application of the Minnesota law violated the Contract Clause. First, he claimed that the changing of beneficiaries in such a retroactive manner was a substantial impairment on the policy holder. Second, he wrote that Minnesota could have used a much less intrusive method of reaching their goal, such as requiring the divorce court to confirm beneficiary designation before a dissolution is finalized.

Gorsuch also argued that the court's decision introduced a paradox. He wrote that the majority upheld the law partly on the basis that it could be easily undone, "yet the Court just finished telling us the statute is justified because most policyholders neglect their beneficiary designations after divorce. Both claims cannot be true."
