= List of United States Supreme Court cases, volume 584 =

This is a list of all the United States Supreme Court cases from volume 584 of the United States Reports:

Case name	Docket no.	Date decided
Marinello v. United States	16–1144	March 21, 2018
To convict a defendant under the Internal Revenue Code's Omnibus Clause, the Government must prove the defendant was aware of a pending tax-related proceeding, such as a particular investigation or audit, or could reasonably foresee that such a proceeding would commence.
Ayestas v. Davis	16–6795	March 21, 2018
An ex parte decision by a judge can still be judicial in nature.
Hall v. Hall	16–1150	March 27, 2018
When one of several cases consolidated under Federal Rule of Civil Procedure 42(a) is finally decided, that decision confers upon the losing party the immediate right to appeal, regardless of whether any of the other consolidated cases remain pending.
Encino Motorcars, LLC v. Navarro	16–1362	April 2, 2018
Automotive service advisors are considered exempt from overtime pay under the Fair Labor Standards Act, reversing the decision of the Ninth Circuit
Kisela v. Hughes	17–467	April 2, 2018
The officer was entitled to qualified immunity after shooting a person less than one minute into their interaction.
Wilson v. Sellers	16–6855	April 17, 2018
A federal court sitting in a habeas corpus proceeding should "look through" an unexplained, summary ruling to the last related state-court decision that provides a relevant rationale and presume that the unexplained decision adopted the same reasoning. The State may rebut the presumption by showing that the unexplained decision most likely relied on different grounds than the reasoned decision below.
Sessions v. Dimaya	15–1498	April 17, 2018
18 U.S.C. § 16(b), a statute defining certain "aggravated felonies", is unconstitutionally vague.
United States v. Microsoft Corp.	17–2	April 17, 2018
Second Circuit vacated and remanded after the controversy was mooted by passage of the CLOUD Act (March 2018).
Jesner v. Arab Bank, PLC	16–499	April 24, 2018
Foreign corporations may not be sued under the Alien Tort Statute in U.S. courts.
Oil States Energy Services, LLC v. Greene’s Energy Group, LLC	16–712	April 24, 2018
The inter partes review process granted by Congress to the United States Patent and Trademark Office is constitutional.
SAS Institute Inc. v. Iancu	16–969	April 24, 2018
The United States Patent and Trademark Office, when conducting an inter partes review, must make judgement on all patent claims contested by the petitioner.
United States v. Sanchez-Gomez	17–312	May 14, 2018
There is no analog to class actions under the Federal Rules of Criminal Procedure, and there is no "capable of repetition yet evading review" exception for mootness where repetition would require the defendant to be charged with a crime in the future.
Byrd v. United States	16–1371	May 14, 2018
Drivers of rental cars have rights protecting them from unconstitutional searches by police, even if the drivers are not listed on the rental agreement.
McCoy v. Louisiana	16–8255	May 14, 2018
The Sixth Amendment guarantees a defendant the right to choose the objective of his defense and to insist that his counsel refrain from admitting guilt, even when counsel's experienced-based view is that confessing guilt offers the defendant the best chance to avoid the death penalty.
Dahda v. United States	17–43	May 14, 2018
Because the wiretap orders did not lack any information that the statute required them to include and would have been sufficient absent the superfluous language authorizing interception outside the court's territorial jurisdiction, the orders were not facially insufficient.
Murphy v. National Collegiate Athletic Association	16–476	May 14, 2018
The provision of the Professional and Amateur Sports Protection Act that prohibits state authorization of schemes in sports gambling conflicts with the anticommandeering rule of the Tenth Amendment to the Constitution of the United States of America.
Epic Systems Corp. v. Lewis	16–285	May 21, 2018
Congress has instructed in the Federal Arbitration Act that arbitration agreements providing for individualized proceedings must be enforced and neither saving clause of the Act nor the National Labor Relations Act of 1935 suggests otherwise.
Upper Skagit Tribe v. Lundgren	17–387	May 21, 2018
Yakima County v. Yakima Nation did not address the scope of Native Nations' sovereign immunity for in rem lawsuits.
Lagos v. United States	16–1519	May 29, 2018
The words "investigation" and "proceedings" in the Mandatory Victims Restitution Act are limited to government investigations and criminal proceedings and do not include private investigations and civil or bankruptcy proceedings.
Collins v. Virginia	16–1027	May 29, 2018
The Fourth Amendment's motor vehicle exception for a warrantless search based on reasonable cause does not apply to vehicles stored within a person's home or its curtilage.
City of Hays v. Vogt	16–1495	May 29, 2018
Dismissed as improvidently granted.
Masterpiece Cakeshop v. Colorado Civil Rights Commission	16–111	June 4, 2018
By failing to act in a manner neutral to religion, the Colorado Civil Rights Commission violated the First Amendment to the United States Constitution.
Hughes v. United States	17–155	June 4, 2018
A sentence imposed pursuant to a plea agreement under Federal Rule of Criminal Procedure 11(c)(1)(C) is "based on" the defendant's Guidelines range so long as that range was part of the framework the district court relied on in imposing the sentence or accepting the agreement.
Koons v. United States	17–5716	June 4, 2018
A person who has been sentenced based on a mandatory minimum sentence with a statutory justification for a longer sentence, rather a justification within the Guidelines, is not entitled to sentence reductions under subsequent amendments to the Guidelines.
Lamar, Archer & Cofrin, LLP v. Appling	16–1215	June 4, 2018
A debtor's statement about a single asset can be a "statement respecting the debtor’s financial condition" under the Bankruptcy Code's exceptions to discharge; therefore, debt associated with a single-asset statement that is not in writing may be discharged.
Azar v. Garza	17–654	June 4, 2018
Judgment below should be vacated and remanded with a direction to dismiss when a federal civil case has become moot while on its way to the Supreme Court.
China Agritech, Inc. v. Resh	17–432	June 11, 2018
Upon denial of class certification, a putative class member may not, in lieu of promptly joining an existing suit or promptly filing an individual action, commence a class action anew beyond the time allowed by the applicable statute of limitations.
Husted v. A. Philip Randolph Institute	16–980	June 11, 2018
Both the National Voter Registration Act of 1993 and the Help America Vote Act of 2002, as prescribed by law in 52 U.S.C. § 20507, permit Ohio to have a list-maintenance process that removes people from the state's on the basis of inactivity.
Sveen v. Melin	16–1432	June 11, 2018
A law providing that the dissolution or annulment of a marriage revokes any revocable beneficiary designation made by a person to the person's former spouse does not violate the Contracts Clause.
Washington v. United States	17–269	June 11, 2018
Lower court upheld by divided Court.
