= Joseph Grundfest =

American academic

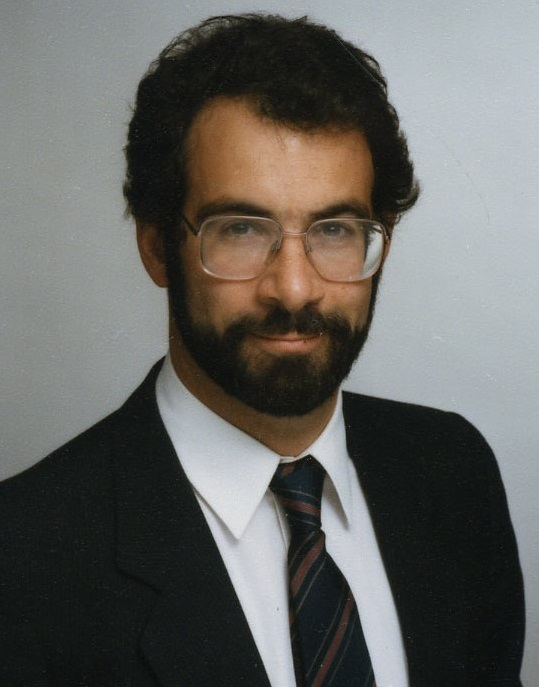
- 1985

Personal details
- Born: October 8, 1951 (age 74) New York City
- Education: Yale University; London School of Economics; Stanford Law School

Joseph Grundfest (born 1951) is an American academic. He was the William A. Franke Professor of Law and Business at Stanford Law School and co-director of the Rock Center on Corporate Governance at Stanford University. He joined Stanford's faculty in 1990 after having served for more than four years as a Commissioner of the United States Securities and Exchange Commission, a position to which he was appointed by President Ronald Reagan.

Grundfest’s scholarship in the areas of corporate law, securities regulation, and litigation has been published in the Harvard, Yale, and Stanford Law Reviews. The National Law Journal lists Grundfest as among the nation’s 100 most influential attorneys, and California Lawyer has listed Grundfest as among the top 10 lawyers in California. Prior to joining the SEC, Grundfest served as counsel and senior economist for legal and regulatory matters at the President’s Council of Economic Advisors. An attorney and economist, Grundfest has also practiced law with Wilmer, Cutler & Pickering, and has served as an economist with the Brookings Institution and the Rand Corporation.

== Early life and education ==
Grundfest was born in New York City on October 8, 1951. He graduated from Stuyvesant High School in 1969, and holds a bachelor's degree in economics from Yale University (1973) and completed the M.Sc. program in mathematical economics and econometrics at the London School of Economics (1972). His J.D. degree is from Stanford (1978) where he also completed all requirements for a doctorate in economics but for the dissertation (1978).

== Career ==
Grundfest is founder and director of Directors’ College at Stanford Law School, and principal investigator for Stanford Law School’s Securities Class Action Clearinghouse. He has served on the New York Stock Exchange’s Legal Advisory Board, on the NASDAQ Legal Advisory Committee, on a rules committee of the United States District Court for the Northern District of California, and has been elected to membership in the American Law Institute. Grundfest has been selected as a National Fellow by the Hoover Institution, has been awarded a John M. Olin Faculty Fellowship, and is an Adjunct Scholar of the American Enterprise Institute. Grundfest is admitted to practice in California and in the District of Columbia.

In 1996, Grundfest co-founded Financial Engines (NASDAQ: FNGN) with Stanford Professor William F. Sharpe and Silicon Valley lawyer Craig W. Johnson.

Today, Financial Engines has over 200 employees and is the leader in automated retirement plan investment advice and management, with more than $200 Billion in managed retirement accounts, providing advice and managed account services to employees in over 1000 major corporations. In March, 2018, Financial Engines was acquired for $3 Billion in cash

Grundfest has twice received the John Bingham Hurlbut Award for Excellence in Teaching as well as the Associated Students of Stanford University award as the best professor at the Stanford Law, Business, and Medical Schools. Grundfest is chairman of the board nominating committee of the NASDAQ Stock Market, and was formerly a director of Oracle Corporation.

He was a member of the special litigation committee in the 2003 case In Re Oracle Corp. Derivative Litigation, 824 A.2d 917. Grundfest's independence, as a member of the special litigation committee, was particularly scrutinized by the Delaware Chancery Court because of Oracle's ties to Grundfest's alma mater and employer, Stanford University. 824 A.2d 917, 946.

In 2010 Grundfest filed an affidavit with the US District Court in SEC v. Bank of America Corporation (No. 1-09-cv-06829), complaint under cause of action of Securities Fraud. At the onset of the litigation SEC and Bank of America Corporation filed with the Court a proposed settlement for $33 million. Grundfest's affidavit supported the Settlement Agreement then before the Court, which was eventually rejected.

In September 2019, Grundfest put forth a solution to deal with the impact of Cyan, Inc. v. Beaver County Employees Retirement Fund which ruled that plaintiffs could bring Section 11 suits in state courts and not just in federal courts, in which he suggested that companies could add federal forum provisions (FFPs) to their charter documents to the effect that plaintiffs could only bring Section 11 Suits in federal court. However, the Delaware Court of Chancery ruled in December 2018 that FFPs were ineffective under Delaware ruling in Sciabacucchi v Salzberg. Defendants filed appeal with the Delaware Supreme court, supported by Grundfest's detailed paper, and were successful.

== External sources ==
- Stanford CV dated 2003.
- SEC bio 2007.
