= Texas v. New Mexico and Colorado =

- Supreme Court of the United States

Argued January 8, 2018 Decided March 5, 2018
- Full case name: Texas v. New Mexico and Colorado
- Docket no.: 22O141
- Citations: 583 U.S. ___ (more) 583 U.S. 407; 138 S.Ct. 954
- Argument: Oral argument

Holding
- Maryland v. Louisiana (1981) holds that the federal government has the right to intervene in legal cases regarding certain interstate compacts. In this case, the Court ruled that the Rio Grande Compact qualifies as a fitting compact because it relates to "distinctively federal interests".

Court membership
- Chief Justice John Roberts Associate Justices Anthony Kennedy · Clarence Thomas; Ruth Bader Ginsburg · Stephen Breyer; Samuel Alito · Sonia Sotomayor; Elena Kagan · Neil Gorsuch

Case opinion
- Majority: Gorsuch, joined by unanimous

Texas v. New Mexico and Colorado, 583 U.S. ___ (2018), was a Supreme Court case argued and decided during the 2017 term of the Supreme Court of the United States. The case involved an interstate dispute regarding New Mexico's compliance with the Rio Grande Compact of 1938, an agreement which established a plan for equitable apportionment of the water in the Rio Grande Basin among the states of Colorado, New Mexico, and Texas. The Court considered the question of whether the U.S. federal government had a legal right to join litigation against New Mexico; the Court ruled that the federal government was within its rights when it did so.

== Background ==
=== The Rio Grande Compact ===
The interstate agreement at the center of the case, the Rio Grande Compact, arose from multiple concerns about water apportionment in the early 20th century. According to the terms of the Convention Between the United States and Mexico for the Equitable Distribution of the Waters of the Rio Grande for Irrigation Purposes, a treaty that the United States signed with Mexico in 1906, the U.S. must supply Mexico with at least 60,000 acre-feet of water from the Rio Grande each year. As part of its efforts to develop the arid American West through the Newlands Reclamation Act and the Rio Grande Project, the federal government began construction of the Elephant Butte Reservoir in New Mexico to reserve a large amount of water for transference to Mexican officials; the reservoir was completed in 1916 and soon found additional use supplying farmers in New Mexico and Texas with water for irrigation of their crops. However, a lack of regulation regarding water apportionment between the states caused tension between Colorado, New Mexico, and Texas, leading them to sign the Rio Grande Compact in March 1938, which committed all three states to equal division of the Rio Grande's water supplies above a point in Fort Quitman, Texas.

=== Interstate Conflict ===
In early 2014, the state of Texas sued New Mexico, formally accusing it of allowing the water reserves of the Rio Grande to be discreetly diverted for use within New Mexico and of depriving Texas of its equal share of the river's resources. Asserting that the violation was an injury to the general interests of the United States, the federal government followed suit and filed a complaint against New Mexico the same year, which raised the question of whether the federal government had the legal right to intervene in matters regarding the relevant type of interstate compact. The Supreme Court agreed to hear the case on October 10, 2017, despite a Special Master's recommendation that the Court reject a hearing of the federal government's complaints on the grounds that the Rio Grande Compact and subsequent federal legislation did not grant the federal government enforcement powers related to the compact.

=== Question presented ===
The key question of the case was "May the United States properly intervene in an action involving a dispute over a compact between states?"

== Ruling ==
The case was argued before the Supreme Court on January 8, 2018, and decided on March 5 of the same year. Justice Neil Gorsuch delivered the Court's unanimous opinion, holding that the federal government has the right to join suits in matters related to interstate compacts provided that the compacts at hand are directly related to the operations and obligations of the federal government. The opinion cites the precedent set in Maryland v. Louisiana (1981) that the United States sometimes has the right to intervene in interstate compacts and clarifies this right by adding that, for intervention to be allowed, the dispute must be clearly related to "distinctively federal interests".

=== Rationale ===
The Court ruled that adherence to the Rio Grande Compact is of direct relevance to the interests of the federal government for three distinct reasons:

1. The terms of the Rio Grande Compact are fundamentally linked to the operations of the Rio Grande Project, a federal program.
2. The federal government is significantly involved in the functions of the compact and the coordination of its details.
3. The federal government relies upon the proper operation of the compact to fulfill its treaty commitments to the government of Mexico.

The Court also noted that it had been assisted in its decision by a fourth consideration: the federal government's joining an existing complaint filed by the State of Texas, one of the parties to the Rio Grande Compact, and Texas's failure to object to the federal government's intervention.

Since these first three factors demonstrate the Rio Grande Compact's relation to "distinctively federal interests" and since the fourth demonstrates that federal intervention occurred with the tacit consent of Texas, the case's original petitioner, the Court ruled that the federal government did have the right to intervene and join Texas as a plaintiff against New Mexico.

== Legacy ==
Notably, the justices chose not to rule on whether the federal government has the right to initiate a unique suit regarding compliance with interstate compact law. Because of this, the question of whether the federal government can legally intervene in interstate compact law by initiating its own suit (without any existing suits filed by states or without the consent of the states involved in the relevant compact) remains unanswered.

Moreover, the Court chose not to rule on New Mexico's compliance with the Rio Grande Compact during this case, so the issue of water apportionment in the Elephant Butte Reservoir will remain unresolved until such time that the Court chooses to address the question in a future case. However, the Court's subsequent ruling in Florida v. Georgia, a case involving water distribution between the states of Georgia and Florida, established a lower standard of proof in which Florida must only prove "harm" from unequal apportionment for its case to be considered. If the Court continues to apply it for apportionment cases in the future, which is likely according to the assessment of Todd Votteler, the head of Collaborative Water Resolution LLC, this new standard will almost certainly prove advantageous to Texas in its ongoing case against New Mexico.
