= Merit Management Group, LP v. FTI Consulting, Inc. =

- Supreme Court of the United States

Decided February 27, 2018
- Full case name: Merit Management Group, LP v. FTI Consulting, Inc.
- Docket no.: 16-784
- Citations: 583 U.S. ___ (more)

Holding
- The only relevant transfer for purposes of the Bankruptcy Code's Section 546(e) safe harbor is the transfer that the trustee seeks to avoid.

Court membership
- Chief Justice John Roberts Associate Justices Anthony Kennedy · Clarence Thomas; Ruth Bader Ginsburg · Stephen Breyer; Samuel Alito · Sonia Sotomayor; Elena Kagan · Neil Gorsuch

Case opinion
- Majority: Sotomayor, joined by unanimous

Laws applied
- Bankruptcy Code

Merit Management Group, LP v. FTI Consulting, Inc., 583 U.S. ___ (2018), was a United States Supreme Court case in which the court held that the only relevant transfer for purposes of the Bankruptcy Code's Section 546(e) safe harbor is the transfer that the trustee seeks to avoid.

== Background ==
The Bankruptcy Code allows trustees to set aside and recover certain transfers for the benefit of the bankruptcy estate, including, under Section 548(a), certain fraudulent transfers "of an interest of the debtor in property." It also sets out a number of limits on the exercise of these avoiding powers. Central here is the securities safe harbor in Section 546(e), which, among other things, provides that "the trustee may not avoid a transfer that is a... settlement payment... made by or to (or for the benefit of) a... financial institution... or that is a transfer made by or to (or for the benefit of) a... financial institution... in connection with a securities contract."

Valley View Downs, LP, and Bedford Downs Management Corp. entered into an agreement under which Valley View, if it got the last harness-racing license in Pennsylvania, would purchase all of Bedford Downs' stock for $55 million. Valley View was granted the license and arranged for the Cayman Islands branch of Credit Suisse to wire $55 million to third-party escrow agent Citizens Bank of Pennsylvania. The Bedford Downs shareholders, including petitioner Merit Management Group, LP, deposited their stock certificates into escrow. Citizens Bank disbursed the $55 million over two installments according to the agreement, of which petitioner Merit received $16.5 million.

Although Valley View secured the harness-racing license, it was unable to achieve its goal of opening a racetrack casino. Valley View and its parent company, Centaur, LLC, filed for Chapter 11 bankruptcy. Respondent FTI Consulting, Inc., was appointed to serve as trustee of the Centaur litigation trust. FTI then sought to avoid the transfer from Valley View to Merit for the sale of Bedford Downs's stock, arguing that it was constructively fraudulent under Section 548(a)(1)(B). Merit contended that the Section 546(e) safe harbor barred FTI from avoiding the transfer because it was a "settlement payment... made by or to (or for the benefit of)" two "financial institutions," Credit Suisse and Citizens Bank. The federal district court agreed with Merit, but the Seventh Circuit Court of Appeals reversed, holding that Section 546(e) did not protect transfers in which financial institutions served as mere conduits.

== Opinion of the court ==
The Supreme Court issued a majority opinion by Justice Sonia Sotomayor on February 27, 2018. The decision was unanimous.
