= National Association of Manufacturers v. Department of Defense =

- Supreme Court of the United States

Argued October 11, 2017 Decided January 22, 2018
- Full case name: National Association of Manufacturers, Petitioner v. Department of Defense, et al.
- Docket no.: 16-299
- Citations: 583 U.S. ___ (more) 138 S. Ct. 617; 199 L. Ed. 2d 501

Case history
- Prior: Murray Energy Corp. v. Department of Defense, 817 F.3d 261 (6th Cir. 2016); cert. granted, 137 S. Ct. 811 (2017).

Holding
- Challenges to the Environmental Protection Agency's Waters of the United States Rule must be filed in federal district courts.

Court membership
- Chief Justice John Roberts Associate Justices Anthony Kennedy · Clarence Thomas; Ruth Bader Ginsburg · Stephen Breyer; Samuel Alito · Sonia Sotomayor; Elena Kagan · Neil Gorsuch

Case opinion
- Majority: Sotomayor, joined by unanimous

Laws applied
- Clean Water Act

National Association of Manufacturers v. Department of Defense, 583 U.S. ___ (2018), is a United States Supreme Court case in which the court held that challenges to the Environmental Protection Agency's Waters of the United States (WOTUS) Rule must be filed in federal district courts. The case is the successor to North Dakota v. EPA, among others.

== Facts and prior history ==
The Clean Water Act generally prohibits "the discharge of any pollutant by any person," except in express circumstances. A "discharge of a pollutant" includes "any addition of any pollutant to navigable waters from any point source," and the statutory term "navigable waters," in turn, means "the waters of the United States." Section §1311(a) contains exceptions to the general prohibition on discharge of pollutants, including two permitting schemes that authorize certain entities to discharge pollutants into navigable waters: the National Pollutant Discharge Elimination System (NPDES) program administered by the Environmental Protection Agency (EPA) and a program administered by the Army Corps of Engineers (Corps).

The statutory term "waters of the United States" delineates the geographic reach of those permitting programs as well as other substantive provisions of the Act. In 2015, the EPA and the Corps proffered a definition of that term through an agency regulation dubbed the Waters of the United States Rule (WOTUS Rule or Rule). The WOTUS Rule "imposes no enforceable duty on any state, local, or tribal governments, or the private sector." As stated in its preamble, the Rule "does not establish any regulatory requirements" and is instead "a definitional rule that clarifies the scope of" the statutory term "waters of the United States." Id., at 37054.

There are two principal avenues of judicial review of an EPA action. Generally, parties may file challenges to final EPA actions in federal district courts, typically under the Administrative Procedure Act. But the Clean Water Act enumerates seven categories of EPA actions for which review lies directly and exclusively in the federal courts of appeals, including EPA actions "approving or promulgating any effluent limitation or other limitation under section 1311, 1312, 1316, or 1345," and EPA actions "issuing or denying any permit under section 1342."

Several parties, including the National Association of Manufacturers (NAM), challenged the Rule in United States District Courts across the country. Many parties, but not NAM, filed "protective" petitions for review in various Courts of Appeals to preserve their challenges should their district court lawsuits be dismissed for lack of jurisdiction. The circuit-court actions were consolidated and transferred to the Court of Appeals for the Sixth Circuit. Meanwhile, the parallel actions in the district courts continued. NAM intervened as a respondent in the Sixth Circuit and, along with several other parties, moved to dismiss for lack of jurisdiction. The Government opposed those motions, arguing that the challenges must be brought first in the Court of Appeals. The Sixth Circuit denied the motions to dismiss.

== Opinion of the Court ==
The Court heard oral arguments on October 11, 2017.

The Court issued an opinion on January 22, 2018. Associate Justice Sonia Sotomayor authored the unanimous opinion of the Court.
