= Rubin v. Islamic Republic of Iran =

- Supreme Court of the United States

Argued December 4, 2017 Decided February 21, 2018
- Full case name: Jenny Rubin, et al. v. Islamic Republic of Iran, et al.
- Docket no.: 16-534
- Citations: 583 U.S. ___ (more) 138 S. Ct. 816; 200 L. Ed. 2d 58

Case history
- Prior: 830 F.3d 470 (7th Cir. 2016); cert. granted, 137 S. Ct. 2326 (2017).

Holding
- Section 1610(g) of the Foreign Sovereign Immunities Act does not provide a freestanding basis for parties holding a judgment under § 1605A to attach and execute against the property of a foreign state; rather, for § 1610(g) to apply, the immunity of the property at issue must be rescinded under a separate provision within § 1610. Seventh Circuit affirmed.

Court membership
- Chief Justice John Roberts Associate Justices Anthony Kennedy · Clarence Thomas; Ruth Bader Ginsburg · Stephen Breyer; Samuel Alito · Sonia Sotomayor; Elena Kagan · Neil Gorsuch

Case opinion
- Majority: Sotomayor, joined by Roberts, Kennedy, Thomas, Ginsburg, Breyer, Alito, Gorsuch
- Kagan took no part in the consideration or decision of the case.

Laws applied
- 28 U.S.C. § 1604, et seq. (Foreign Sovereign Immunities Act)

Rubin v. Islamic Republic of Iran, 583 U.S. ___ (2018), was a United States Supreme Court case brought against the state of Iran by the families of American victims of the Ben Yehuda Street bombings which occurred in September 1997. Under the Foreign Sovereign Immunities Act of 1976, nations cannot typically be sued unless the state can be proved to have provided support for terrorists or acts of terrorism. After a district judge ruled Iran owed $71.5 million to the families of the victims, the families brought several cases to court in an attempt to attach and execute on assets owned by the state of Iran located in the United States.

Under subsections (a) and (g) of 28 U.S.C. § 1610, attachment and execution on the property of a foreign state is permissible provided that it is being used for "a commercial activity in the United States". However, the items in question in this particular case—ancient Persian artifacts held for study by the University of Chicago Oriental Institute and the Field Museum (both of whom were sued by Rubin et al.) were not in use by the state of Iran, and therefore could not be executed upon, as ruled by both the district court and Seventh Circuit. A unanimous (Kagan did not participate) opinion was delivered by Justice Sotomayor upholding the judgment that the ancient artifacts cannot be seized, ruling that exceptions to the Foreign Sovereign Immunities Act did not apply in this case.

The United States filed an amicus curiae brief in support of Iran, writing: "The property at issue here consists of ancient Persian artifacts, documenting a unique aspect of Iran's cultural heritage, that were lent to a U.S. institution in the 1930s for academic study....Execution against such unique cultural artifacts could cause affront and reciprocity problems."

== See also ==
- Lists of United States Supreme Court cases
- Lists of United States Supreme Court cases by volume
- List of United States Supreme Court cases by the Roberts Court
