= Rio Grande Compact =

Interstate water rights agreement in the southwest United States

The Rio Grande Compact is an interstate compact signed in 1938 in the United States between the states of Colorado, New Mexico, and Texas, and approved by the United States Congress, to equitably apportion the waters of the Rio Grande Basin.

== Passage ==
The treaty was ratified by Colorado's legislature on February 21, 1939, then by Texas and New Mexico's legislatures on March 1. It was finally adopted on December 19, 1939, after passing through Congress (as Public Act No. 96, 76) and being signed into law on May 31, 1939.

The act was amended at the thirteenth Annual Meeting, on February 25, 1952.

== Summary ==
Colorado is committed to delivering a certain amount of water to the New Mexico state line, based on water runoff as measured at four index stations located in the area of the Rio Grande's headwaters. The compact provides for an indexed schedule of required water deliveries from Colorado, based on gauged stream flows, and, under certain circumstances, a system of debits and credits in water deliveries that also permits water storage with the combined capacity of Elephant Butte and Caballo Reservoirs.

The compact also sets a minimum quality standard, as if Colorado was to construct water projects later for delivering water into the Rio Grande from the Closed Basin, the state would not be credited with the water delivered unless the sodium ions in the water do not exceed 45% of the total positive ions when the total dissolved solids in the water exceeds 350ppm.

== Results ==
Between 1939 and 1966, Colorado virtually ignored the compact. The result was that by 1966, due to Colorado's non-compliance with the Compact, Colorado owed New Mexico one-million acre feet (1.2 km^{3}) of water, and New Mexico owed Texas 500,000 acre-feet (620,000,000 m^{3}). New Mexico and Texas collectively sued Colorado to compel compliance, and between 1966 and 1967, the case progressed and was eventually heard by the Supreme Court of the United States.

In 1985, after several years of abundant water flow from the Rio Grande, the Elephant Butte and Caballo reservoirs reached capacity, having received more water than they could hold. The terms of the Compact state that once the Elephant Butte reservoir is filled, New Mexico and Colorado are immediately released from any water debt they have accrued. Colorado's debt to New Mexico at the time, 500,000 acre-feet (620,000,000 m^{3}) of water was immediately cleared, settling the balance between the two states but leaving New Mexico in an unfortunate position regarding its debt to Texas.

In 1996, when the reservoir was again close to capacity, the New Mexico water districts below Elephant Butte authorized drawing down the reservoir and dumping the water in the New Mexico desert to prevent spilling and to again clear Colorado's water debt.

The stress now is on New Mexico to meet its obligations to Texas. During drier years, New Mexico will be short about 80,000 acre-feet (99,000,000 m^{3}) in its obligations, due to evaporation of reservoir water before New Mexico can absorb it.

== Compliance ==
The Rio Grande Compact Commission, located in El Paso, Texas, administers the Rio Grande Compact. An employee of the USGS New Mexico Water Science Center serves as Secretary to the Compact. The principal duty of the Secretary is to compile streamflow and storage data used in the commission's Engineer Advisers' annual accounting computations. The Secretary also compiles monthly provisional streamflow and storage data, distributes them to interested parties, and compiles and publishes an annual data report for the commission.

The Texas Commission on Environmental Quality is Texas's representation to the commission.

== Environmental issues ==
During a 1999 United States House of Representatives investigation of interstate water pacts, Bennett W. Raley offered testimony revealing that efforts to comply with the demands of the compact could be threatening a critical habitat for the Rio Grande Silvery Minnow.

== See also ==
- Colorado River Compact (1922)
- List of rivers in New Mexico
- Texas v. New Mexico and Colorado, interstate dispute regarding New Mexico's compliance with the Rio Grande Compact.

== Sources ==
- Rio Grande Compact (1938), Colorado State Water Knowledge web site
- Text of the Compact
- Rio Grande Compact Commission, TCEQ site
- USGS summary
- Compact drives the ties that bind, Alamosa Valley News, November 21, 2001
- Economic Aspects of Water in New Mexico, Micha Gisser
- Rio Grande Compact Accounting, New Mexico Texas Water Commission Management Advisory Committee, November 15, 2002
- Rio Grande Basin Analysis
