= List of United States Supreme Court cases, volume 583 =

This is a list of all the United States Supreme Court cases from volume 583 of the United States Reports:

Case name	Docket no.	Date decided
Kernan v. Cuero	16–1468	November 6, 2017
"Federal law" as interpreted by the Supreme Court has not clearly established that someone who pleads guilty to one set of charges is not entitled to specific performance of the sentence under those charges if the prosecution later amends the charges in a way that increased the expected sentence. The court did not resolve any questions in this case.
Dunn v. Madison	17–193	November 6, 2017
Neither Ford v. Wainwright nor Panetti v. Quarterman "clearly established" that a prisoner is incompetent to be executed because of a failure to remember that they committed the crime, as distinct from a failure to rationally comprehend the concepts of crime and punishment as applied in their case.
Hamer v. Neighborhood Housing Serv.	16–658	November 8, 2017
Federal Rule of Appellate Procedure 4(a)(5)(C)'s limitation on extensions of time to file a notice of appeal is a court-made rule and not jurisdictional.
In re United States	17–801	December 20, 2017
Vacated an order requiring the federal government to complete the administrative record filed in a proceeding brought to prevent the repeal of the Deferred Action for Childhood Arrivals (DACA) program.
Tharpe v. Sellers	17–6075	January 8, 2018
Reversed a denial of a certificate of appealability in a case where the defendant presented evidence that a juror's racial prejudice affected the juror's vote for the death penalty.
District of Columbia v. Wesby	15–1485	January 22, 2018
The officers had probable cause to arrest the partygoers and were entitled to qualified immunity.
Artis v. District of Columbia	16–460	January 22, 2018
The limitations period for state claims filed in federal court is suspended while such claims are pending in federal court and for 30 days after dismissal by the federal court.
Nat'l Ass'n of Manufacturers v. Dept of Defense	16–299	January 22, 2018
Challenges to the Environmental Protection Agency's Waters of the United States Rule must be filed in federal district courts.
CNH Industrial N.V. v. Reese	17–515	February 20, 2018
When a collective bargaining agreement contains a durational clause, the clause cannot be found to be ambiguous based only on a presumption that such agreements provide lifetime vesting of healthcare benefits for retirees.
Montana v. Wyoming	Orig/ 137, Orig	February 20, 2018
Judgment is awarded against the State of Wyoming and in favor of the State of Montana for violations of the Yellowstone River Compact resulting from Wyoming’s reduction of the volume of water available in the Tongue River at the State line between Wyoming and Montana by 1300 acre feet in 2004 and 56 acre feet in 2006.
Digital Realty Tr., Inc. v. Somers	16–1276	February 21, 2018
"Whistleblower" status and associated protections as defined by Sarbanes-Oxley and Dodd-Frank only apply in cases where the whistleblower has reported malfeasance directly to the Securities and Exchange Commission.
Class v. United States	16–424	February 21, 2018
A guilty plea, by itself, does not bar a federal criminal defendant from challenging the constitutionality of his statute of conviction on direct appeal.
Rubin v. Islamic Republic of Iran	16–534	February 21, 2018
Section 1610(g) of the Foreign Sovereign Immunities Act does not provide a freestanding basis for parties holding a judgment under § 1605A to attach and execute against the property of a foreign state; rather, for § 1610(g) to apply, the immunity of the property at issue must be rescinded under a separate provision within § 1610. Seventh Circuit affirmed.
Murphy v. Smith	16–1067	February 21, 2018
An incarcerated person who is awarded attorney's fees in connection to their successful civil rights case must contribute up to 25% of their own winnings to paying that award.
Patchak v. Zinke	16–498	February 27, 2018
The Gun Lake Trust Land Reaffirmation Act, which precludes federal courts from hearing lawsuits involving a particular parcel of land, does not violate Article III.
Jennings v. Rodriguez	15–1204	February 27, 2018
Detained immigrants do not have a statutory right to periodic bond hearings.
Merit Management Group, LP v. FTI Consulting, Inc.	16–784	February 27, 2018
The only relevant transfer for purposes of the Bankruptcy Code's Section 546(e) safe harbor is the transfer that the trustee seeks to avoid.
U.S. Bank N.A. v. Village at Lakeridge, LLC	15–1509	March 5, 2018
Clear error is the proper standard for review of a determination that a purchaser was not a non-statutory insider for purposes of approving a cramdown plan of reorganization.
Texas v. New Mexico and Colorado	583 U.S. 407	March 5, 2018
Maryland v. Louisiana (1981) holds that the federal government has the right to intervene in legal cases regarding certain interstate compacts. In this case, the Court held that the Rio Grande Compact qualifies as a fitting compact because it relates to "distinctively federal interests".
Cyan, Inc. v. Beaver Cnty. Employees Retirement Fund	15–1439	March 20, 2018
The Securities Litigation Uniform Standards Act of 1998 did not strip state courts of jurisdiction to adjudicate class actions alleging only 1933 Securities Act violations; nor did it authorize removing such suits from state to federal court.
