= CNH Industrial N.V. v. Reese =

- Supreme Court of the United States

Decided February 20, 2018
- Full case name: CNH Industrial N.V. v. Reese
- Docket no.: 17-515
- Citations: 583 U.S. ___ (more)

Holding
- When a collective bargaining agreement contains a durational clause, the clause cannot be found to be ambiguous based only on a presumption that such agreements provide lifetime vesting of healthcare benefits for retirees.

Court membership
- Chief Justice John Roberts Associate Justices Anthony Kennedy · Clarence Thomas; Ruth Bader Ginsburg · Stephen Breyer; Samuel Alito · Sonia Sotomayor; Elena Kagan · Neil Gorsuch

Case opinion
- Per curiam

CNH Industrial N.V. v. Reese, 583 U.S. ___ (2018), was a United States Supreme Court case in which the court held that when a collective bargaining agreement contains a durational clause, the clause cannot be found to be ambiguous based only on a presumption that such agreements provide lifetime vesting of healthcare benefits for retirees.
