= Hamer v. Neighborhood Housing Services of Chicago =

- Supreme Court of the United States

Argued October 10, 2017 Decided November 8, 2017
- Full case name: Hamer v. Neighborhood Housing Services of Chicago, et al.
- Docket no.: 16-658
- Citations: 583 U.S. ___ (more) 138 S. Ct. 13; 199 L. Ed. 2d 249

Case history
- Prior: 835 F.3d 761 (7th Cir. 2016)

Holding
- Federal Rule of Appellate Procedure 4(a)(5)(C)'s limitation on extensions of time to file a notice of appeal is a court-made rule and not jurisdictional.

Court membership
- Chief Justice John Roberts Associate Justices Anthony Kennedy · Clarence Thomas; Ruth Bader Ginsburg · Stephen Breyer; Samuel Alito · Sonia Sotomayor; Elena Kagan · Neil Gorsuch

Case opinion
- Majority: Ginsburg, joined by unanimous

Laws applied
- Fed. R. App. P. 4(a)(5)(C)

Hamer v. Neighborhood Housing Services of Chicago, 583 U.S. ___ (2017), was a United States Supreme Court case in which the court held that Federal Rule of Appellate Procedure 4(a)(5)(C)'s limitation on extensions of time to file a notice of appeal is a court-made rule and not jurisdictional. As such, a failure to comply with the deadline for filing a notice of appeal does not require dismissal of a case.

== Background ==
An appeal filing deadline prescribed by statute is considered "jurisdictional," meaning that late filing of the appeal notice requires the dismissal of the appeal. In contrast, a time limit prescribed only in a court-made rule is not jurisdictional. It is a mandatory claim-processing rule that may be waived or forfeited. Courts often apply this distinction inconsistently.

Charmaine Hamer filed an employment discrimination suit against respondents. The district court granted the defendants' motion for summary judgment, entering final judgment on September 14, 2015. Before October 14, the date Hamer's notice of appeal was due, her attorneys filed a motion to withdraw as counsel and a motion for an extension of the appeal filing deadline to give Hamer time to secure new counsel. The district court granted both motions, extending the deadline to December 14, a two-month extension, even though the governing Federal Rule of Appellate Procedure, Rule 4(a)(5)(C), confines such extensions to 30 days. Concluding that Rule 4(a)(5)(C)'s time prescription is jurisdictional, the Court of Appeals dismissed Hamer's appeal.
