= Rio Grande =

Major river forming part of the United States and Mexico border

Rio Grande Río Bravo del Norte (in Spanish), Tooh Ba'áadii (in Navajo), Kótsoi (in Jicarilla Apache)
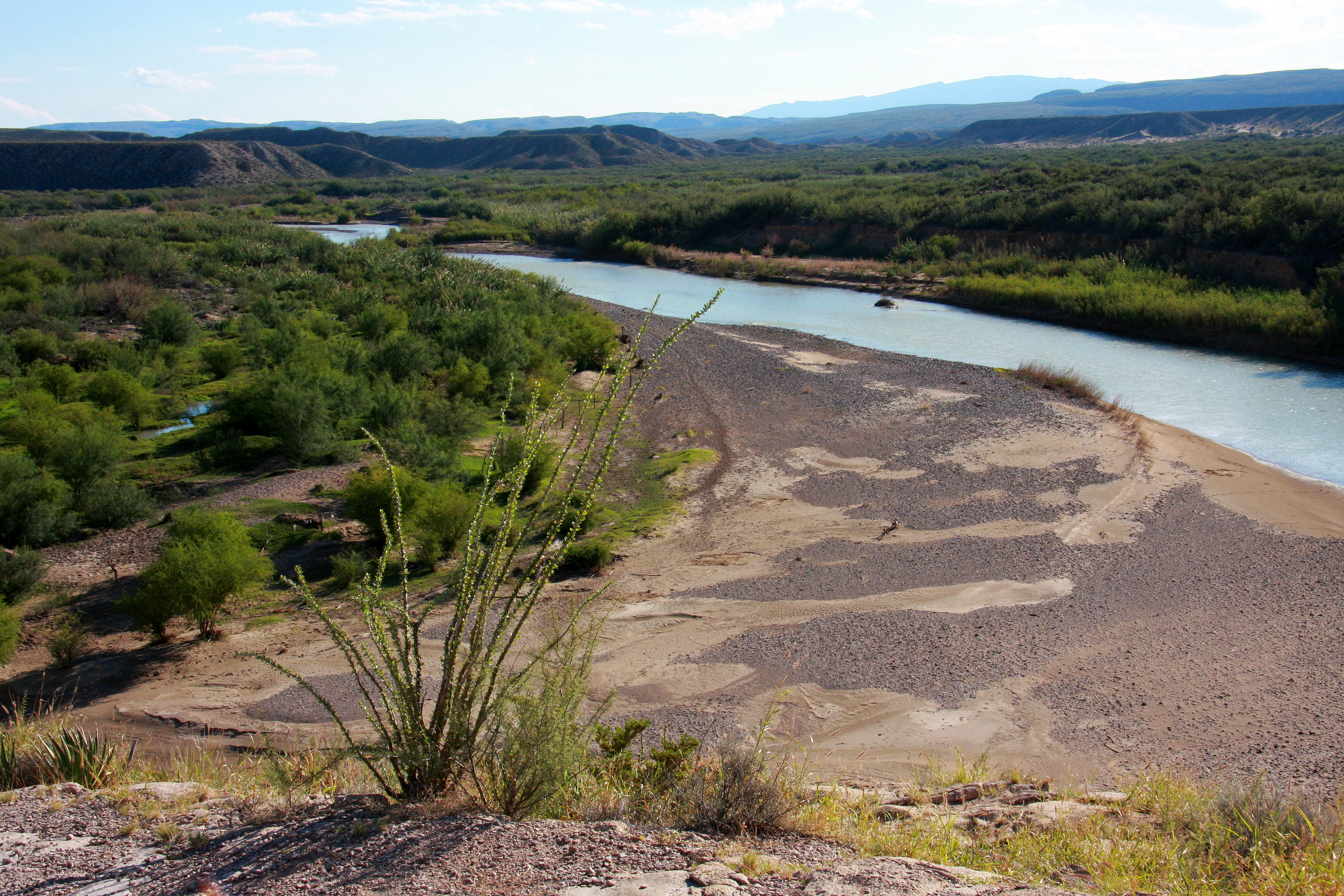
- The Rio Grande at Big Bend National Park, on the Mexico–U.S. border

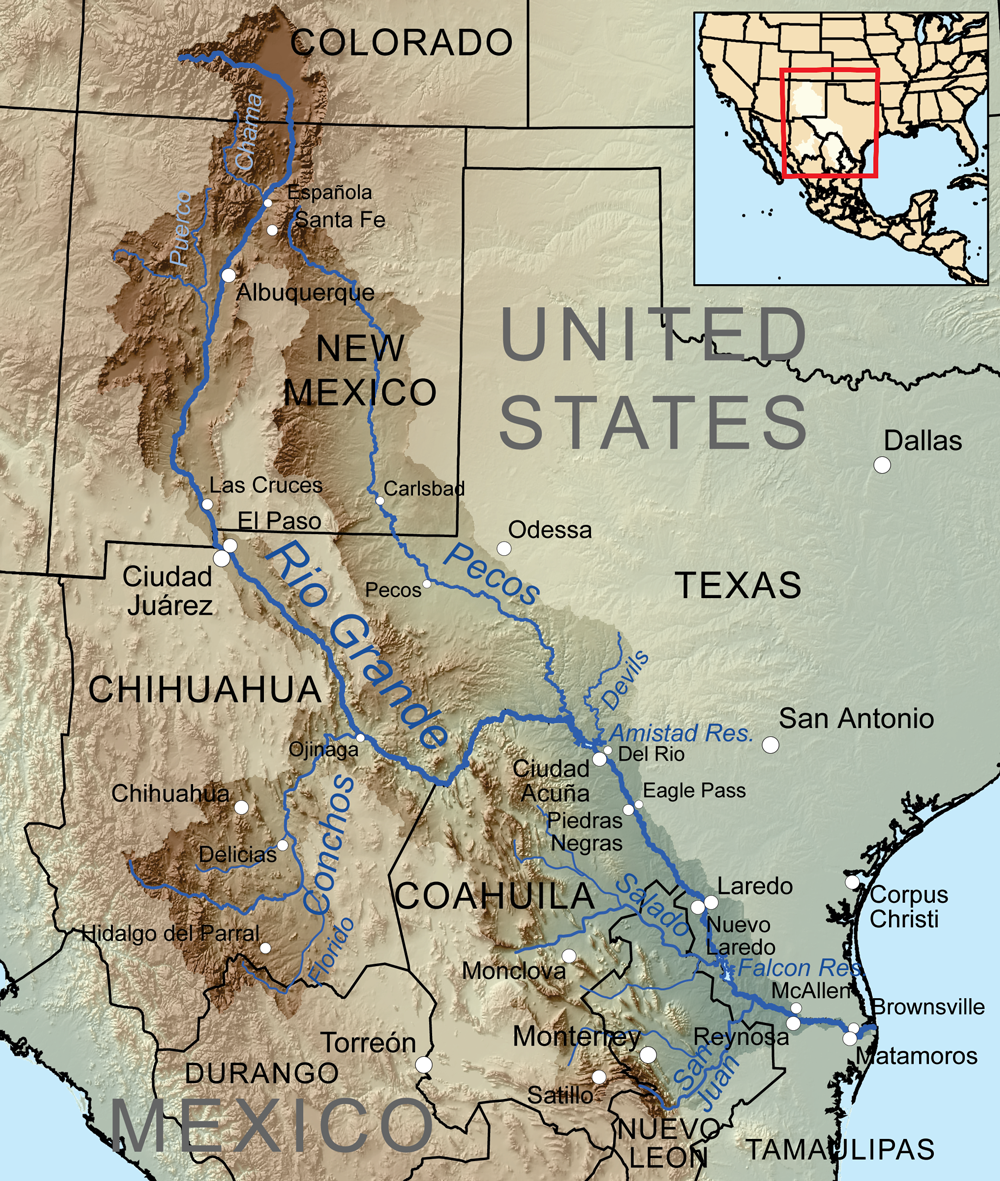
- Map of the Rio Grande drainage basin

Location
- Countries: United States, Mexico
- States: Colorado, New Mexico, Texas, Chihuahua, Coahuila, Nuevo León, Tamaulipas
- Major cities: Española, NM; Albuquerque, NM; Las Cruces, NM; El Paso, TX–Ciudad Juárez, CHH; Ojinaga, CHH; Ciudad Acuña, CHH; Piedras Negras, CHH; Laredo, TX–Nuevo Laredo, TAM; Reynosa, TAM–McAllen, TX; Brownsville, TX–Matamoros, TAM

Physical characteristics
- Source: Main stem source: Canby Mountain, Continental Divide, CO
  - location: San Juan Mountains, Rio Grande National Forest, CO
  - coordinates: 37°47′51″N 107°32′35″W
  - elevation: 12,000 ft (3,700 m)
- 2nd source: Most distant source: Pole creek, Tundra Top peak 13450, Continental Divide, CO
  - location: San Juan Mountains, Rio Grande National Forest, CO
  - coordinates: 37°51′6″N 107°25′28″W
  - elevation: 12,760 ft (3,890 m)
- Mouth: Gulf of Mexico
  - location: near Starbase, TX
  - coordinates: 25°57′22″N 97°8′43″W
  - elevation: 0 ft (0 m)
- Length: 1,896 mi (3,051 km)
- Basin size: 182,200 sq mi (472,000 km^{2})
- Discharge
  - location: Eagle Pass, TX – Piedras Negras, COA
  - average: 2,403 cu ft/s (68.0 m^{3}/s)
  - minimum: 24 cu ft/s (0.68 m^{3}/s)
  - maximum: 964,000 cu ft/s (27,300 m^{3}/s)

Basin features
- Tributaries
  - left: Red River, Rio Hondo, Rio Pueblo de Taos, Embudo Creek, Santa Fe River, Galisteo Creek, Alamito Creek, Terlingua Creek, Pecos River, Devils River
  - right: Conejos River, Rio Chama, Jemez River, Rio Puerco, Rio Conchos, Rio Salado, Rio Alamo, San Juan River

National Wild and Scenic River
- Type: Wild 150.1 miles (241.6 km); Scenic 108.5 miles (174.6 km); Recreational 0.8 miles (1.3 km)
- Designated: October 2, 1968

The Rio Grande (/ˌriːoʊ ˈɡrænd/ or /ˌriːoʊ ˈɡrɑːndeɪ/), in the United States, or the Río Bravo (del Norte), in Mexico (Spanish pronunciation: [ˈri.o ˈβɾaβo ðel ˈnoɾte]), also known as Tó Ba'áadi in Navajo, is one of the principal rivers (along with the Colorado River) in the Southwestern United States and in northern Mexico. The length of the Rio Grande is 1,896 miles (3,051 km), making it the fourth longest river in the United States and in North America by main stem. It originates in south-central Colorado, in the United States, and flows to the Gulf of Mexico. The Rio Grande drainage basin (watershed) has an area of 182,200 square miles (472,000 km^{2}); however, the endorheic basins that are adjacent to and within the greater drainage basin of the Rio Grande increase the total drainage-basin area to 336,000 square miles (870,000 km^{2}).

The Rio Grande with its fertile valley, along with its tributaries, is a vital water source for seven U.S. and Mexican states, and flows primarily through arid and semi-arid lands. After traversing the length of New Mexico, the Rio Grande becomes the Mexico–United States border, between the U.S. state of Texas and the northern Mexican states of Chihuahua and Coahuila, Nuevo León and Tamaulipas; a short segment of the Rio Grande is a partial state-boundary between the U.S. states of New Mexico and Texas. Since the mid–twentieth century, only 20 percent of the Rio Grande's water reaches the Gulf of Mexico, because of the voluminous consumption of water required to irrigate farmland (e.g. the Mesilla and Lower Rio Grande Valleys) and to continually hydrate cities (e.g. Albuquerque); such water usages are additional to the reservoirs of water retained with diversion dams. 260 miles (418 km) of the river in New Mexico and Texas are designated as the Rio Grande Wild and Scenic River.

== Geography ==
The Rio Grande rises in the western part of Rio Grande National Forest, in the U.S. state of Colorado, and is formed by the joining of several streams at the base of Canby Mountain, in the San Juan Mountains, due east of the Continental Divide of the Americas. From the Continental Divide, the Rio Grande flows through the San Luis Valley, then south into New Mexico, and passes through the Rio Grande Gorge, near Taos, then toward Española, afterwards collecting additional waters from the Colorado River basin via the San Juan–Chama Diversion Project and from the Rio Chama. The Rio Grande then continues southwards, irrigating the farmlands in the Middle Rio Grande Valley through the desert cities of Albuquerque and Las Cruces in New Mexico, to El Paso, Texas, and Ciudad Juárez, Chihuahua, in Mexico. In the Albuquerque metropolitan area, the Rio Grande flows by historic Pueblo villages, such as Sandia Pueblo and Isleta Pueblo. South of El Paso, the Rio Grande is the national border between the U.S. and Mexico.

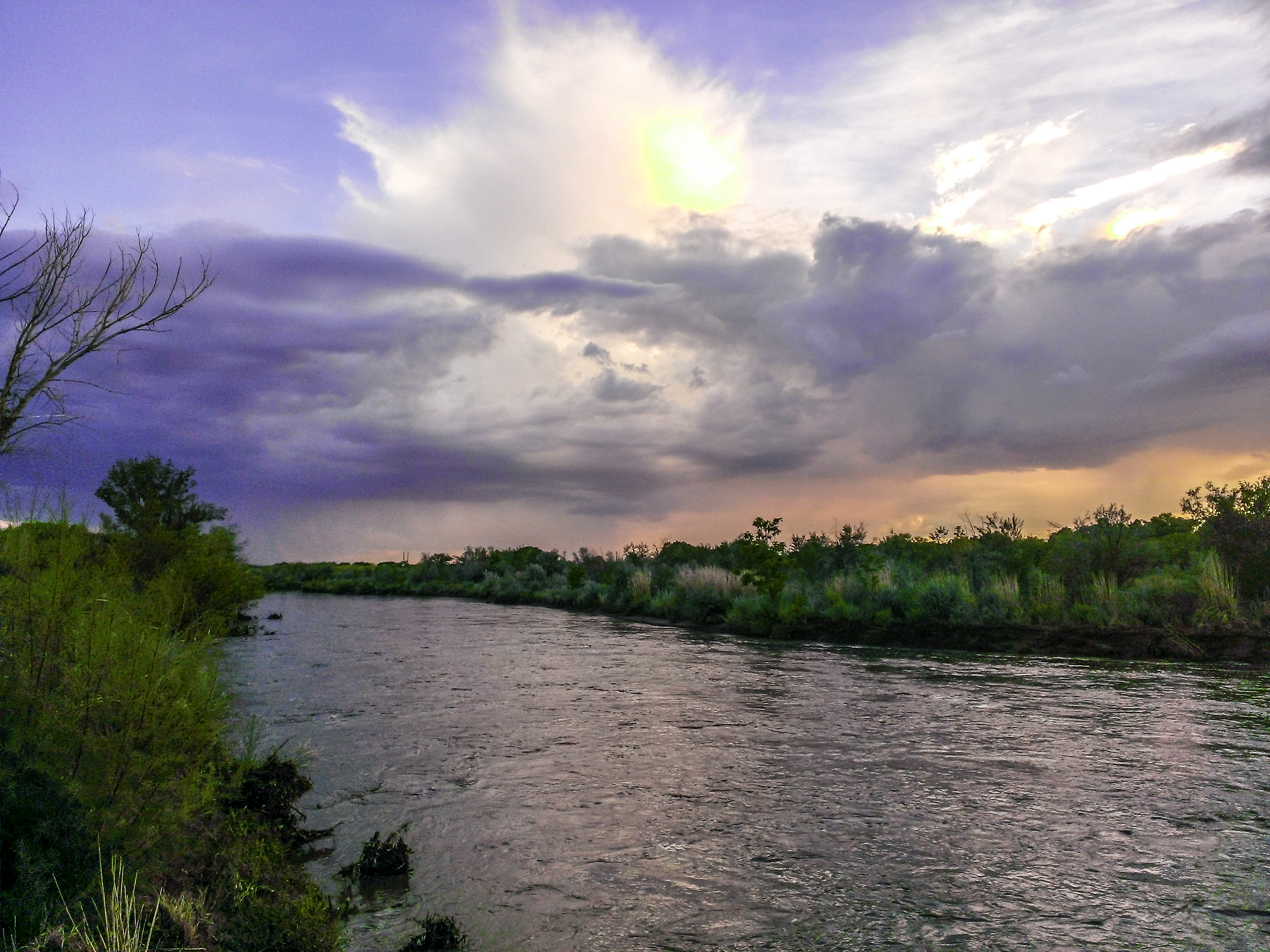
A riverine islet in the Rio Grande, seen from North Valley, New Mexico

The segment of the river that forms the international border ranges from 889 to 1,248 miles (1,431 to 2,008 km), depending on how the river is measured. The Rio Conchos is a major tributary of the Rio Grande, with its confluence 310 km. (193 straight air miles) southeast of El Paso near Ojinaga, in Chihuahua, Mexico. Downstream, other tributaries include the Pecos River and Devils River, both entering the Rio Grande from the north in the vicinity of Amistad Reservoir in Texas, and the Rio Salado and Rio San Juan both entering from the south with confluences in Tamaulipas, Mexico.

The Rio Grande rises in high mountains and flows for much of its length at high elevation; the valley floor at Albuquerque is 5,312 feet (1,619 m), and El Paso 3,762 feet (1,147 m) above sea level. In New Mexico, the river flows through the Rio Grande rift from one sediment-filled basin to another, cutting canyons between the basins and supporting a fragile bosque ecosystem on its flood plain. From Albuquerque southward, the river flows through desert. Although irrigated agriculture exists throughout most of its stretch, it is particularly extensive in the subtropical Lower Rio Grande Valley. The river ends in a small, sandy delta at the Gulf of Mexico. During portions of 2001 and 2002, the mouth of the Rio Grande was blocked by a sandbar. In the fall of 2003, the sandbar was cleared by high river flows around 7,063 cubic feet per second (200 m^{3}/s).

The Rio Grande flows through a valley with diverse animal and plant populations. Conservation of the river and the valley is a recurring theme for people who live in the region.

== Navigation ==
Although the river's greatest depth is 60 feet (18 m), the Rio Grande generally cannot be navigated by passenger riverboats or by cargo barges. Navigation is only possible near the mouth of the river, in rare circumstances up to Laredo, Texas.

Navigation was active during much of the 19th century, with over 200 different steamboats operating between the river's mouth close to Brownsville and Rio Grande City, Texas. Many steamboats from the Ohio and Mississippi Rivers were requisitioned by the U.S. government and moved to the Rio Grande during the Mexican–American War in 1846. They provided transport for the U.S. Army, under General Zachary Taylor, to invade Monterrey, Nuevo León, via Camargo Municipality, Tamaulipas. Army engineers recommended that with small improvements, the river could easily be made navigable as far north as El Paso. Those recommendations were never acted upon.

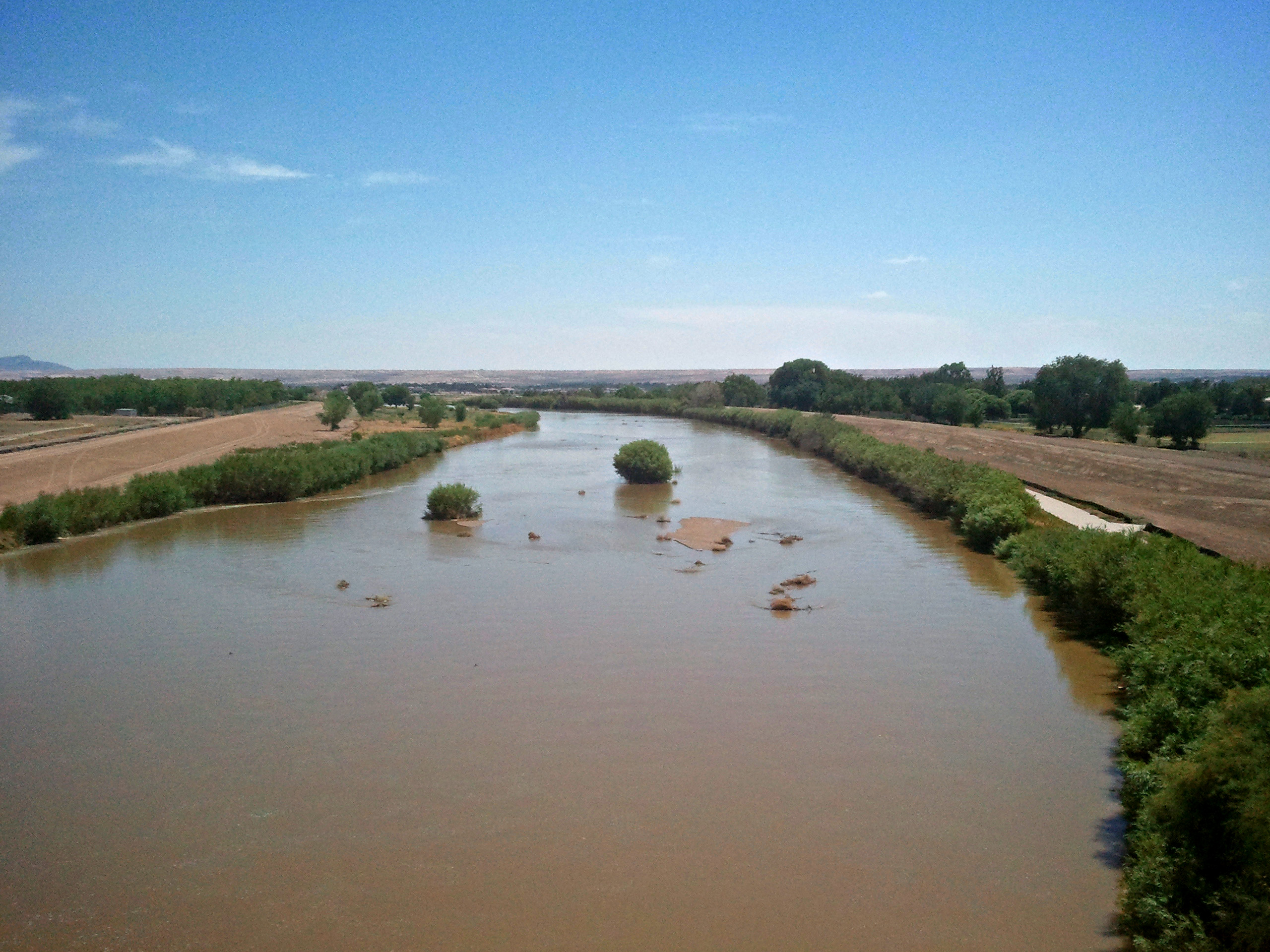
Rio Grande in west El Paso near the New Mexico state line

The Brownsville & Matamoros International Bridge, a large swing bridge, dates back to 1910 and is still in use today by automobiles connecting Brownsville with Matamoros, Tamaulipas. The swing mechanism has not been used since the early 1900s, though, when the last of the big steamboats disappeared. At one point, the bridge also had rail traffic. Railroad trains no longer use this bridge. A new rail bridge (West Rail International Crossing) connecting the U.S. and Mexico was built about 15 miles west of the Brownsville & Matamoros International Bridge. It was inaugurated in August 2015. It moved all rail operations out of downtown Brownsville and Matamoros. The West Rail International Crossing is the first new international rail crossing between the U.S. and Mexico in over a century. The Brownsville & Matamoros International Bridge is now operated by the Brownsville and Matamoros Bridge Company, a joint venture between the Mexican government and the Union Pacific Railroad.

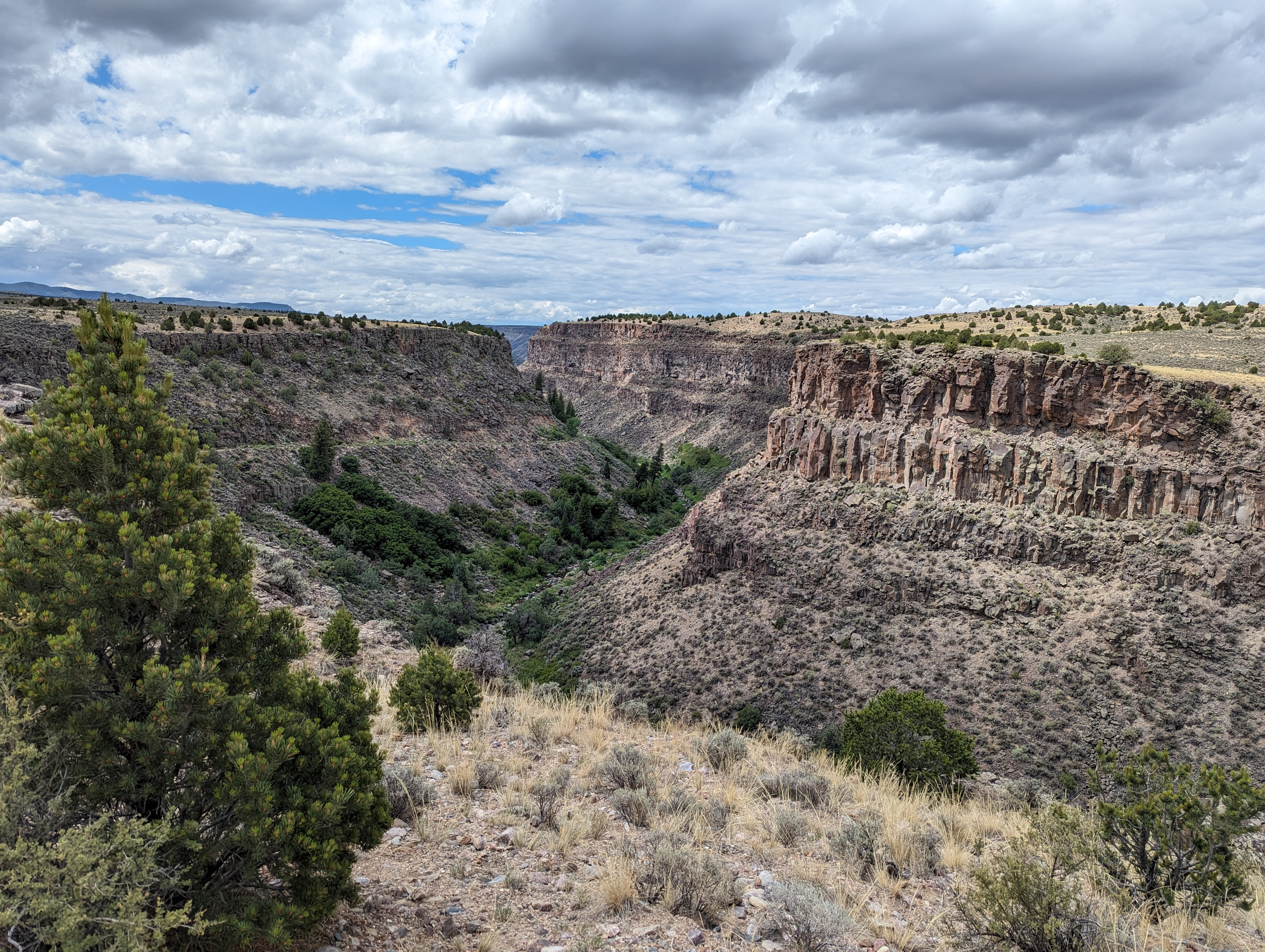
Rio Grande Gorge in Central New Mexico

At the mouth of the Rio Grande, on the Mexican side, was the large commercial port of Bagdad, Tamaulipas. During the American Civil War, this was the only legitimate port of the Confederacy. European warships anchored offshore to maintain the port's neutrality, and managed to do so successfully throughout that conflict, despite occasional stare-downs with blockading ships from the US Navy. It was a shallow-draft river port, with several smaller vessels that hauled cargo to and from the deeper-draft cargo ships anchored off shore. These deeper-draft ships could not cross the shallow sandbar at the mouth of the river. The port's commerce was European military supplies, in exchange for bales of cotton.

== History ==
=== Ancestral Rio Grande ===
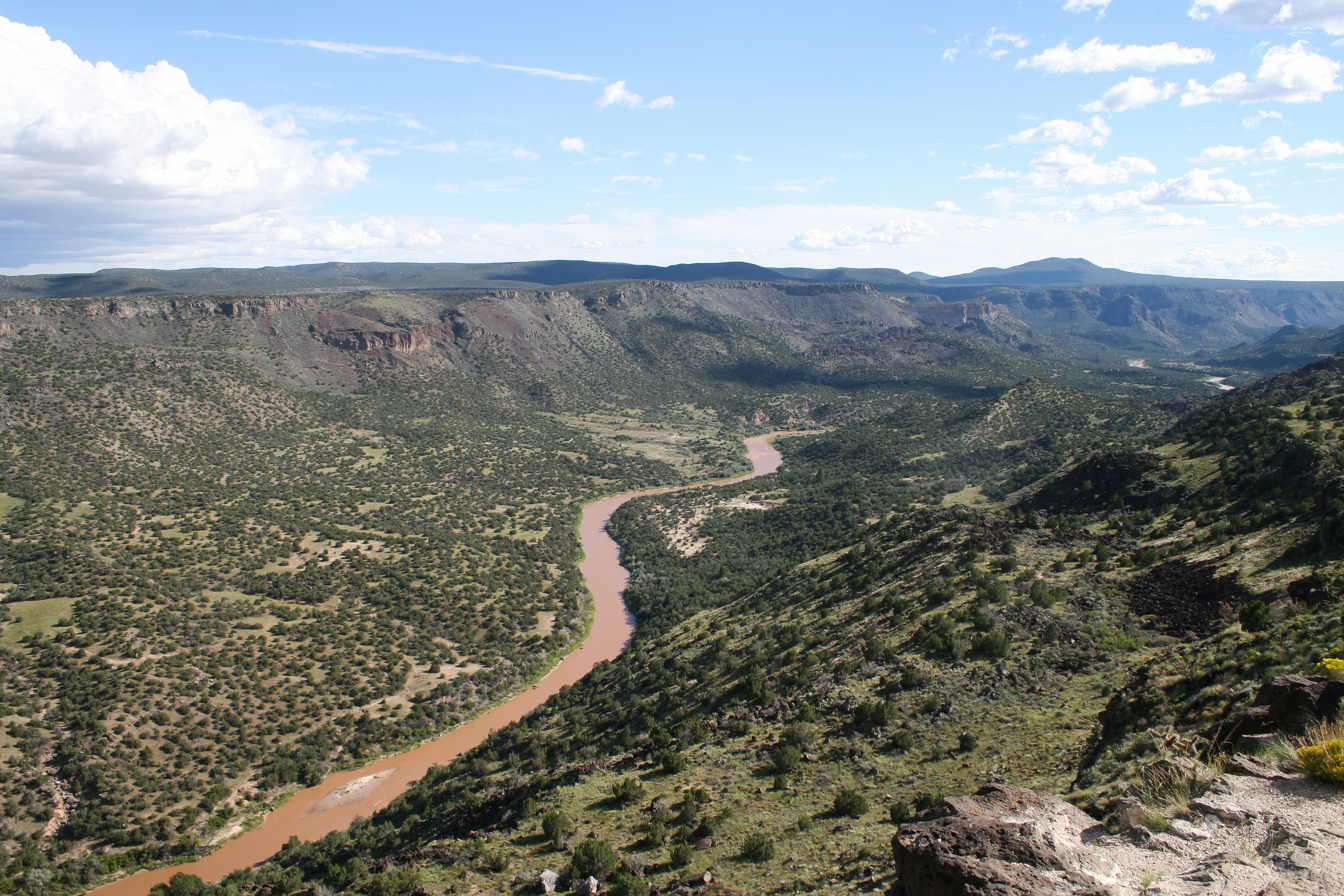
View of the Rio Grande from Overlook Park, White Rock, New Mexico

The sedimentary basins forming the modern Rio Grande Valley were not integrated into a single river system draining into the Gulf of Mexico until relatively recent geologic time. Instead, the basins formed by the opening of the Rio Grande rift were initially bolsons, with no external drainage and a central playa. An axial river existed in the Espanola Basin as early as 13 million years ago, reaching the Santo Domingo Basin by 6.9 million years ago. However, at this time, the river drained into a playa in the southern Albuquerque Basin where it deposited the Popotosa Formation. The upper reach of this river corresponded to the modern Rio Chama, but by 5 million years ago, an ancestral Rio Grande draining the eastern San Juan Mountains had joined the ancestral Rio Chama.

The ancestral Rio Grande progressively integrated basins to the south, reaching the Mesilla Basin by 4.5 million years and the Palomas basin by 3.1 million years ago, forming Lake Palomas. River capture by a tributary of the Pecos River then occurred, with the Rio Grande flowing to Texas by 2.06 million years, and finally joining the Pecos River 800,000 years ago, which drained into the Gulf of Mexico. Volcanism in the Taos Plateau reduced drainage from the San Luis Basin until a spillover event 440,000 years ago that drained Lake Alamosa, forming the Rio Grande Gorge, and fully reintegrated the San Luis Basin into the Rio Grande watershed.

=== Prior to European contact ===
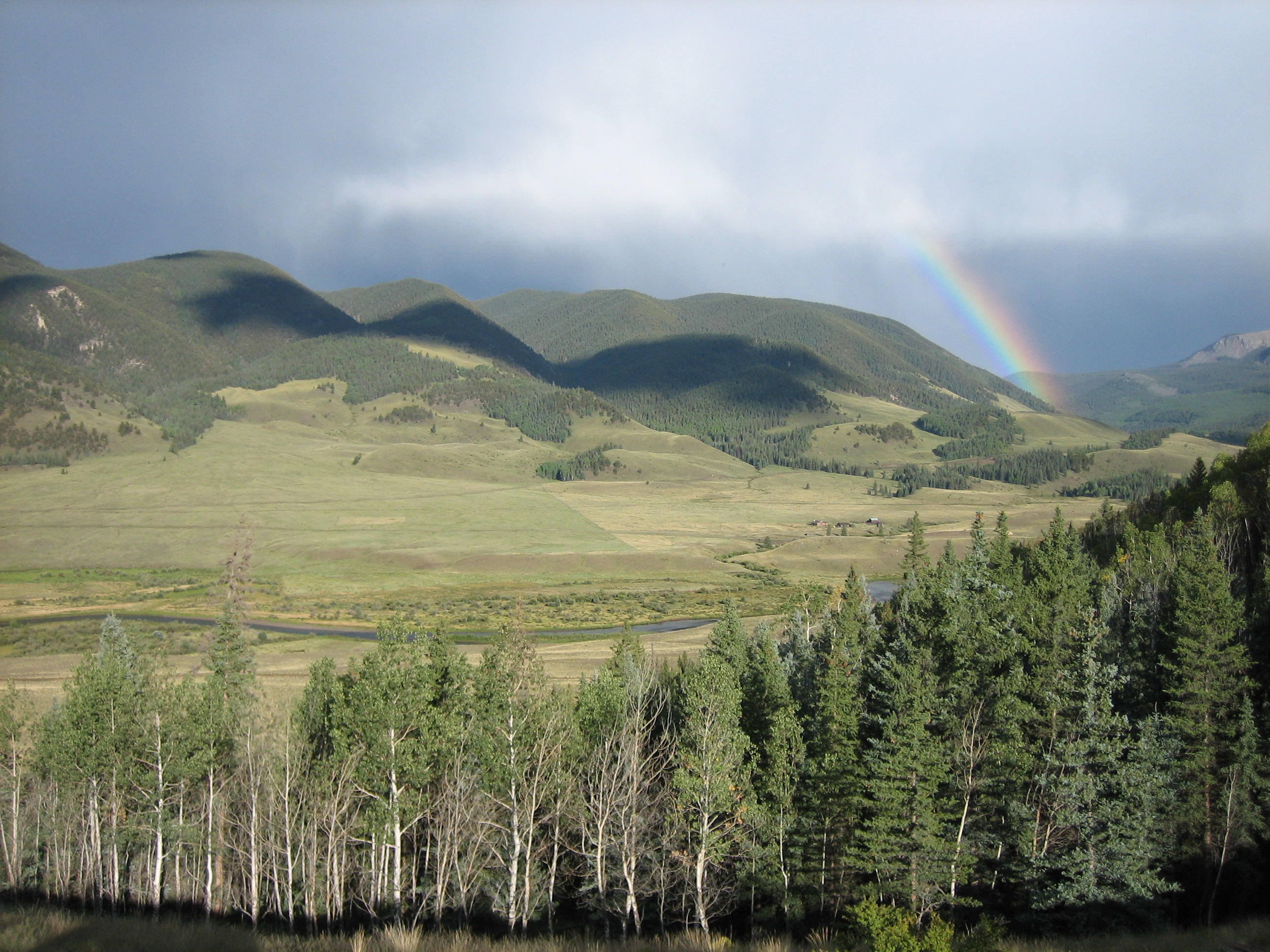
The Upper Rio Grande near Creede, Colorado

Archeological sites from the earliest human presence in the Rio Grande Valley are scarce, due to traditional Indigenous nomadic culture, Pleistocene and Holocene river incision or burial under the Holocene floodplain. However, some early sites are preserved on West Mesa on the west side of the Rio Grande near Albuquerque. These include Folsom sites, possibly dating from around 10,800 to 9,700 BCE, that were probably short-term sites such as buffalo kill sites. Preservation is better in flanking basins of the Rio Grande Valley, where numerous Folsom sites and a much smaller number of earlier Clovis sites have been identified. Later Paleo-Indian groups included the Belen and Cody cultures, who appear to have taken advantage of the Rio Grande Valley for seasonal migrations and may have settled more permanently in the valley.

The Paleo-Indian cultures gave way to the Archaic Oshara tradition beginning around 5450 BCE. The Oshara began cultivation of maize between 1750 and 750 BCE, and their settlements became larger and more permanent.

Drought induced the collapse of the Ancestral Puebloan culture, at Chaco Canyon and elsewhere across the Four Corners region, at around 1130 CE. This led to a mass migration of the Ancestral Puebloans to the Rio Grande and other more fertile valleys of the Southwest, competing with other indigenous communities such as the Apache with territory in the Rio Grande Valley. This led to decades of conflict (the Coalition Period), the eventual merging of cultures, and the establishment of most of the Tanoan and Keresan pueblos of the Rio Grande Valley. This was followed by the Classic Period, from about 1325 CE to 1600 CE and the arrival of the Spanish. The upper Rio Grande Valley was characterized by occasional periods of extreme drought, and the human inhabitants make extensive use of gridded gardens and check dams to stretch the uncertain water supply.

=== Spanish exploration ===
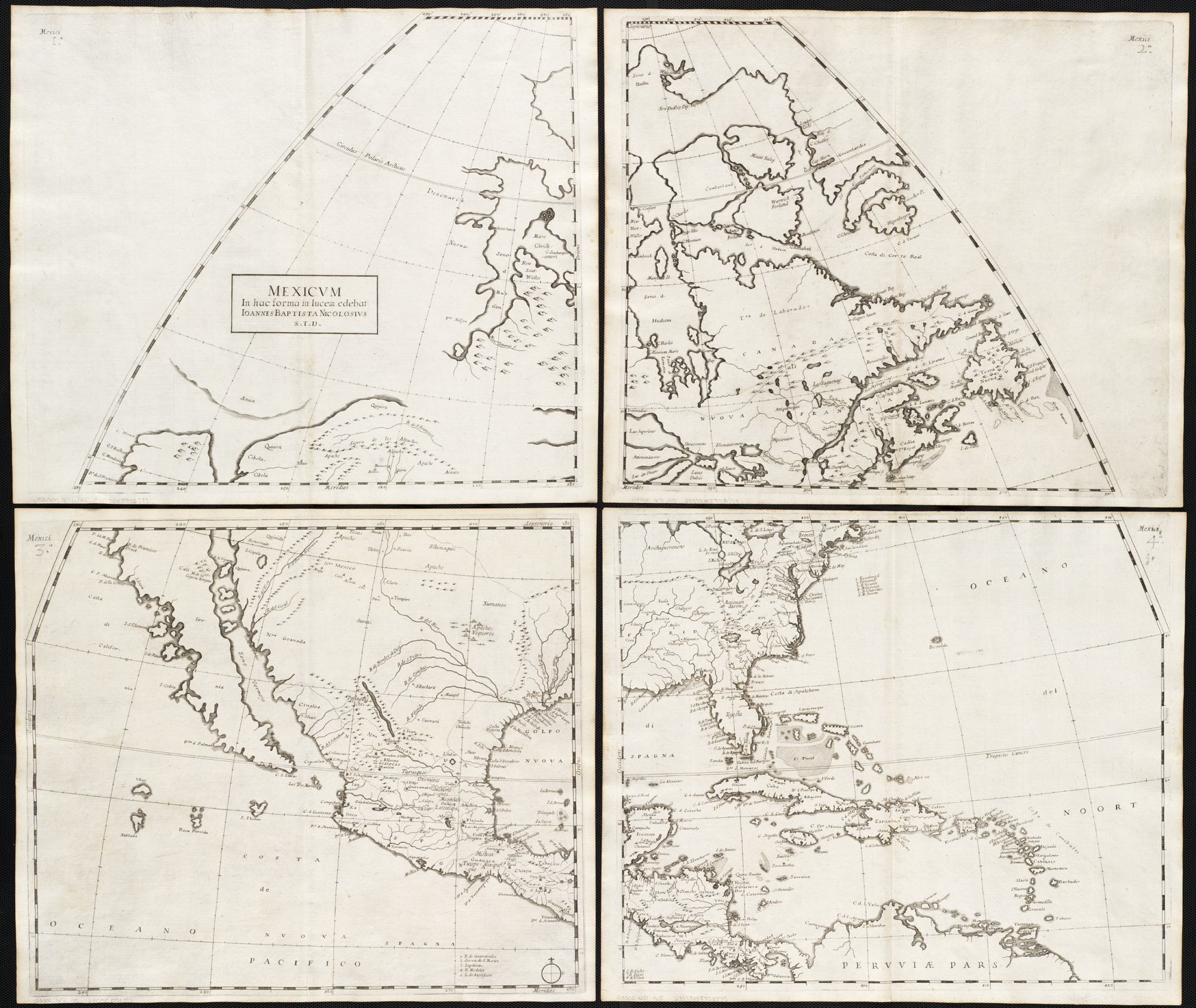
Rare first state of Giovan Battista Nicolosi's four-sheet map of North America, the first printed map to accurately depict the course of the Rio Grande (named Rio Escondido) flowing into the Gulf of Mexico

In 1519, a Spanish naval expedition along the northeastern coast of Mexico charted the mouths of several rivers including the Rio Grande. In 1536, the Rio Grande appeared for the first time on a map of New Spain produced by a royal Spanish cartographer. In the autumn of 1540, a military expedition of the Viceroyalty of New Spain led by Francisco Vásquez de Coronado, Governor of Nueva Galicia, reached the Tiwa pueblos along the Rio Grande in the future New Mexico. On July 12, 1598, Don Juan de Oñate y Salazar established the New Spain colony of Santa Fe de Nuevo Méjico at the new village of San Juan de los Caballeros adjacent to the Ohkay Owingeh Pueblo at the confluence of the Rio Grande and the Río Chama.

=== Since 1830 ===
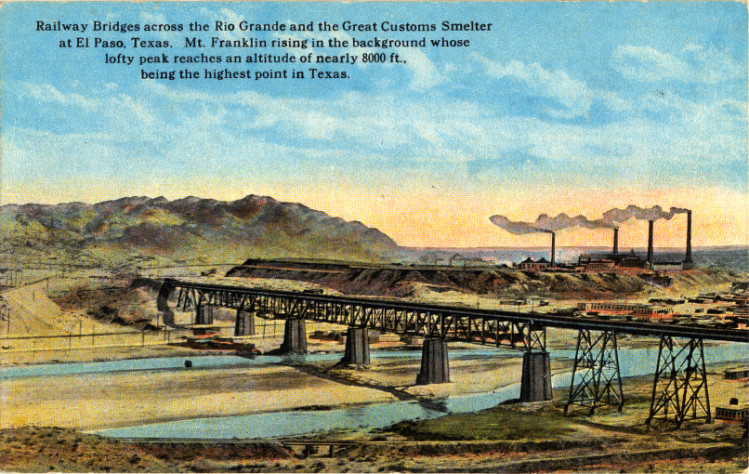
Railway Bridges and the Great Customs Smelter (postcard, circa 1916)

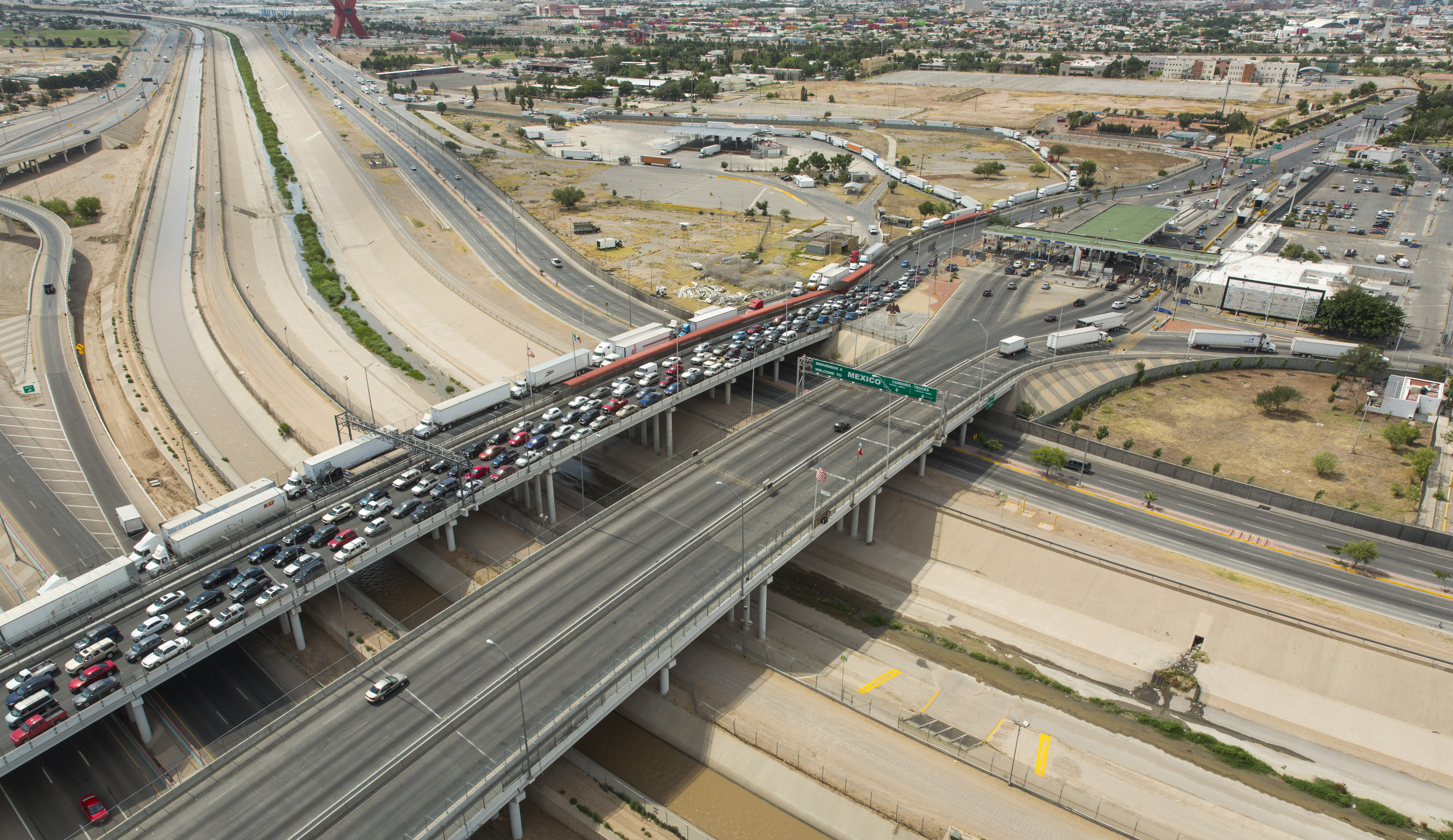
Bridge of the Americas from El Paso, US to Ciudad Juárez, Mexico (2016)

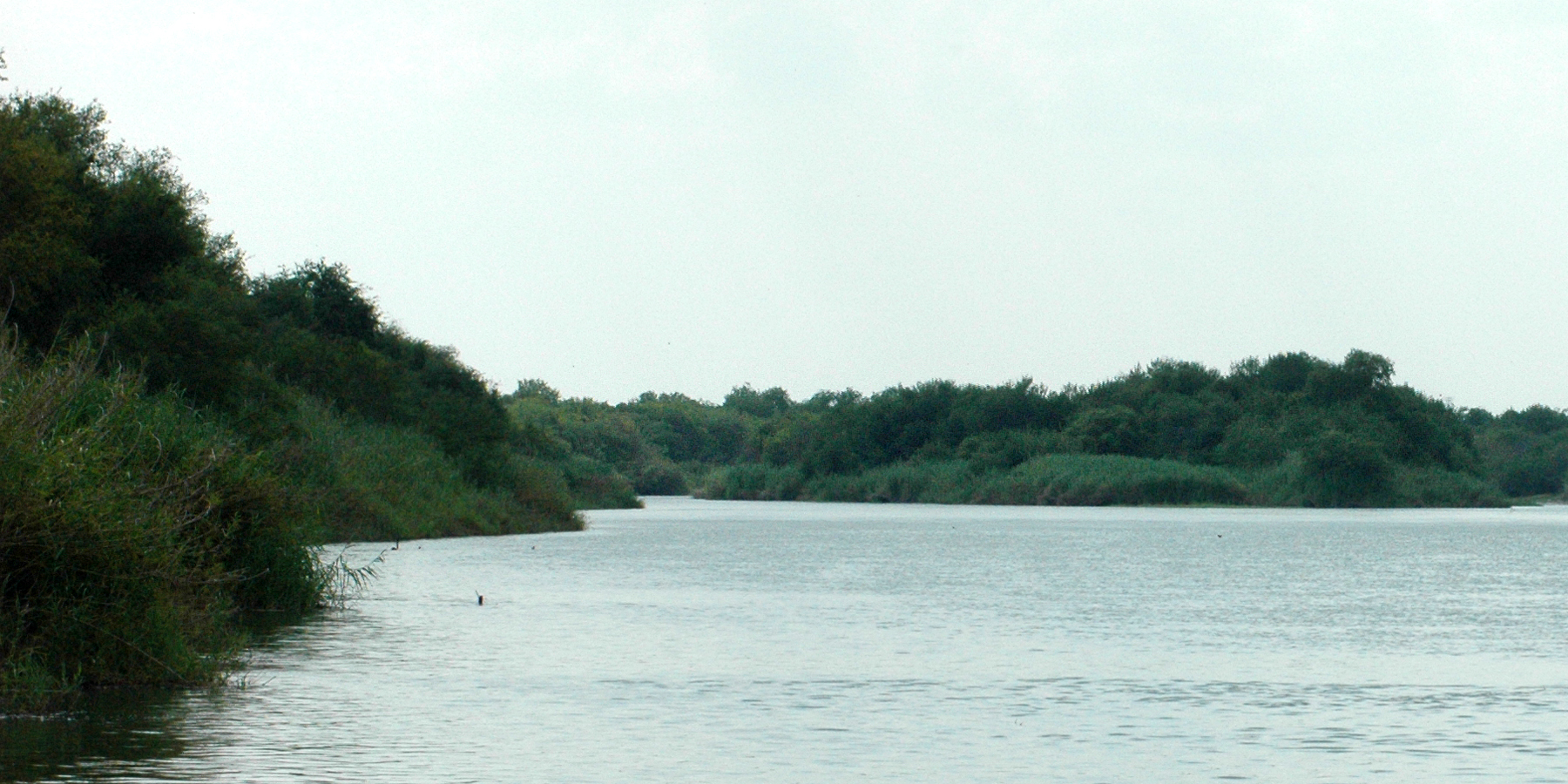
Rio Grande southeast of Falcon Reservoir, Municipality of Mier, Tamaulipas, Mexico (2007)

During the late 1830s and early 1840s, the river marked the disputed border between Mexico and the nascent Republic of Texas; Mexico marked the border at the Nueces River. The disagreement provided part of the rationale for the Mexican–American War in 1846, after Texas had been admitted as a new state. Since 1848, the Rio Grande has marked the boundary between Mexico and the United States from the twin cities of El Paso, Texas, and Ciudad Juárez, Chihuahua, to the Gulf of Mexico. As such, crossing the river was the escape route used by some Texan slaves to seek freedom. Mexico had liberal colonization policies and had abolished slavery in 1828. In 1899, after a gradual change to the river position, a channel was dug for flood control which moved the river, creating what was called Cordova Island, which became the center of the Chamizal dispute. Resolving the dispute took many years and resulted in a 1909 combined assassination attempt on the American and Mexican presidents.

=== Rio Grande Water Rights (1900–present) ===
Following the approval of the Rio Grande Project by federal lawmakers in 1905, the waters of the Rio Grande were to be divided between the states of New Mexico and Texas based on their respective amount of irrigable land. The project also accorded 60,000 acre-feet (74 million cubic meters) of water annually to Mexico in response to the country's demands. This was meant to put an end to the many years of disagreement concerning rights to the river's flow and the construction of a dam and reservoir at various location on the river between the agricultural interests of the Mesilla Valley and those of El Paso and Juárez. In the agreement provisions were made to construct Elephant Butte dam on public lands. This act was the first occurrence of congressionally directed allocation of an interstate river (although New Mexico would not achieve statehood till 1912).

Following the admittance of New Mexico into the union, the increased settlement of the Rio Grande farther north in Colorado and near Albuquerque, the 1938 Rio Grande Compact developed primarily because of the necessary repeal of the Rio Grande embargo among other issues. Though both Colorado and New Mexico were initially eager to begin negotiations, they broke down over whether Texas should be allowed to join negotiations in 1928, though it had representatives present. In an effort to avoid litigation of the matter in the Supreme Court a provisional agreement was signed in 1929 which stated that negotiations would resume once a reservoir was built on the New Mexico-Colorado state line. The construction of this was delayed by the Market Crash of 1929. With negotiations remaining stagnant, Texas sued New Mexico over the issue in 1935, prompting the intervention of the president who set up the Rio Grande Joint Investigation the findings of which helped lead to the final agreement. The 1938 Rio Grande Compact provided for the creation of a compact commission, the creation of gaging stations along the river to ensure flow amounts by Colorado to New Mexico at the state line and by New Mexico to Elephant Butte Reservoir, the water once there would fall under the regulation of the Rio Grande Project which would guarantee provision to Texas and Mexico. A system of debits and credits was created to account for variations in the water provided. The compact remains in effect today, though it has been amended twice.

In 1944, the US and Mexico signed a treaty regarding the river. Due to drought conditions which have prevailed throughout much of the 21st century, calls for a reexamination of this treaty have been made by locals in New Mexico, Mexico, and Texas. Texas, being the state with the least amount of control over the waterway, has routinely seen an under-provision of water since 1992. In 1997, the US designated the Rio Grande as one of the American Heritage Rivers. Two portions of the Rio Grande are designated National Wild and Scenic Rivers System, one in northern New Mexico and the other in Texas, at Big Bend National Park.

In mid-2001, a 328-foot (100 m)-wide sandbar formed at the mouth of the river, marking the first time in recorded history that the Rio Grande failed to empty into the Gulf of Mexico. The sandbar was dredged, but reformed almost immediately. Spring rains the following year flushed the reformed sandbar out to sea, but it returned in mid-2002. By late 2003, the river once again reached the Gulf.

=== Uncertain future ===
For much of the time since water rights were introduced in the 1890s, the Rio Grande flowed through Las Cruces from February to October each year, but this is subject to climate change. In 2020, the river flowed only from March to September. As of January 2021, the Elephant Butte Irrigation District (Ebid) expected that water shortages would mean the river only flows through Las Cruces from June through July. The water shortages are affecting the local ecosystem and endangering species including cottonwood trees and the southwestern willow flycatcher.

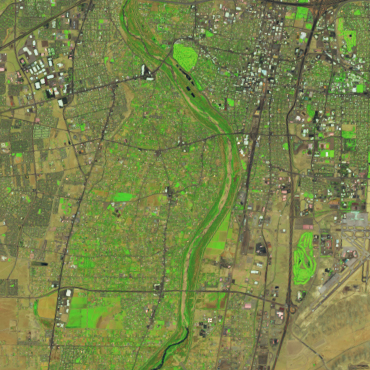
A five-mile stretch of the river ran dry in Albuquerque in 2022.

The water of the Rio Grande is over-appropriated: that is, more users for the water exist than water in the river. Because of both drought and overuse, the section from Las Cruces downstream through Ojinaga frequently runs dry and was recently tagged "The Forgotten River" by those wishing to bring attention to the river's deteriorated condition.

In 2022, due to increasing drought and water use, the water debt owed to Texas increased from 31,000 acre-feet to over 130,000 acre-feet since 2021, despite "very significant efforts that were done on the river this year to keep water flowing downstream." In response, New Mexico increased its program offering to subsidize farmers who fallow their fields rather than planting crops, which uses additional water; the city of Albuquerque shut off its domestic supply diversion and switched to full groundwater pumping in 2021.

Additionally, in 2022, work began on El Vado Dam, during which it is unavailable for storage, reducing system capacity by about 180,000 acre-feet. MRGCD has requested storage of "native water" downstream at Abiquiu Reservoir, which normally only stores waters imported into the Rio Grande watershed from the Colorado River watershed via the San Juan–Chama Project.

Elephant Butte Reservoir, the main storage reservoir on the Rio Grande, was reported at 13.1% of capacity as of May 1, 2022, further decreasing to only 5.9% full by November 2021. Nearly a year later, in October 2022, the reservoir had made only insignificant rebounds, resting at 6.4% of capacity.

In late July 2022, due to extreme drought, the Rio Grande ran dry for about 50 miles in the middle Rio Grande Valley, including five miles in Albuquerque, the first time it had done so in over 40 years. The following winter, the basin experienced above-average snowfall, leading to very high flows in the river in spring of 2023 and flooding of some of its tributaries, including the Jemez and Pecos Rivers. By that summer, after the spring runoff had concluded and due to a failed New Mexico monsoon season and record high temperatures, the river went dry in Albuquerque for a second consecutive year.

== River modifications ==
The United States and Mexico share the water of the river under a series of agreements administered by the International Boundary and Water Commission (IBWC), US–Mexico. The most notable of these treaties were signed in 1906 and 1944. The IBWC traces its institutional roots to 1889, when the International Boundary Committee was established to maintain the border. The IBWC today also allocates river waters between the two nations and provides for flood control and water sanitation. Use of that water belonging to the United States is regulated by the Rio Grande Compact, an interstate pact between Colorado, New Mexico, and Texas.

The Upper Colorado River Basin Compact allots 62,780 acre-feet (77,440,000 m^{3}) of water from the upper Colorado River basin per year to municipalities in New Mexico. Albuquerque owns 48,200 acre-feet (59,500,000 m^{3}), about three-quarters of the total amount. The water is delivered to the Rio Grande via the San Juan–Chama Project. The project's construction was initiated by legislation signed by President John F. Kennedy in 1962, and was completed in 1971. This diversion project transports water under the continental divide from tributaries of the San Juan River (the Navajo, the Little Navajo, and Blanco Rivers) to Heron Reservoir, which empties into the Rio Chama before this connects to the Rio Grande. Although it held rights to San Juan-Chama water for many years, it was only as of 2008 that Albuquerque began using it as part of its municipal supply, with the completion of San Juan-Chama Drinking Water Project (SJCDWP) by the Albuquerque Bernalillo County Water Utility Authority.

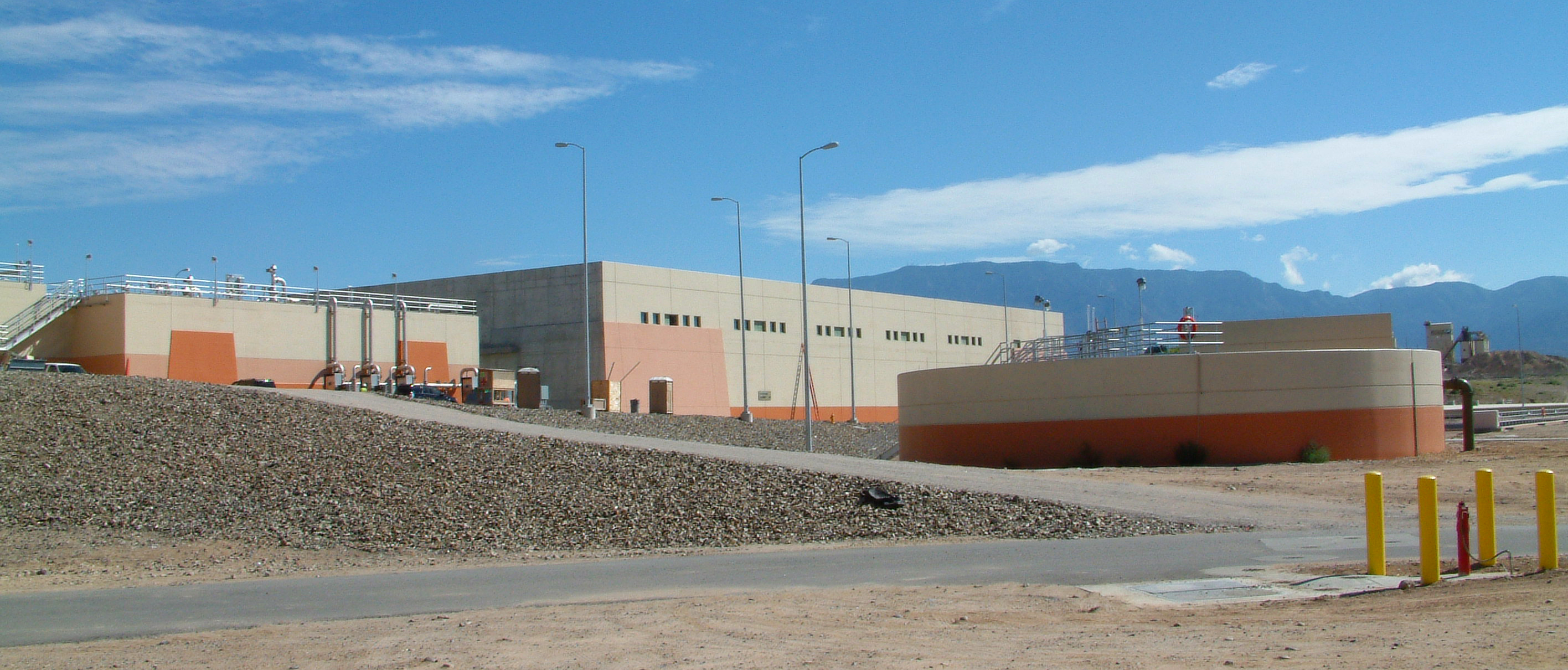
Treatment plant, San Juan-Chama Drinking Water Project, Albuquerque

The SJCDWP uses an adjustable-height diversion dam to skim imported San Juan-Chama water from the Rio Grande, then pumps this water to a treatment plant on Albuquerque's north side. From there it is added to a municipal drinking water distribution system serving Albuquerque's metro area. Diversions are restricted during periods of low river flow in order to protect the riparian ecosystem and mitigate effects on endangered species like the Rio Grande silvery minnow. Treated effluent water is recycled into the Rio Grande south of the city. Surface water from the SJCDWP comprises a significant percentage of Albuquerque's drinking water supply, with groundwater constituting the remainder; annual percentages vary according to runoff and climate conditions. Acquisition of native pre-1907 water rights is not part of the Water Authority's long-term resource management plan, dubbed WATER 2120.

Dams on the Rio Grande include Rio Grande Dam, Cochiti Dam, Elephant Butte Dam, Caballo Dam, Amistad Dam, Falcon Dam, Anzalduas Dam, and Retamal Dam. In southern New Mexico and the upper portion of the Texas border segment, the river's discharge dwindles. Diversions, mainly for agricultural irrigation, have increased the natural decrease in flow such that by the time the river reaches Presidio, little or no water is left. Below Presidio, the Rio Conchos restores the flow of water. Near Presidio, the river's discharge is frequently zero. Its average discharge is 178 cubic feet per second (5 m^{3}/s), down from 945 cubic feet per second (27 m^{3}/s) at Elephant Butte Dam. Supplemented by other tributaries, the Rio Grande's discharge increases to its maximum annual average of 3,504 cubic feet per second (99 m^{3}/s) near Rio Grande City. Large diversions for irrigation below Rio Grande City reduce the river's average flow to 889 cubic feet per second (25 m^{3}/s) at Brownsville and Matamoros.

== Crossings ==
The major international border crossings along the river are at Ciudad Juárez and El Paso; Presidio and Ojinaga; Laredo and Nuevo Laredo; McAllen and Reynosa; and Brownsville and Matamoros. Other notable border towns are the Texas/Coahuila pairings of Del Rio–Ciudad Acuña and Eagle Pass–Piedras Negras.

== Names and pronunciation ==
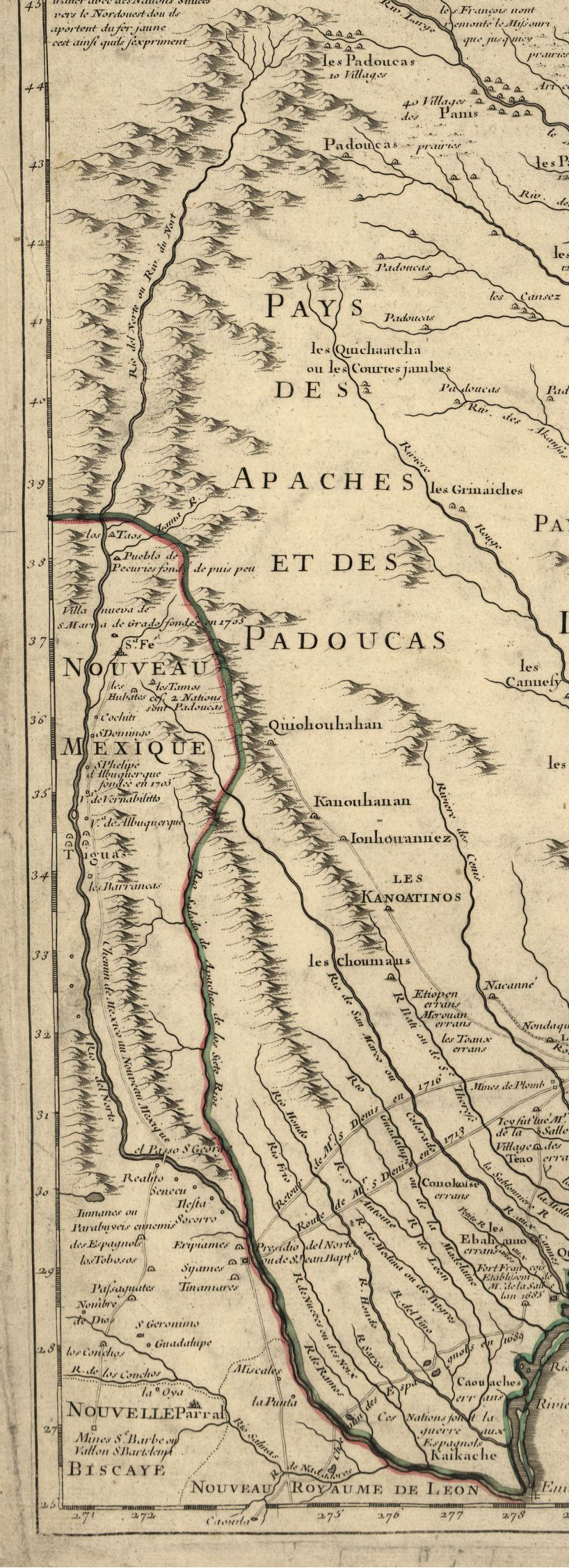
The Rio Grande (Rio del Norte) as mapped in 1718 by Guillaume de L'Isle

Río Grande is Spanish for "Big River" and Río Grande del Norte means "Big River of the North". In English, Rio Grande is pronounced either /ˈriːoʊ ˈɡrænd/ or /ˈriːoʊ ˈɡrɑːndeɪ/.

In Mexico, it is known as Río Bravo or Río Bravo del Norte, bravo meaning (among other things) "furious", "agitated" or "wild".

Historically, the Pueblo and Navajo peoples also have had names for the Rio Grande/Rio Bravo:

- Keresan: mets'ichi chena, "Big River"
- Tewa: Pʼoesóˀon, "Big Water"; or Pʼoesógeh, "Place of the Big Water"
- Tiwa: paslápaane, "Big River"
- Towa: hañapakwa, "Great Waters"

The four Pueblo names likely antedated the Spanish entrada by several centuries.

- Tó Baʼáadi, Navajo, "Female River" (the direction south is female in Navajo cosmology)

Rio del Norte was most commonly used for the upper Rio Grande (roughly, within the present-day borders of New Mexico) from Spanish colonial times to the end of the Mexican period in the mid-19th century. This use was first documented by the Spanish in 1582. Early American settlers in South Texas began to use the modern 'English' name Rio Grande. By the late 19th century, in the United States, the name Rio Grande had become standard in being applied to the entire river, from Colorado to the sea.

By 1602, Río Bravo had become the standard Spanish name for the lower river, below its confluence with the Rio Conchos.

== Tributaries ==
The largest tributary of the Rio Grande by discharge is the Rio Conchos, which contributes almost twice as much water as any other. In terms of drainage basin size, the Pecos River is the largest.

Tributary	Average discharge		Drainage basin	
	cu ft/s	m^{3}/s	sq mi	km^{2}
San Juan River	368	10	12,950	33,500
Rio Alamo	130	3.68	1,675	4,340
Rio Salado	354	10.0	23,323	60,400
Rio San Rodrigo	130	3.68	1,050	2,720
Devils River	362	10.3	137	355
Pecos River	265	7.50	44,402	115,000
Rio Conchos	848	24.0	26,400	68,400
Rio Puerco	39.5	1.1	7,350	19,000
Jemez River	59.5	1.68	1,038	2,688
Santa Fe River	10.9	0.31	231	598.3
Rio Chama	571	16.2	3,144	8,143
Conejos River	176	4.98	887	2,297

== See also ==
- Chihuahuan Desert
- Denver & Rio Grande Railroad
- List of international border rivers
- List of longest rivers of Mexico
- List of longest rivers of the United States (by main stem)
- List of rivers of Colorado
- List of rivers of New Mexico
- List of rivers of Texas
- Rio Bravo, Texas
- Rio Grande border disputes
- Rio Grande dams and diversions
- Rio Grande Gorge
- Rio Grande Trail
- Rio Grande Wild and Scenic River
- Trans-Pecos
- West Texas
