= Cyan, Inc. v. Beaver County Employees Retirement Fund =

- Supreme Court of the United States

Argued November 28, 2017 Decided March 20, 2018
- Full case name: Cyan, Inc. v. Beaver County Employees Retirement Fund
- Docket no.: 15-1439
- Citations: 583 U.S. ___ (more) 138 S. Ct. 1061; 200 L. Ed. 2d 332

Case history
- Prior: Cert. granted, 137 S. Ct. 2325 (2017).

Holding
- The Securities Litigation Uniform Standards Act of 1998 did not strip state courts of jurisdiction to adjudicate class actions alleging only 1933 Securities Act violations; nor did it authorize removing such suits from state to federal court.

Court membership
- Chief Justice John Roberts Associate Justices Anthony Kennedy · Clarence Thomas; Ruth Bader Ginsburg · Stephen Breyer; Samuel Alito · Sonia Sotomayor; Elena Kagan · Neil Gorsuch

Cyan, Inc. v. Beaver County Employees Retirement Fund, 583 U.S. ___ (2018), was a United States Supreme Court case in which the Court held the Securities Litigation Uniform Standards Act of 1998 did not strip state courts of jurisdiction to adjudicate class actions alleging only 1933 Securities Act violations; nor did it authorize removing such suits from state to federal court.

The suit was initially filed by a group of public entities, including Beaver County against Cyan Inc alleging losses on securities attributable to shortcoming in disclosures by Cyan.

The Second Circuit (which includes New York) put 1933 Act cases in federal court, while the Ninth Circuit (which includes California) allowed '33 Act cases in state court. This circuit split was decided in favor of the Ninth Circuit's interpretation.
