= List of methods of capital punishment =

This is a list of methods of capital punishment, also known as execution.

== Current methods ==
These well-known and notable methods of capital punishment are currently legal in at least one country.

Method	Description
Hanging	One of the two most prevalent methods, in use in most countries still retaining capital punishment, usually with a calculated drop to cause neck fracture and instant loss of consciousness. Used by Afghanistan, Bahamas, Bangladesh, Botswana, Egypt, Gaza Strip, India, Iran, Iraq, Israel, Japan, Jordan, Kuwait, Liberia, Malaysia, Myanmar, Oman, Pakistan, Saint Kitts and Nevis, Singapore, South Sudan, Sudan, and Syria.: In Iran, short-drop hanging is used. This involves pulling a stool out from below the condemned. The drop is too short to cause breakage of the neck, resulting in a slower death from strangulation.
Shooting	The other most prevalent method. Can be applied: By a single shot, such as a shot to the back of a head or heart, as in Afghanistan, Belarus, Myanmar, China, Democratic Republic of the Congo, Ethiopia, Libya, Saudi Arabia, Sudan, Taiwan, Yemen, and Russia (before the moratorium).; By firing squad (as in parts of the United States, Bahrain, Cuba (last used in 2003), Nigeria, North Korea, Indonesia, Oman, Somalia, Somaliland, Tajikistan (before the 2004 moratorium), Qatar, Uganda, and the United Arab Emirates).
Lethal injection	First used in the United States in 1982, lethal injection has since been adopted by China, Guatemala, Maldives, Nigeria, Taiwan, Thailand, and Vietnam.
Electrocution	Only ever used by the United States and Philippines. Only South Carolina has it as the primary method. Now only legal in Alabama, Arkansas, Florida, Kentucky, Louisiana, Mississippi, Oklahoma, and Tennessee as a secondary method.
Nitrogen hypoxia	Only ever used by the United States, first in 2024, nitrogen hypoxia has since been adopted by Alabama, Arkansas, Louisiana, Mississippi, and Oklahoma as a secondary method.
Gas chamber	Only ever used officially by the United States and Lithuania. Extensively used by Nazi Germany as a part of the extermination camps. Now only legal in Arizona, California, Missouri, and Wyoming as a secondary method.
Decapitation	Used at various points in history in many countries. One of the most famous methods was the guillotine. Now only used in Saudi Arabia with a sword.
Stoning	The victim is battered by stones thrown by a group of people, with the injuries leading to death. It is legal in Afghanistan, Brunei, Iran, Mauritania, Northern Nigeria, Saudi Arabia, Sudan, and Yemen.

== Former methods ==
Many historically recorded methods of execution include torture, often intending to make a spectacle of pain and suffering with overtones of sadism, cruelty, intimidation, and dehumanisation, at times aimed at attempting to deter the commission of offences. Some of these methods may still be in practice by terrorist groups.

Method	Description
Animals	Crushing by elephant.; Biting by animals, as in damnatio ad bestias (i.e., the cliché, "being thrown to the lions"), as well as alligators, crocodiles, piranhas, scorpions, sharks and venomous snakes.; Tearing apart by horses (e.g., in medieval Europe and Imperial China, with four horses; or "quartering", with four horses, as in The Song of Roland), variant with tearing apart by camels was sometimes used in the Middle East.; Trampling by horses (example: Al-Musta'sim, the last Abbasid Caliph in Baghdad).; Poena cullei, used during the Roman Empire. The victim was stuffed into a sack with a number of animals and thrown into a body of water.
Asphyxia	Suffocation in ash.; Carbon monoxide poisoning by burning coal in a sealed room.; Premature burial. Used for Vestal virgins who broke their vows.; By strangulation. The result of short-drop hanging (only used in Iran in modern times).; By garrote. Used in Spain and former Spanish colonies (e.g., the Philippines).
Back-breaking	A Mongolian method of execution that avoided the spilling of blood on the ground (example: the Mongolian leader Jamukha was probably executed this way in 1206).
Blowing from a gun	Tying to the mouth of a cannon, which is then fired.
Blood eagle	Cutting the skin of the victim by the spine, breaking the ribs so they resembled blood-stained wings, and pulling the lungs out through the wounds in the victim's back. Possibly used by the Vikings (of disputed historicity).
Boiling	Carried out using a large cauldron filled with water, oil, tar, tallow, or even molten lead.
Breaking wheel	Also known as the Catherine wheel, after Catherine of Alexandria who was executed by this method.
Burning	At the stake. Infamous as a method of execution for heretics and witches. A slower method of applying single pieces of burning wood was used by Native Americans to torture their captives to death.; Molten metal. Marcus Licinius Crassus and Pavlo Pavliuk were supposedly killed this way. The execution method is associated with counterfeits (by pouring down the neck) or traitors (by pouring on the head).; Brazen bull. The victim was put inside an iron bull statue and then cooked alive after a fire was lit under it (of disputed historicity).
Crushing	By a weight, abruptly or as a slow ordeal. Giles Corey and John Darren Caymo were killed this way.
Dismemberment	Used as punishment for high treason in the Ancien régime; also used by several others countries at various points in history.
Drowning	Execution by drowning is attested very early in history, by a large variety of cultures, and as the method of execution for many different offences.
Exposure (starvation, dehydration, hypothermia, etc.)	Crucifixion. Roping or nailing to a wooden cross or similar apparatus (such as a tree) and leaving to perish. The cause of death may be asphixiation, although this is disputed. The crucifixion of Jesus is the most notable instance of this method.; Gibbeting. The victim is placed in cage hanging from a gallows-type structure in a public location and left to die to deter other existing or potential criminals.; Immurement. The confinement of the victim by walling in. Though this was also used as a form of imprisonment for life, in which case, the victim was usually fed and watered.; Marooning. Leaving the victim on a very remote island without resources for survival, a common pirate punishment during the Age of Sail.
Falling	The victim is thrown off a height or into a hollow (example: the Barathron in Athens, into which the Athenian generals condemned for their part in the battle of Arginusae were cast). In Argentina during the Dirty War, those secretly abducted were later drugged and thrown from an airplane into the ocean.
Flaying	The removal of the entire skin.
Hanging, drawing, and quartering	English torturous method of execution for high treason. The convicted was fastened by the feet to a hurdle, or wooden panel, and drawn behind a horse to the place of execution, where they were then hanged (almost to the point of death), emasculated, disembowelled, beheaded, and quartered.
Impalement	The penetration of the body by an object such as a stake, pole, spear, or hook, often by complete or partial perforation of the torso.
Keelhauling	European maritime punishment of dragging the victim against the barnacles on a ship (not usually intended to be lethal).
Mazzatello	Italian method of execution by inflicting head trauma using club or other blunt weapons.
Poisoning	Before modern times, sayak (사약, 賜藥) was the method used for nobles (yangban) and royals during the Joseon Dynasty in Korea due to the Confucianist belief that one may kill a seonbi but may not insult him (사가살불가욕, 士可殺不可辱). Poisoning by drinking an infusion of hemlock was used as a method of execution in Ancient Greece (e.g., the death of Socrates).
Sawing	Practiced by sawing or cutting a victim in half, either sagittally (usually midsagittally), or transversely.
Scaphism	An Ancient Persian method of execution in which the condemned was placed in between two boats, force-fed a mixture of milk and honey, and left floating in a stagnant pond. The victim would then suffer from severe diarrhoea, which would attract insects that would burrow and nest in the victim, eventually causing death from sepsis. Of disputed historicity.
Seppuku	Specifically the version practiced as capital punishment, exclusively against disgraced samurai who refused to commit suicide after being convicted. The condemned would simulate a cutting motion with a wooden replica of a Tantō dagger or a fan, and the kaishakunin would then behead them, effectively acting as the executioner.
Slow slicing	The methodical removal of portions of the body over an extended period of time, usually with a knife, eventually resulting in death. Sometimes known as "death by a thousand cuts".: Pendulum. A machine with an axe head for a weight that slices closer to the victim's torso over time (of disputed historicity).
Waist chop	A large blade affixed by a hinge to a board (resembling a large paper cutter) was aligned with the waist of the condemned; the knife was brought down, resulting in a hemicorporectomy. The condemned would typically die slowly of blood loss. Used in China up until the reign of the Yongzheng Emperor in the 18th century.

== See also ==
- Outline of capital punishment
- Capital punishment in Judaism
