= Capital punishment in Kuwait =

Capital punishment in Kuwait is legal. Hanging is the method of choice for civilian executions. However, shooting is a legal form of execution in certain circumstances.

== Capital offences ==
The long list of capital crimes under Kuwaiti civilian law includes aggravated murder, perjury resulting in death, destroying buildings belonging to the government or those known to be inhabited, rape, kidnapping, drug trafficking, and espionage.

Under the Kuwaiti Military Code, the following military offences may be punished with death: revealing classified information, cowardice, desertion, collaborationism, rebellion, insubordination, and interfering with action in the line of defence. As well as this, enemy soldiers can be executed if they commit war crimes or spy on the Kuwaiti military or government.

== Excused persons ==
The following offenders shall not be subject to capital punishment if found guilty of a capital offence:

- Pregnant women
- Women with small children
- Minors (under 18 years of age) at the time the crime was committed

These offenders will have their sentences reduced to life imprisonment. Mentally ill persons are excluded from this list because they cannot be held responsible for criminal charges under Kuwaiti law in any instance.

== Legal proceedings ==
=== Judicial review and appeal ===
After a person is sentenced to death in a Kuwaiti court, their case is automatically reviewed by the appellate court, of whom take into consideration the crime, evidence reviewed by the court, the previous convictions of defendant and other factors. If the court of appeal rejects this appeal, then they go to the court of cassation (Supreme Court) of which is the highest governing legal body in the country. Once it has been reviewed, the Emir of Kuwait must approve of the sentence. Once this occurs, an execution order is issued by the Chief Justice, specifying the date, time, place and method (usually hanging) of the execution, of which is given to the prosecutor.

=== Execution ===
Kuwait was a British protectorate and it became independent in 1961.

Since 2002, executions have occurred at Nayef Palace. Prisoners are held in solitary confinement until the day of their execution, where they are transported to the execution ground. At about 08:00, prisoners are hooded with a black hood, unlike the British style white hood and their arms and legs are pinioned (strapped). New steel gallows were fitted in the early 2000s and have been used for executions since then. A noose is put around their neck with the knot below the ear and the trapdoor is opened. They are given measured drops in order to break their necks, a development of the method practised in the United Kingdom. The press and public are allowed to view the bodies after the execution. The press have been reported to publish images of the dead bodies in newspapers to serve as a deterrent against crime.

Some prisoners are executed in public. For example, in 2013 Egyptian national also known as Hawally monster, was hanged in public. Some other people, including a Royal family member were also executed in public. In 2023, the person behind the 2015 Kuwait mosque attack was executed by hanging. He was hanged alongside a group of other criminals.
