= Capital punishment in Liberia =

Capital punishment is a legal penalty in Liberia. However, Liberia is classified as a state that is "abolitionist in practice." Liberia last executed in 2000.

Liberia acceded to the Second Optional Protocol to the International Covenant on Civil and Political Rights on 16 September 2005. However, Liberia expanded the scope of the death penalty in 2008, which was met with international criticism. Later, in July 2022, the Senate of Liberia passed a bill to abolish the death penalty.

There were no new death sentences in Liberia in 2021. There was estimated to be at least 16 people on death row at the end of 2021.
