= Capital punishment in Jordan =

Capital punishment is a legal penalty in Jordan. The country had a moratorium on capital punishment between 2006 and 2014. In late 2014 the moratorium was lifted and 11 people were executed. Two more executions followed in 2015, 15 executions took place in 2017 and one in 2021; six executions took place on one day in June 2026. The method of execution is hanging, although shooting was previously the sole method for carrying out executions.

== History ==
Between 2000 and the imposition of a moratorium in 2006 there were 41 executions, either for murder, terrorism or sexual offences. In 2005 King Abdullah II of Jordan stated that: "in coordination with the European Union, we would like to modify our Penal Code. Jordan could soon become the first country in the Middle East without capital punishment." A moratorium on the death penalty was subsequently imposed the following year. In 2008 and 2010, Jordan abstained from voting on the United Nations moratorium on the death penalty.

In November 2014, the Jordanian cabinet formed a committee to explore whether Jordan should reinstate the application of capital punishment. On 21 December 2014 11 persons were hanged, all men who were convicted of murder in 2005 and 2006. These were the first executions in the country since June 2006; 122 sentences of capital punishment had been handed out since. Shortly before the executions Interior Minister Hussein Al-Majali had stated that capital punishment might be reinstated due to a major debate on the subject, and with the public believing that a recent rise in crime was caused by non-application of the death penalty. The lifting of the moratorium was criticized by human rights organisations.

On 4 February 2015, shortly after discovering Jordanian pilot Muath al-Kasasbeh had been killed by the Islamic State, Jordan executed Sajida Mubarak Atrous al-Rishawi and Ziad Khalaf Raja al-Karbouly. Both had been convicted of terrorist offences.

In February 2016, local media reported that a government committee had recommended the execution of 13 offenders, out of 80 investigated cases.

15 people were executed on the morning of 4 March 2017; 10 were convicted of terrorism and the remaining 5 with "heinous" murder and rape of minors. Those convicted of terrorism were part of a bomb attack against the Jordanian embassy in Baghdad in 2003 that left dozens killed, an attack in Amman in 2006 in which a tourist was killed, a foiled terror plot in Irbid in 2016 that planned to bomb several civilian targets, an attack on intelligence officers in 2016 that left 5 dead and the assassination of Jordanian writer Nahed Hattar in 2016.

In 2017 there were a total of 120 people on death row, including 12 women.

On 3 August 2021, a Jordanian man was hanged for burning his Lebanese wife to death.

In 2022, the execution law was amended.

On 21 June 2026, six men were executed by hanging; all were charged with crimes involving the deaths of police or security officers.

== Capital crimes ==
Capital punishment is possible amongst others for murder, rape, terrorism, aggravated robbery, drug trafficking, illegal possession and use of weapons, war crimes, treason and espionage.

== Legal process ==
In the years shortly before 2008 most verdicts of capital punishment were handed out by the State Security Court. Cases in which capital punishment is sentenced receive an automatic appeal.

Article 93 of the Constitution of Jordan holds that "no death sentence may be carried out unless ratified by the King. Every such sentence shall be submitted to him by the Council of Ministers along with the council’s view on it." Several categories of persons are excluded from being subjected to capital punishment. These are those under the age of 18, pregnant women, the mentally ill and intellectually disabled.
