= Capital punishment in Ethiopia =

Ethiopia retains capital punishment while not ratified the Second Optional Protocol (ICCR) of UN General Assembly resolution. Historically, capital punishments was codified under Fetha Negest in order to fulfill societal desire. Death penalty can be applied through approval of the President, but executions are rare.

The latest execution was in 2007 of Major General Tsehai who killed Kinfe Gebremedhin, a close ally of Prime Minister Meles Zenawi. In 2020, The Advocates for Human Rights and World Coalition Against the Death Penalty reported that despite 211 people having been sentenced to death between 2009 and 2018, Ethiopia claimed to have not conducted any executions during this period. In 2019, Amnesty International reported that there were likely 10 people sentenced to death. Death sentence may apply not just to homicide but also non-violent crimes including incest, blasphemy, kidnapping of a betrothed girl or widow, and stealing animals like livestock.

Under Federal Criminal Code Article 122–128, Ethiopia ratified secondary punishments.

== Penalty overview ==
Currently, Ethiopia retains the death penalty and has not ratified the Second Optional Protocol to the International Covenant on Civil and Political Rights (ICCR).

In 2007, Major Tsehai was executed after his appeal for clemency to the Supreme Court was turned down. He was convicted of shooting Kinfe Gebremedhin, a close ally of Prime Minister Meles Zenawi, outside officer's club in 2001. The death sentence was approved by President Girma Wolde-Giorgis. Death penalty also occurred prior in the Eritrean–Ethiopian War in 1998, when the government executed Eritrean businessman for the shooting of a popular Ethiopian general.

Ethiopia opposes the UN General Assembly memorandum on the use of death penalty. The government also uses death penalty for non-violent crime, including terrorism "causing serious to historical or cultural heritages" and acting as an accessory to an offense that causes severe bodily injury.

Since 2019, Ethiopia has not formally shown to abolish capital punishment or ratify the Second Optional Protocol. In 2011 Concluding Observations, the Human Rights Committee expressed concern that Ethiopia authorizes the death penalty for "crimes which appear to have a political dimension", as well as to the most serious crimes and in compliance with article 14 of the Covenant. The committee also expressed its concern to human rights violations in Somali Region and calls for the government of Ethiopia to take action towards anti-terrorism legislation.

In 2019 Universal Periodic Review, Ethiopia received 15 recommendations to use the Second Optional Protocol or adopt as de facto memorandum on the death penalty. Based on Amnesty International reports in 2019, there were likely 10 people under sentence of death.

== In Ethiopian law ==
Historically, the Ethiopian society viewed capital punishment as a fundamental instrument for protection to society. They accept it as requital of those who commit great sin. These include homicide, incest, blasphemy, kidnapping of a betrothed girl or widow, and the stealing and of animals like horses or oxen. Death penalty can be applied through approval of the President, but executions are rare. Capital punishment for homicide serves two significant aims:

1. By sentencing to death penalty, the society hoped to recompense the bereaved victim. Fetha Negest provided:

They shall be put (to death) in the place they sinned, so that they may serve as a lesson to others who desire to be (involved) in this deed, and so that the relatives of the person murdered may be pleased.

2. The death penalty served as expiation of the murderer from sin. Referring to argument for retention of capital punishment, in the 1957 draft Penal Code, Jean Graven wrote:

It is not only necessary for social protection; it is based on the very deepest feelings of the Ethiopian people for justice and atonement. The destruction of life, the highest achievement of the Creator, can only be paid for by the sacrifice of the life of the guilty person.

== Notable cases ==
In June 2011, president Girma Wolde-Giyogis announced at the National Palace that the death penalty sentences for 23 senior Derg officials were commuted to life imprisonment. The decision had come to effect on 28 May 2011, coinciding with 20th anniversary of the downfall of the Derg junta.
