= Capital punishment in Mauritania =

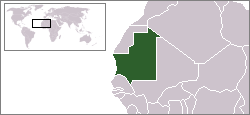
Location map for Mauritania, within Africa.

Capital punishment is a legal penalty in Mauritania. However, the country is considered "Abolitionist in Practice" because it has maintained a de facto moratorium on executions since 1987. The last known executions were carried out that year in connection with cases of treason and security-related crimes. Although courts have continued to issue death sentences, these sentences have not been implemented, and long-term imprisonment is typically substituted in practice.

== Legal Framework ==
Mauritania’s criminal law is heavily influenced by Islamic sharia, which, along with secular statutes, forms the basis of the penal code. The law includes capital punishment for a range of offenses categorized under both civil and religious provisions. Courts may issue death sentences for crimes such as premeditated murder, violent robbery, treason, terrorism, apostasy, certain sexual offenses, and, in some cases, drug trafficking.

The judiciary is composed of both civil courts and specialized Islamic courts, and capital cases often involve both criminal and religious-legal considerations.

Mauritania has a death penalty for homosexuality; However, the provision is not enforced, and Mauritania is not known to have carried out executions.

== Blasphemy and Religious Offenses ==
In 2018, the government passed a law making the death penalty mandatory for blasphemy and apostasy, removing previous provisions that allowed repentance as a mitigating factor. This legal change was part of broader reforms aimed at aligning legislation more closely with sharia and responding to domestic debates over religious expression. While individuals have been charged with blasphemy in recent years, the moratorium on executions means that no death penalty for blasphemy has been carried out.
