= Capital punishment in Nigeria =

Capital punishment is a legal penalty in Nigeria.

== Justification ==
The death penalty is authorised by Section 33 of the Constitution of Nigeria. Capital crimes are defined under several laws, namely the Criminal Code Act LFN (Laws of the Federation of Nigeria) 1990 (which is almost in pari materia with the various Criminal Code laws in southern Nigeria), the Penal Code Act LFN 1990 (in pari materia with the Penal Code operational in the various States in the Northern Part of the country), and the Robbery and Firearms Decree 1984. Offences punishable by death include armed robbery, murder, treason, treachery, capital perjury, and aiding suicide of a child or mentally ill person.

Pregnant women and people younger than 18 may not be sentenced to death. If convicted of a capital offence, they will instead be sentenced to life imprisonment.

== Methods ==
The methods of executions include hanging, firing squad, and lethal injection (since 2015).

== History ==
During the Nigerian military juntas of 1966–79 and 1983–98, the government executed its political opponents, most notoriously when General Sani Abacha ordered the execution of the Ogoni Nine by hanging in 1995.

== Present day ==
Since the transition to democracy in 1999, death sentences are often given but rarely carried out. After 2006, no executions took place until June 2013, when four prisoners on death row were hanged, although about a thousand other condemned prisoners were awaiting execution at the time. The last executions occurred in 2016, when three men were hanged for murder and armed robbery.

On 17 December 2014, after being found guilty of conspiracy to commit mutiny, 54 Nigerian soldiers were sentenced to death by firing squad. The trial was held secretly by a military tribunal.

The use of the death penalty in Nigeria has generated debate. In October 2014, former Delta State Governor Emmanuel Uduaghan pardoned three inmates who were on death row following the recommendations by the State Advisory Council on Prerogative of Mercy. In 2017, the Nigerian government rejected the call by Amnesty International to halt the planned execution of some inmates in Lagos State.

In May 2020, during the coronavirus pandemic, a court in Lagos used a video conferencing application to issue a death sentence.

In addition to executions carried out in accordance with the law, there are also extrajudicial executions in Nigeria. According to an estimate by the human rights group Global Rights, there were 800 extrajudicial executions in Nigeria in the period of 2020–2023.

== See also ==
- Crime in Nigeria
- Law of Nigeria
