= Capital punishment in Oman =

Capital punishment in Oman is a legal penalty. Under Omani law, capital offenses are murder, drug trafficking, arson, piracy, terrorism, kidnapping, recidivism of aggravated offenses punishable by life imprisonment, leading an armed group that engages in spreading disorder (such as by sabotage, pillage or killing), espionage, treason and perjury causing wrongful execution. Oman's last executions occurred in 2021. Oman voted against the United Nations moratorium on the death penalty in 2007, 2008, 2010, 2012, 2014, 2016, 2018, and 2020. Capital punishment in Oman is usually carried out by firing squad, however hanging is also permitted.
