= Capital punishment in the Maldives =

Capital punishment is a legal penalty in the Maldives, though the last execution was carried out in 1953, when the country was a British protectorate. The only legal method of execution is lethal injection. Crimes punishable by death include murder, adultery, apostasy, terrorism, and treason, though the punishment is not mandatory for any crime.

In 2014, the Maldives updated its existing death penalty regulations, which had been in place for 60 years, to allow the death penalty to be applied to children from the age of seven. Children who are sentenced to death can be legally executed once they turn 18. The change was condemned by the United Nations and the European Union.

In 2016, convicted murderer Hussain Humaam Ahmed was scheduled to be executed by lethal injection in the Maldives, but the execution was postponed following international calls for clemency. The execution was rescheduled twice in 2017 alongside the executions of two other people, though both dates passed without any executions taking place; no explanation was given regarding this. As of 2018 there were 18 individuals under a sentence of death in the Maldives.

The Maldives voted against the United Nations moratorium on the death penalty in 2007 and 2008, voted in favour in 2010, abstained from voting in 2012 and 2014, and voted against it again in 2016 and 2018. They continued to vote against it in 2020, 2022 and 2024.

In 2025, President Mohamed Muizzu initiated discussions to implement capital punishment for individuals convicted of drug trafficking. This move was opposed by many domestic and international organizations such as the Human Rights Watch, Amnesty International, Harm Reduction International, International Federation for Human Rights, and called for the rejection of the introduction of the death penalty.
