= Capital punishment in Libya =

Capital punishment in Libya remains a legal practice in the region and is implemented in both civil and military law. Libyan law states that every person sentenced to death will be executed by a firing squad. It was commonly used by the government of Muammar Gaddafi (who was himself ultimately summarily executed). However, the application of the death penalty in Libya has been inconsistent due to political uncertainty and conflict starting in 2011. The death penalty makes up more than 30 articles of Libya's penal code, providing a wide array of offenses punishable by death, including some that are related to freedom of speech and association.

== Legal Framework and Application ==
The legal system in Libya allows for the execution of capital punishment. The government maintains its usage for variety of different offenses. Libya continues its use of the death penalty in these ways.

- Article 3 of Law 71 on criminalizing partisanship, in which the death penalty can be applied to anyone who creates or supports a group condemned by the law; this includes all parties associated with this group, whether it be the people who manage it, fund it, or promote the said group. All group members will be regarded as equal regardless of their role or rank within the organization.
- Article 207 states that anyone who decides to extend ideas that challenge the country's laws, social system, or government structure, especially those who do so by using force, terror, or any other illegal methods, will be sentenced to death.

In present times, the Libyan government sentences those who are convicted of capital punishment to death by a firing squad; however, before the year 2000, those convicted of capital punishment would be executed by hanging.

It is understood that within Libyan law, there are certain parameters around those who can be executed. Article 8 of law number 41 states that juveniles between the ages of 14 and 18 who commit a crime that would normally be met with the death penalty will, instead of being executed, have their sentence reduced to a minimum of five years in prison, where they will follow a program focused on educating and reforming them so they can become responsible members of society. It is also to be noted that pregnant women are unable to be executed until 2 months after they deliver the baby.

Articles 435 and 437 of the Libyan code of criminal procedure state that executions are not warranted to be performed on public holidays or holy days, and after the execution has been performed, the law states that burial is not to be celebrated. However, relatives can request to bury the body themselves. Otherwise, this task will be performed by the government.

According to Libyan law, all death sentences enacted, including those of what was once the People's Court of Libya, whose jurisdiction has now been transferred to the ordinary criminal courts, must be approved by a Supreme Court ruling. Following the Supreme Court ruling, the Supreme Council for Judicial Authority must consent before an execution can be imposed.

== Support ==
Supporters of capital punishment say that in Libya, the use of capital punishment provides the potential to limit and deter crimes, particularly those with violent implications; with the frequent and ongoing conflicts and security challenges Libya faces, some argue that the death penalty plays an important part in maintaining national security and limiting acts of terrorism. The need to protect against violent extremists and organizations who are determined to undermine the state is often the justification for retaining capital punishment. Those in favor of capital punishment state that executing those who are convicted of crimes punishable by death prevents them from the ability ever to commit such acts again; it is also believed capital punishment is the only way to get retribution for crimes such as rape and murder.

== Opposition ==
Those critical of capital punishment in Libya show concerns for human rights, fair trials, and the executions of innocent people. Organizations such as Amnesty International and Human Rights Watch have continuously expressed their criticisms of Libya's justice system; they often choose to focus on Libya's inability to conduct justice in accordance with international standards. Human rights activists often use the case of the conviction of 30 al-Gaddafi-era officials, with 9 of these convictions containing capital punishment. Amnesty International believes that in many of the 30 or so defendants who were denied legal counsel, many of them were said to have been interrogated without the presence of any legal counsel, even though Libyan law provides anyone convicted of a crime that right. They also state that the claims of torture and mistreatment raised and placed upon the defense were often unfounded in evidence, as well as the defendants had asked to be represented by lawyers; however, they were only granted a lawyer after the trial had already commenced. The seemingly flawed trial of the al-Gaddafi-era officials presented by human rights groups appears to highlight specific problems with Libya's ability to serve justice, primarily due to many years of conflict faced within the region and lack of a central authority. Statements of a man sentenced to death along with six others in 2023 due to his conversion from Islam to Christianity have caused further scrutiny of the Libyan legal system. The lawyer who was convicted stated that he was forced to denounce Christianity under the threat of torture. Human rights activists say that allegations such as this one undermine the reliability of the evidence obtained by confessions, which further damages the reliability of the Libyan justice system. The usage of vaguely defined crimes pertaining to things such as freedom of expression and association as well as religious offense, such as the one six who were sentenced to death in 2023 for converting from Islam to Christianity, those opposed to the practice of capital punishment say that the usage of the death penalty in these ways gives those in power a tool to suppress a society.
