= Capital punishment by country =

Maintain the death penalty in both law and practice Permit its use for ordinary crimes, but have abolished it de facto, namely, according to Amnesty International standards, they have not used it for at least 10 years and are believed to have a policy or established practice of not carrying out executions Retain capital punishment only for exceptional crimes such as crimes under military law or crimes committed in exceptional circumstances Have completely abolished it

Capital punishment, also called the death penalty, is the state-sanctioned killing of a person as a punishment for a crime. It has historically been used in almost every part of the world. Since the mid-1800s, many countries have abolished or discontinued the practice. In 2024, the five countries that are known to have executed the most people were, in descending order, China (1,000+), Iran (972+), Saudi Arabia (345+), Iraq (63+), and Yemen (38+).

According to Amnesty International, countries fall into four categories based on their use of capital punishment. Specifically, as of 2025:

- 54 retain capital punishment in law and practice, to be reduced to 53 in 2026 following Lebanon's abolition of the death penalty.
- 23 retain capital punishment but have not used it in the last ten years and are believed to have a policy of not carrying out executions or have made a commitment not to do so.
- 9 retain capital punishment only for exceptional crimes such as crimes under military law or crimes committed in exceptional circumstances.
- 113 (including, according to Amnesty International's count, the Cook Islands, Kosovo, and Niue) have fully abolished capital punishment, to be raised to 114 with Lebanon in 2026.

From 2010 to 2019, 5 countries (Iran, Yemen, Saudi Arabia, Pakistan, and South Sudan) were recorded to have executed offenders who were minors (under 18) when the offence was committed, which is a breach of the Convention on the Rights of the Child (ratified by all countries except the United States). This ended in 2020 by royal decree in Saudi Arabia.

During 2025, executions increased by 78%, marking the highest annual number of executions since 1981. Significant increases were recorded in several countries, including Iran, which carried out at least 2,159 executions, more than double its 2024 total; Saudi Arabia, which carried out at least 356 executions; and Singapore, where executions nearly doubled compared to the previous year. Executions also resumed in Japan, Taiwan, and the United Arab Emirates following periods without reported executions.

== Global overview ==
=== Africa ===
Of the 54 UN member states located within Africa, 24 have fully abolished capital punishment, 3 retain capital punishment only in extraordinary circumstances (such as for treason, military offences, or offences committed during wartime), 14 retain capital punishment but have not used it in at least ten years, and 13 actively retain capital punishment. In 2018, Burkina Faso abolished capital punishment for ordinary (non-state) crimes, and Gambia announced a moratorium as a first step towards abolition. Sierra Leone fully abolished capital punishment in 2021, as did the Central African Republic in 2022, followed by Zambia in 2023.

=== Americas ===
Of the 35 UN member states located within the Americas, 16 have fully abolished capital punishment, 5 retain capital punishment only in extraordinary circumstances (such as for treason, military offences, or offences committed during wartime), 13 retain capital punishment but have not used it in at least ten years, and 1 actively retains capital punishment. Since 2008, the United States has been the only country in the Americas (and therefore also North America) to carry out executions. Capital punishment is legal in the federal government, military, 27 states (of which only 16 are considered retentionists; 7 are under moratoria and 4 are abolitionists-in-practice with no executions in over ten years), and 1 territory (American Samoa; considered an abolitionist-in-practice with no executions since 1939). Canada and Mexico have both fully abolished capital punishment. In the Caribbean, capital punishment has only been fully abolished by the Dominican Republic and Haiti (1969 and 1987, respectively). All other Caribbean countries are considered abolitionists-in-practice. In Central and South America, capital punishment has mostly been fully abolished, with the exceptions of Guatemala, El Salvador, Brazil, Peru, and Chile, which retain capital punishment in extraordinary circumstances (generally being for treason, military crimes, or crimes during wartime), and Belize and Guyana, which are both considered abolitionists-in-practice.

=== Asia ===
Of the 47 UN member states and 1 UN observer state located within Asia, 16 have fully abolished capital punishment, 1 retains capital punishment only in extraordinary circumstances (such as for treason, military offences, or offences committed during wartime), 8 retain capital punishment but have not used it in at least ten years, and 23 actively retain capital punishment. China is the world's most prolific executioner; according to Amnesty International, China executes more people than the rest of the world combined each year, but this does not apply in Hong Kong and Macau, since both special administrative regions have abolished capital punishment.

India occasionally executes criminals, carrying out just 30 executions from 1991 to 2020. India most recently executed 4 perpetrators of a 2012 Delhi gang rape and murder (the Nirbhaya case) in March 2020. Japan sometimes executes criminals, carrying out 134 executions since 1993. Japan most recently executed Takahiro Shiraishi in June 2025. According to a 2017 report by the National Human Rights Commission from Capital punishment in Myanmar, over 700 prisoners had their death sentences commuted to life imprisonment.

Singapore resumed executions in March 2022 after a two-year moratorium due to the COVID-19 pandemic. Singapore came under scrutiny for executing drug traffickers in several high-profile cases, including Nagaenthran Dharmalingam who was hanged in April 2022, and Tangaraju Suppiah who was hanged in April 2023. In July 2023, a convicted drug trafficker named Saridewi binte Djamani was executed, becoming the first female offender hanged in Singapore in 19 years, after the 2004 hanging of Yen May Woen. Singapore's first execution for murder since 2019 was carried out in February 2024, when Bangladeshi painter Ahmed Salim was hanged for murdering his ex-girlfriend in 2018.

Indonesia occasionally executes prisoners, and while it has rarely done so in cases of murder, Indonesia has some of the most stringent narcotics laws in the world, so it is often used for drug traffickers. In June 2025, a trial for three British citizens, following a deal to trade approximately one kilogram of cocaine, sees the accused potentially facing capital punishment. Taiwan executes inmates sporadically over the course of several years. The country retains capital punishment for the "most heinous" cases. In January 2025, Huang Lin-kai became the first prisoner to be put to death under President Lai Ching-te and the first since 2020.

=== Europe ===
Of the 43 UN member states and 1 UN observer state located within Europe, 42 have fully abolished capital punishment, 0 retain capital punishment only in extraordinary circumstances (such as for treason, military offences, or offences committed during wartime), 1 retains capital punishment but has not used it in at least ten years (Russia), and 1 actively retains capital punishment (Belarus). The European Union (EU) holds a strong position against capital punishment; its abolition is a key objective for the EU's human rights policy. Abolition is a pre-condition for membership in the EU. In Europe, only Belarus continues to actively use capital punishment.

Capital punishment has been completely abolished in all European countries except for Belarus and Russia, the latter of which has a moratorium and has not conducted an execution since 1996. The absolute ban on capital punishment is enshrined in both the Charter of Fundamental Rights of the European Union (EU) and two widely adopted protocols of the European Convention on Human Rights of the Council of Europe, and is thus considered a central value. Of all present European countries, San Marino, Portugal and the Netherlands were the first to abolish capital punishment; Romania banned it even earlier in 1864, but it was later reintroduced from 1936 to 1990 during the dictatorial and communist eras; Portugal also reintroduced the death penalty in 1916 for military crimes in wartime with a foreign country in the theatre of war, and only abolished it again in 1976; in Italy the nationwide ban on capital punishment dates from 1889 (it had previously not been in force in Tuscany alone since 1859, and even earlier for short periods starting from 1786), but it was then reintroduced during the fascist regime. The last execution in the United Kingdom took place in England in 1964, but the last sentence was passed nine years later; it was abolished for murder in 1965 and for the remaining offences in 1998. In 2012, Latvia became the most recent European country to abolish capital punishment.

=== Post-Soviet states ===
Russia retains the death penalty in law, but there has been a moratorium since 1996, making it de facto abolitionist. The last executions on Russian territory were carried out in 1999 in Chechnya, "which de facto was not then under control of the Russian Federation". Of the other former Soviet republics, only Belarus and Tajikistan have not formally abolished capital punishment, and only Belarus uses it in practice. In 2000, Ukraine abolished capital punishment, but it was promptly reintroduced by the so-called Donetsk and Luhansk People's Republics after their secession from Ukraine in 2014.

=== Oceania ===
Of the 14 UN member states located within Oceania, 13 have fully abolished capital punishment, 0 retain capital punishment only in extraordinary circumstances (such as for treason, military offences, or offences committed during wartime), 1 retains capital punishment but has not used it in at least ten years, and 0 actively retain capital punishment. The last UN member state that has not yet fully abolished capital punishment is Tonga, which has not used it since 1982 and is therefore an abolitionist-in-practice.

=== Human Development Index ===
There are 73 sovereign states with a very high human development according to the 2023 Human Development Index list. Of these:

- 11 (15.07 %) actively retain capital punishment: Bahrain, Belarus, Japan, Kuwait, Malaysia, Oman, Qatar, Saudi Arabia, Singapore, the United Arab Emirates, and the United States.
- 8 (10.96 %) permit its use, but have not used it for at least 10 years and are believed to have a policy or established practice of not carrying out executions: Antigua and Barbuda, the Bahamas, Barbados, Brunei, Russia, Saint Kitts and Nevis, South Korea, and Trinidad and Tobago.
- 2 (2.74 %) have abolished it for all crimes except those committed under exceptional circumstances (such as during war): Chile and Israel.
- 52 (71.23 %) have completely abolished it: Albania, Andorra, Argentina, Armenia, Australia, Austria, Belgium, Bosnia and Herzegovina, Bulgaria, Canada, Costa Rica, Croatia, Cyprus, Czechia, Denmark, Estonia, Finland, France, Georgia, Germany, Greece, Hungary, Iceland, Ireland, Italy, Kazakhstan, Latvia, Liechtenstein, Lithuania, Luxembourg, Macedonia, Malta, Mauritius, Montenegro, the Netherlands, New Zealand, Norway, Panama, Poland, Portugal, Romania, San Marino, Serbia, Seychelles, Slovakia, Slovenia, Spain, Sweden, Switzerland, Turkey, the United Kingdom, and Uruguay.

Singapore has both the highest Human Development Index and planetary pressures–adjusted HDI of all the countries that retain capital punishment, while the United Arab Emirates has the highest inequality-adjusted HDI.

=== Advanced economies ===
As of 2022, 33 of the 37 UN member states that are classified by the IMF as advanced economies have fully abolished capital punishment. The United States, Japan, and Singapore actively retain capital punishment and Israel retains capital punishment crimes only in extraordinary circumstances (such as for treason, military offences, or offences committed during wartime, as well as, since 2026, for murder for terrorist purposes by non-Israeli residents of the West Bank, or committed with the intent "to deny the existence of the State of Israel").

=== Executions in 2024 ===
Fifteen UN member states were recorded to have performed executions in 2024:

- Americas (1 country): United States (25)
- Asia (12 countries): China (1 000s), Iran (972+), Saudi Arabia (345+), Iraq (63+), Yemen (38+), Singapore (9), Kuwait (6), Oman (3), Afghanistan (unknown), North Korea (unknown), Syria (unknown), Vietnam (unknown)
- Africa (2 countries): Somalia (34+), Egypt (13)

Precise numbers are unavailable for some countries, so the total number of executions is unknown.

=== Executions in 2025 ===
During 2025, executions increased by 78%.

- Asia-Pacific: Afghanistan (6), Japan (1), Singapore (17), Taiwan (1)
- Middle East and North America: Iran (2,159), Egypt (23), Iraq (18), Kuwait (17), Saudi Arabia (356), UAE (4), Yemen (51), USA (47)

== Capital punishment by continent ==
=== Africa ===
There are 54 United Nations member states in Africa. Of these:

- 13 (24.07 %) retain capital punishment.
- 14 (25.93 %) retain capital punishment but have not used it in the last ten years and are believed to have a policy of not carrying out executions or have made a commitment not to do so.
- 3 (5.55 %) retain capital punishment only in extraordinary circumstances (such as for treason, military offences, or offences committed during wartime).
- 24 (44.44 %) have fully abolished capital punishment.

The countries in Africa that most recently abolished the death penalty are Zambia (2023), Central African Republic (2022), and Sierra Leone (2021).

Executions in Africa in 2024: Somalia (34+), Egypt (13).

P: Retained in law and practice
L: Retained in law but have not used it in the last ten years and are believed to have a policy of not carrying out executions or have made a commitment not to do so.
E: Retain capital punishment only for exceptional crimes such as crimes under military law or crimes committed in exceptional circumstances
A: Fully abolished

Key	Country	Last execution	Executions in 2024	Year abolished	Notes
L	Algeria	1993		N/A	Main article: Capital punishment in Algeria Firing squad, shooting. Capital punishment for treason; espionage; aggravated murder; destruction of territory; sabotage of public and economic utilities; counterfeiting; terrorism; torture; kidnapping; aggravated theft; some military offences; attempting a capital offence; some cases of recidivism; capital perjury. Currently under a moratorium. On 20 December 2012, Algeria co-sponsored and voted in favour of the Resolution on a Moratorium on the Use of the Death Penalty at the UN General Assembly.
A	Angola	1977		1992	Main article: Capital punishment in Angola Abolished in 1992 by the Constitution.
A	Benin	1987		2012	Main article: Capital punishment in Benin On 6 July 2012, Benin acceded to the Second Additional Protocol to the International Covenant on Civil and Political Rights which makes Benin abolitionist. The decision was upheld by the Constitutional Court in January 2016 although capital punishment is still present in statutes.
P	Botswana	2021		N/A	Main article: Capital punishment in Botswana Hanging. Capital punishment for murder; espionage; treason; attempted murder of the head of state; mutiny; desertion in the face of the enemy; aggravated piracy; terrorism. Persons excused from capital punishment are pregnant women, teenagers who were younger than 18 at time of crime, and the mentally ill.
E	Burkina Faso	1988		2018 Civilian crimes. N/A Military.	Main article: Capital punishment in Burkina Faso Capital punishment for war crimes. Abolished for other offences in 2018.
A	Burundi	2000		2009	Main article: Capital punishment in Burundi Abolished in 2009 by Penal Code. (Loi n°1/05 du 22 avril 2009 portant révision du Code pénal).
L	Cameroon	1997		N/A	Main article: Capital punishment in Cameroon Hanging, firing squad, shooting. Capital punishment for secession; espionage; treason; terrorism; aggravated murder; robbery; attempt of a capital crime; conspiracy to commit a capital crime; plundering by gangs using force during times of war; incitement to war. In February 2014, the President of the Republic, Paul Biya, commuted all condemned prisoners to life. However, death sentences have continued to be handed down as of 2016.
A	Cape Verde	*None since independence in 1975 (1835, before independence)		1981	Main article: Capital punishment in Cape Verde Last execution was in 1835 when Cape Verde was a colony of Portugal. Abolished in 1981 by the Constitution.
A	Central African Republic	1981		2022	Main article: Capital punishment in the Central African Republic Abolished in 2022.
A	Chad	2015		2020	Main article: Capital punishment in Chad Capital punishment was abolished in 2014, but then reintroduced the following year for terrorism. In April 2020, Chad's parliament unanimously re-abolished capital punishment.
P	Comoros	1997		N/A	Main article: Capital punishment in the Comoros Firing squad. Capital punishment for murder; torture; aggravated rape. Persons excluded from capital punishment are pregnant women, women with small children, offenders under 18 at the time of the crime, and the mentally ill.
A	Congo, Republic of the	1982		2015	Main article: Capital punishment in the Republic of the Congo Abolished in 2015 by the Constitution.
P	Congo, Democratic Republic of the	2003		N/A	Main article: Capital punishment in the Democratic Republic of the Congo Hanging, shooting. Capital punishment for murder; treason; terrorism; armed robbery; drug trafficking; espionage; misappropriation by a public prosecutor of seized or confiscated goods in time of war; military offences; war crimes; crimes against humanity.
A	Djibouti	*None since independence in 1977		1995	Main article: Capital punishment in Djibouti Abolished in 1995.
P	Egypt	2024	13+	N/A	Main article: Capital punishment in Egypt Hanging and firing squad. Capital punishment for treason; murder; terrorism; espionage; aggravated rape; drug trafficking; capital perjury. Excused from death are: women with small children, pregnant women, teenagers who were under 18 at the time of the crime, and the mentally ill. Since 2015, there have been reports of at least 354 executions; however, numbers are unreliable due to the government's secrecy.
E	Equatorial Guinea	2014		2022 Civilian crimes. N/A Military.	Main article: Capital punishment in Equatorial Guinea On 19 September 2022, President Teodoro Obiang Nguema Mbasogo signed a new penal code into law that abolished the death penalty for most crimes; however, statutes still permit capital punishment for some military offences.
L	Eritrea	1989		N/A	Main article: Capital punishment in Eritrea Hanging, shooting. Capital punishment for treason; espionage; murder; armed robbery; economic crimes; military offences; war crimes; genocide. At least one execution may have been carried out between 1999 and 2008, but this remains unconfirmed.
L	Eswatini	1983		N/A	Main article: Capital punishment in Eswatini Capital punishment for murder; treason.
P	Ethiopia	2007		N/A	Main article: Capital punishment in Ethiopia Firing squad. Capital punishment for treason; terrorism; espionage; murder; aggravated robbery; some economic crimes; certain military offences; war crimes; genocide; attempted capital offences.
A	Gabon	1985		2010	Main article: Capital punishment in Gabon Abolished in 2010.
P	Gambia	2012		N/A	Main article: Capital punishment in the Gambia Hanging, firing squad. Capital punishment for treason; murder; terrorism. Capital punishment was abolished in 1993 but was reinstated by Armed Forces Provisional Ruling Council in August 1995 In February 2018, Gambia announced a moratorium on the death penalty. In September 2018, it ratified the Second Optional Protocol to the International Covenant on Civil and Political Rights. In May 2019, it commuted 22 death sentences to life imprisonment.
L	Ghana	1993		2023 Civilian crimes. N/A Military.	Main article: Capital punishment in Ghana Firing squad, hanging. Capital punishment for treason. In 2023, the parliament voted to abolish capital punishment for all other crimes. The repeal of is not retroactive; at least one death sentence was handed down after abolition for a conviction secured before the repeal went into effect.
A	Guinea	2001		2017	Main article: Capital punishment in Guinea Abolished 2016 for ordinary crimes, 2017 for all crimes.
A	Guinea-Bissau	1986		1993	Main article: Capital punishment in Guinea-Bissau Abolished 1993 by the Constitution.
A	Ivory Coast	*None since independence in 1960		2000	Main article: Capital punishment in Ivory Coast
L	Kenya	1987		N/A	Main article: Capital punishment in Kenya Hanging. Capital punishment for terrorism; treason; murder; armed robbery;; military offences; capital perjury. On 3 August 2009, the death sentences of all 4 000 death row inmates were commuted to life imprisonment, and government studies were ordered to determine if the death penalty has any impact on crime. In 2017 the Supreme Court of Kenya struck down mandatory capital punishment as unconstitutional.
P	Lesotho	1995		N/A	Main article: Capital punishment in Lesotho Hanging. Capital punishment for murder; treason; rape; military offences.
L	Liberia	2000		N/A	Main article: Capital punishment in Liberia Hanging. Capital punishment for aggravated murder; armed robbery; terrorism; aircraft hijacking; treason; espionage. Liberia acceded to the Second Optional Protocol to the International Covenant on Civil and Political Rights, abolishing the death penalty, on 16 September 2005; it reintroduced elements of it in July 2008.
P	Libya	2010		N/A	Main article: Capital punishment in Libya Firing squad. Capital punishment for treason; aggravated murder; terrorism; drug trafficking; espionage; military offences. Extrajudicial killings are commonplace in Libya. Amnesty International said that Libyan human rights organizations reported 31 executions from 2018 and 2020, but this is not confirmed.
A	Madagascar	*None since independence in 1960 (1958, before independence)		2014	Main article: Capital punishment in Madagascar Abolished in 2014. Earlier, on 24 September 2012, Madagascar had signed the Second Optional Protocol to the International Covenant on Civil and Political Rights.
L	Malawi	1992		N/A	Main article: Capital punishment in Malawi Hanging. Capital punishment for murder; rape; aggravated robbery; burglary; treason; military offences. Capital punishment was briefly abolished in 2021, but reinstated the same year.
L	Mali	1980		N/A	Main article: Capital punishment in Mali Firing squad. Capital punishment for aggravated murder; terrorism; aggravated robbery; arson; kidnapping; treason; espionage; certain military offences; crimes against humanity; torture; attempt of a capital crime. Currently, no individual has been executed since 1980, making Mali a de facto abolitionist country.
L	Mauritania	1987		N/A	Main article: Capital punishment in Mauritania Capital punishment for homosexuality, sodomy, apostasy (no recorded executions), blasphemy, adultery, murder, terrorism, torture, rape, armed robbery, attempted armed robbery, arson, accomplice to a capital crime, espionage, treason, capital perjury.
A	Mauritius	1987		1995	Main article: Capital punishment in Mauritius
L	Morocco	1993		N/A	Main article: Human rights in Morocco § Capital punishment and imprisonment Capital punishment for terrorism, treason, espionage, corruption, perjury causing wrongful execution and aggravated murder. In December 2013, a parliamentary opposition group filed a bill to abolish capital punishment in Morocco. The MP who introduced the bill said he was "optimistic" about the bill passing "in view of the current reform movement in Morocco".
A	Mozambique	1986		1990	Main article: Capital punishment in Mozambique Abolished in 1990 by the Constitution.
A	Namibia	*None since independence in 1990 (1988, before independence)		1990	Main article: Capital punishment in Namibia Last execution when occupied by South Africa was in 1988. Abolished in 1990 by the Constitution.
L	Niger	1976		N/A	Main article: Capital punishment in Niger Firing squad. Capital punishment for aggravated murder; terrorism; robbery; treason; espionage; genocide; crimes against humanity; torture; human trafficking; harbouring fugitives; capital perjury; attempt of a capital crime; some recidivism. Abolitionist de facto as the last execution took place in 1976.
P	Nigeria	2016		N/A	Main article: Capital punishment in Nigeria Capital punishment for murder; treason; rape; robbery; incest; assisting the suicide of a person legally unable to consent; capital perjury; terrorism; some military offences; kidnapping..
A	Rwanda	1998		2007	Main article: Capital punishment in Rwanda Abolished in 2007.
A	São Tomé and Príncipe	*None since independence in 1975		1990	Abolished in 1990 by the Constitution.
A	Senegal	1967		2004	Main article: Capital punishment in Senegal
A	Seychelles	*None since independence in 1976		1993	Main article: Capital punishment in Seychelles Abolished in 1993 by the Constitution.
A	Sierra Leone	1998		2021	Main article: Capital punishment in Sierra Leone Abolished in 2021.
P	Somalia	2024	34+	N/A	Main article: Capital punishment in Somalia Hanging, firing squad or stoning. Somalia is the only African state that carries out public executions. The Transitional Federal Government laws allowed for execution (in the limited area of the country it used to control) for murder, terrorism, treason, espionage, homosexuality, some military offences, blasphemy, apostasy and adultery.
A	South Africa	1989		1995	Main article: Capital punishment in South Africa The last execution by the South African government was on 14 November 1989. Capital punishment was declared unconstitutional by the Constitutional Court on 6 June 1995 in the case of S v Makwanyane and Another. In 1997 the Criminal Law Amendment Act formally removed the invalidated provisions from statutes, and made provision for the resentencing of prisoners previously sentenced to death. On 25 May 2005, the Constitutional Court ordered that all remaining death sentences in the country be set aside and the prisoners resentenced as soon as possible.
P	South Sudan	2025		N/A	Main article: Capital punishment in South Sudan Capital punishment for treason; murder; capital perjury; attempted murder causing injury by a person sentenced to life for a previous murder; aggravated drug trafficking.
P	Sudan	2025		N/A	Main article: Capital punishment in Sudan Garrotte. Death penalty for waging war against the state, prostitution, drug trafficking, treason, capital perjury, espionage, murder, armed robbery, abetting the suicide of an individual unable to give legal consent, terrorism, rape and incest committed by a married offender.
L	Tanzania	1994		N/A	Main article: Capital punishment in Tanzania Capital punishment for murder; treason; military offences; mutiny by prison officers.
A	Togo	1978		2009	Main article: Capital punishment in Togo
L	Tunisia	1990		N/A	Main article: Capital punishment in Tunisia Capital punishment for treason; murder; terrorism; treason; espionage; rape; arson; military offences; attempt of a capital crime; assault on a judge with threat or use of a weapon. On 6 January 2014, the National Constituent Assembly (NCA) voted for maintaining capital punishment in the upcoming constitution in Tunisia. The votes were by 135 yes out of a total of 174. Since 2015, it has been possible to give the death penalty for terrorism.
P	Uganda	2005		N/A	Main article: Capital punishment in Uganda Capital punishment for murder; terrorism; kidnapping; rape; aggravated homosexuality; treason; some military offences. In 2009, the Supreme Court upheld a 2005 Constitutional Court ruling that although the death penalty was constitutional, its use as a mandatory punishment for certain crimes was not. In 2019 mandatory death penalty was abolished by law.
A	Zambia	1997		2022 Civilian crimes. 2023 All crimes.	Main article: Capital punishment in Zambia In 2022, president Hakainde Hichilema signed into law a bill abolishing the death penalty for most crimes, though capital punishment still remained in military statutes until 2023. Acceded to the Second Optional Protocol to the ICCPR in 2024.
E	Zimbabwe	2005		2024 Civilian crimes. N/A Military.	Main article: Capital punishment in Zimbabwe A bill to abolish the death penalty for ordinary crimes received cabinet approval in February 2024. President Emmerson Mnangagwa approved the law on December 31, 2024, but an amendment to the law retains the death penalty for crimes committed during a state of emergency.

=== Americas ===
There are 35 United Nations member states in the Americas. Of these:

- 13 (37.14 %) retain capital punishment but have not used it in the last ten years and are believed to have a policy of not carrying out executions or have made a commitment not to do so.
- 1 (2.86 %) retains capital punishment.
- 5 (14.29 %) retain capital punishment only in extraordinary circumstances (such as for treason, military offences, or offences committed during wartime).
- 16 (45.71 %) have fully abolished capital punishment.

Executions in the Americas in 2024: United States (25).

As of 2026, the United States is the only country in the Americas to conduct executions. Capital punishment applies nationwide on the federal level and in the military. However, most capital crimes are prosecuted at the state level. Twenty-three of the fifty states and the District of Columbia have abolished capital punishment entirely. Seven states have imposed moratoria, and four others are classifiable as "abolitionists-in-practice" according to the United Nations criteria, having passed a period of over ten years without executions.

Outside of the United States, the last execution elsewhere in the Americas was in Saint Kitts and Nevis in 2008. The countries in the Americas that most recently abolished the death penalty are Suriname (2015), Argentina (2009), and Bolivia (2009). Guatemala abolished the death penalty for civilian cases in 2017.

Executions in the Americas in 2019: United States (22).

P: Retained in law and practice
L: Retained in law but have not used it in the last ten years and are believed to have a policy of not carrying out executions or have made a commitment not to do so.
E: Retain capital punishment only for exceptional crimes such as crimes under military law or crimes committed in exceptional circumstances
A: Fully abolished

Key	Country	Last execution	Executions in 2024	Year abolished	Notes
P	Antigua and Barbuda	1991		N/A	Hanging. Death penalty for murder and treason. Currently, no individual is under the sentence of death, as the last death sentence in the country was commuted in 2016.
A	Argentina	1956		1984 Civilian. 2009 Military.	Main article: Capital punishment in Argentina Constitution of 1853 states "The penalty of death for political offences, all kinds of torture, and flogging, are forever abolished." And was completely abolished by the Penal Code of 30 April 1922. Despite this it was reinstated on several occasions by military dictatorships: Between 6 September 1930 by martial law until 20 February 1932.; Between 9 June 1956 by martial law imposing summary executions and abolished on 13 June 1956.; Between 2 June 1970 and abolished on 27 May 1973.; Between 25 June 1976 and finally abolished on 9 August 1984.; On 26 August 2008, a new Code of Military Justice was promulgated that abolished death penalty. The new Code came into effect six months later, on 26 February 2009.
P	Bahamas	2000		N/A	Main article: Capital punishment in the Bahamas Hanging. Capital punishment for treason; piracy; murder. Currently no individual is under the sentence of death, as the last death sentence in the country was commuted in 2016.
P	Barbados	1984		N/A	Capital punishment for murder; terrorism; participating in a mutiny; treason; espionage. Presently under review before the IACHR despite strong national support.
P	Belize	1985		N/A	Capital punishment for murder; crimes against humanity; some military offences; treason.
A	Bolivia	1973		2009	Main article: Capital punishment in Bolivia Abolished for ordinary crimes in 1997. In 2009, the abolition was extended to all crimes by the first paragraph of Article 15 of the new Constitution, which stipulates, among other things: "the death penalty does not exist in Bolivia."
E	Brazil	1876		1978 Civilian. N/A Military.	Main article: Capital punishment in Brazil Firing squad. Brazil has always maintained the death penalty in wartime as part of its Military Code but, after Brazil became a Republic in 1889, capital punishment for civilian offenses or for military offences committed in peacetime was abolished by the first republican Constitution, adopted in 1891. The penalty for crimes committed in peacetime was then reinstated during two periods (from 1938 to 1946 and from 1969 to 1978), but on those occasions it was restricted to acts of terrorism or subversion considered "internal warfare". The current Constitution of Brazil (1988) expressly forbids the use of capital punishment, except for military offences committed during a war duly declared by Congress. The last person to suffer the death penalty in Brazil was executed in 1876, during the Imperial era. After 1876, Emperor Pedro II adopted in practice an abolitionist policy, by directing that all death sentences be submitted by the Courts to the Imperial Government for examination regarding commutation (even without a request for pardon or commutation from the person condemned), and by granting commutations for all death sentences that were passed. For more information see Capital punishment in Brazil.
A	Canada	1962		1976 Civilian 1999 Military	Main article: Capital punishment in Canada Abolished in 1976 for murder, treason, and piracy (last execution in 1962, last sentence in 1976); abolished 1999 for military offences (last execution in 1945).
E	Chile	1985		2001 Civilian. N/A Military.	Main article: Capital punishment in Chile Shooting. Death penalty remains applicable to military personnel for war crimes and crimes against humanity during wartime. Abolished for all other cases in 2001.
A	Colombia	1907		1910	Main article: Capital punishment in Colombia Abolished in 1910 by Constitutional reform. Prohibited by the Colombian Constitution of 1991: "The right to life is inviolable. There will be no death penalty."
A	Costa Rica	1859		1877	Main article: Capital punishment in Costa Rica Abolished in 1877 by the Constitution.
P	Cuba	2003		N/A	Main article: Capital punishment in Cuba Firing squad. Death penalty for murder, attempted murder, hijacking, acts of terrorism, treason, espionage, political offenses, child rape, molestation of a child under 12 years of age with aggravating factors, rape of an adult with aggravating factors, rape of an adult that results in death, illness or grievous bodily harm, robbery with aggravating factors, drug offenses, production of child pornography, child trafficking, child prostitution, child corruption, piracy, working as a mercenary, apartheid, genocide, pedophilia. While there have been no executions since 2003, and the last death sentences were commuted by the Supreme Court in 2010, with nobody sentenced to death since then, there is no formal or informal moratorium or abolitionist policy, making the country still retentionist.
P	Dominica	1986		N/A	Executions by hanging. Death penalty for aggravated murder and treason.
A	Dominican Republic	1887?		1924	Prohibited in 1924 by Article 6, point 1 of the Constitution (the ban was subsequently reaffirmed by the 1966 and 1992 Constitutions). No legal executions are recorded for the 20th century, yet the period was marked by thousands of summary executions and political murders carried out outside of any legal process.
A	Ecuador	1884		1906	Abolished 1906 by the Constitution.
E	El Salvador	1973		1983 Civilian. N/A Military.	Main article: Capital punishment in El Salvador May be imposed only in cases provided by military laws during a state of international war. Abolished for other crimes in 1983.
L	Grenada	1978		N/A	Main article: Capital punishment in Grenada
E	Guatemala	2000		2017 Civilian. N/A Military.	Main article: Capital punishment in Guatemala Lethal injection. Until 2017, death penalty for murder, espionage, treason, drug trafficking, kidnapping, torture, and terrorism. Abolished for civilian cases in 2017.
P	Guyana	1997		N/A	Main article: Capital punishment in Guyana Death penalty for terrorist acts; murder, treason and armed robbery, piracy, drug trafficking, and terrorist offences resulting in death. While the constitution states that the death penalty is not a mandatory punishment, many provisions of the criminal code suggests that the death penalty may be mandatory for these crimes as no alternatives to such sentence of death is found under any law.
A	Haiti	1972		1987	Abolished in 1987 by the Constitution.
A	Honduras	1940		1956	Abolished in 1956 by the Constitution.
P	Jamaica	1988		N/A	Main article: Capital punishment in Jamaica Death penalty for murder.
A	Mexico	1957 Civilian; 1961 Military		2005	Main article: Capital punishment in Mexico Abolished for all crimes in 2005.
A	Nicaragua	1930		1979	Abolished in 1979 by the Constitution.
A	Panama	1903		1918	Abolished 1918 with amendments to the Constitution. In 1909, Adolphus Coulson was executed in the Panama Canal Zone, which was under U.S. jurisdiction.
A	Paraguay	1917		1992	Main article: Capital punishment in Paraguay Abolished in 1992 by the Constitution.
E	Peru	1979		1979 Civilian. N/A Military.	Main article: Capital punishment in Peru Firing squad. Death penalty for treason; terrorism; espionage; genocide; mutiny; desertion in times of war. Abolished for other crimes 1979.
P	Saint Kitts and Nevis	2008		N/A	Main article: Capital punishment in Saint Kitts and Nevis Hanging. Death penalty for murder and treason.
P	Saint Lucia	1995		N/A	Hanging. Death penalty for murder; treason.
P	Saint Vincent and the Grenadines	1995		N/A	Death penalty for murder; treason.
A	Suriname	1982		2015	Main article: Capital punishment in Suriname Abolished in 2015 by the Constitution.
P	Trinidad and Tobago	1999		N/A	Main article: Capital punishment in Trinidad and Tobago Death penalty for murder; treason
P	United States	2026	25	N/A Some states and most territories have abolished.	Main article: Capital punishment in the United States See also: Capital punishment in American Samoa and Capital punishment in Puerto Rico Lethal injection; electric chair; firing squad; inert gas asphyxiation. Capital punishment for murder; espionage; treason; terrorism. 27 of the 50 states currently have the death penalty, though 7 are under moratorium and 4 have not conducted any executions in decades. Of the territories, only American Samoa retains it despite no executions since 1939. The Supreme Court has restricted the crimes that capital punishment can be applied to. It has also prohibited capital punishment against those who committed a capital crime when under 18. Sentences of death may be handed down by a jury or a judge (upon a bench trial or a guilty plea).
A	Uruguay	1902		1907	Main article: Capital punishment in Uruguay Abolished by the "Law No. 3238" on 23 September 1907 and by the Constitution of 1918.
A	Venezuela	*None since independence in 1830		1863	Main article: Capital punishment in Venezuela Abolished 1863 by the Constitution.

=== Asia ===
There are 47 United Nations member states in Asia, and 1 observer state. Of these:

- 27 (56.25 %) retain capital punishment.
- 5 (10.42 %) retain capital punishment but have not used it in the last ten years and are believed to have a policy of not carrying out executions or have made a commitment not to do so.
- 16 (33.33 %) have fully abolished capital punishment.

Executions in Asia in 2024: China (1 000s), Iran (972+), Saudi Arabia (345+), Iraq (63+), Yemen (38+), Singapore (9), Kuwait (6), Oman (3), Afghanistan (unknown), North Korea (unknown; likely tens to just over a hundred), Syria (unknown), Vietnam (unknown). This does not include Taiwan, which is not a UN member state. Taiwan practises capital punishment by shooting, and conducted one execution each in 2016, 2018, 2020, and 2025.

On 25 July 2022, due to the Burmese civil war between the military junta (who rule most areas of the country) and the civilian government it overthrew, the junta carried out executions making them the first executions since 1988, making the country retentionist in areas controlled by the Tatmadaw. Under the civilian government (who internationally and according to the UN remain the legal government) and in areas controlled by it the country continues to be abolitionist in practice. Iraq also has a regional variety of retentionism and abolitionism, as the Kurdistan Region is de facto abolitionist due to a moratorium that has been in place since 2007. The rest of Iraq is retentionist.

Indonesia has an informal moratorium and Malaysia a formal one, both in place since 2018. In April 2023, legislation abolishing the mandatory death penalty was passed in Malaysia. The countries in Asia that most recently abolished capital punishment are Lebanon (2026), Kazakhstan (2021), and Mongolia (2017). In 2019, Asia had the world's five leading executioners: China, Iran, North Korea, Saudi Arabia, and Vietnam. Executions in Asia took place in 2019 in the following countries: Bahrain (3), Bangladesh (2), China (1000+), Iran (256+), Japan (3), North Korea (unknown), Pakistan (20+), Saudi Arabia (184+), Singapore (4), Syria (unknown), Vietnam (unknown), Yemen (7+).

P: Retained in law and practice
L: Retained in law but have not used it in the last ten years and are believed to have a policy of not carrying out executions or have made a commitment not to do so.
E: Retain capital punishment only for exceptional crimes such as crimes under military law or crimes committed in exceptional circumstances
A: Fully abolished

Key	Country	Last execution	Executions in 2024	Year abolished	Notes
P	Afghanistan	2021		N/A	Main article: Capital punishment in Afghanistan Hanging; shooting. Capital punishment for murder, arson, terrorism, treason, espionage, zina, apostasy, blasphemy. Categories of persons excused from capital punishment are teenagers who were under 18 at time of crime, and pregnant women.
A	Armenia	*None since independence on 21 September 1991 (30 August 1991, before independence)		1998	Main article: Capital punishment in Armenia Abolished in 1998 by the constitution.
A	Azerbaijan	1993		1998	Main article: Capital punishment in Azerbaijan
P	Bahrain	2019		N/A	Hanging; firing squad. Capital punishment for aggravated murder; rape; kidnapping; arson; assault; deliberately obstructing funerals or memorial services; certain crimes against property, transportation or agriculture under aggravating circumstances; terrorism; treason; defiance of military orders in time of war or martial law; capital perjury; drug trafficking; espionage.
P	Bangladesh	2025		N/A	Main article: Capital punishment in Bangladesh Hanging. Capital punishment for murder; drug trafficking; kidnapping; human trafficking; terrorism; rape; armed robbery; sedition; sabotage; some military offences; attempting a capital crime; capital perjury; espionage; treason; war crimes.
A	Bhutan	1974		2004	Main article: Capital punishment in Bhutan
L	Brunei	*None since independence in 1984 (1957, before independence)		N/A	Main article: Capital punishment in Brunei Hanging. Capital punishment for murder; unlawful possession of firearms and explosives; drug trafficking; terrorism; abetting the suicide of a person unable to give legal consent; arson; kidnapping; abetting mutiny; treason; capital perjury; zina; apostasy; blasphemy.
P	Myanmar	September 2024		N/A	Main article: Capital punishment in Myanmar Capital punishment for murder; terrorism; abetting mutiny; assault by a person under a life sentence causing harm; attempted murder; capital perjury; treason; drug trafficking. Myanmar has carried out no executions since 23 september 2024 when Maung Kaung Htet and his wife Chan Myae Thu were put to death. It is unknown whether five other pro-democracy activists – Kaung Pyae Sone Oo, Zeyar Phyo, Hsann Min Aung, Kyaw Win Soe and Myat Phyo Myint – who were scheduled to be executed on 24 September were actually put to death and when. While Burmese courts do hand down death sentences pro forma in particularly egregious cases, most recently in the 2018 case of Myo Zaw Oo who was convicted of the rape and murder of a government worker, the sentences in practice are not carried out and are in effect life sentences. There have been three major amnesties (1989, 1993, 1997) in which the government commuted death sentences to life sentences or less, and simultaneously reduced life sentences to 10 years. However, prisoners held for political crimes, or crimes against the state are typically excluded from such amnesties. Prior to the military coup of 2021, Myanmar was regarded as "abolitionist in practice" by both Amnesty International and Death Penalty Watch. This was jeopardised on 1 February 2021 when the military overthrew the democratic government in a coup. On 14 March, the military declared martial law in selected regions of two largest cities (Yangon and Mandalay) and furthermore announced the introduction of a suite of new laws and penalties for insurrection and protest, including capital punishment. On 9 April 2021, state broadcaster Myawaddy TV announced that 23 protesters had been charged with murder, and pursuant to s496 of the criminal code, would face execution. The date of the execution was not announced, and it currently (as of 10 April) is unknown whether or how the sentences will be carried out. At least 17 of the convicted were tried in absentia and it is unclear how many have since been apprehended. While this would put Myanmar in the "retentionist" category, the legitimacy of the military government and the recently imposed martial laws are contested by the deposed government (known as the NUG) who claim sole legislative authority. The international community thus far have not decided whether the military junta or NUG is the legitimate government, and as such it is not clear whether these executions carried out by the military would be seen by the international community as lawful applications of the death penalty, or extrajudicial killings carried out by armed forces. Amnesty International now (2022) recognises Myanmar's retentionist status, but notes that "Following Myanmar military's issuance of Martial Law Order 3/2021, the authority to try civilians was transferred to special or existing military tribunals where individuals are tried through summary proceedings without right to appeal. These courts oversee a wide range of offences including those punishable with the death penalty. Under international law and standards, executions carried out following unfair trials violate the prohibition against arbitrary deprivation of life, as well as the absolute prohibition of torture and other cruel, inhuman or degrading punishment." As of 3 June 2022, it was reported that a total of 113 people had been sentenced to death by the junta for their roles in the counter-military revolution. On the same date, the junta confirmed the death warrants of four of the prisoners Hla Myo Aung, Ko Aung Thura Zaw, the long-time democratic activist Ko Jimmy, and the rapper and former NLD lawmaker Ko Phyo Zeya Thaw. With the confirmation of the death warrant, responsibility to determine whether, how, and when to proceed to executions fell to the Prison Department. It was announced by the junta that the executions were carried out on 23 July 2022. As the military junta is not recognized by the UN, the seats at the UN seats continue to be filled by diplomats of the deposed government and because of this Myanmar for the first time voted in favour of abolition in the 2022 UN resolution on abolishing the death penalty. Khit Thit Media reported via their Facebook page that the military handed down a further eleven death sentences on 30 November. In addition, executions are carried out within the de facto autonomous Wa State. Wa state (officially the Wa Self-Administered Division) is nominally a semi-autonomous division located in two disconnected regions within Shan State. As such it is in principle subject to the laws, enforcement, and judicial system of Myanmar. However, in reality, the Wa State is controlled entirely by the United Wa State Army (UWSA) - an ethnic armed organisation (EAO) previously in open rebellion against the Burmese government and military. While in recent years the UWSA has reached a détente with the Burmese central authority, the Burmese legal system does not apply in practice within Wa State. To wit, death sentences are handed down and carried out regularly, most recently in 2020. Wa State imposes the death penalty only for murder and executions are carried out by gunshot to the back of the head. An other de facto autonomous region, Mong La (officially: Shan State Special region 4) on the Myanmar-China border under the control of the National Democratic Alliance Army (NDAA) is also reputed to carry out executions much like Wa State.
A	Cambodia	1989		1989	Main article: Capital punishment in Cambodia Abolished in 1989 by the constitution.
P	China	2026	1000+	N/A	Main article: Capital punishment in China Lethal injection; firing squad. On 25 February 2011, China's newly revised Criminal Law reduced the number of crimes punishable by death by 13, from 68 to 55. Capital punishment for severe cases of embezzlement; rape; severe cases of fraud; bombing; flooding; rioting under aggravating circumstances; treason; political dissidence; subversion; terrorism; spreading poisons/hazardous substances; human trafficking; forcing prostitution; piracy; theft; drug trafficking; corruption; arson; aggravated assault; producing or selling tainted food or fake medicine resulting in death or serious medical injury; participating in an armed prison riot or jailbreak; murder; burglary; kidnapping; robbery; armed robbery; espionage; poaching; military offences (like insubordination, cowardice); sabotage; weapons trafficking; illegally manufacturing, selling, transporting or storing hazardous materials; endangerment of national security. Even the Chinese elite is not exempt, as billionaire Liu Han was executed 9 February 2015. Both Hong Kong and Macau have fully abolished capital punishment. In Hong Kong, it was last used in 1966 and abolished in 1993 by its British colonial government. In Macau, it was last used in the 1800s and abolished in 1976 by its Portuguese colonial government.
A	Cyprus	1962		2002	Main article: Capital punishment in Cyprus Abolished in 2002.
A	Timor-Leste	*None since independence in 2002		2002	Main article: Capital punishment in East Timor Capital punishment was suspended following UN administration in 1999 when a province of Indonesia. Abolished by the constitution in 2002.
A	Georgia	1995		2006	Main article: Capital punishment in Georgia (country) Capital punishment was abolished for most offenses in 1997, but the constitution stated that the Supreme Court had the power to impose capital punishment in exceptionally serious cases of "crimes against life". On 27 December 2006, President Mikheil Saakashvili signed into a law a new constitutional amendment fully abolishing capital punishment.
P	India	2020		N/A	Main article: Capital punishment in India Hanging and shooting. Capital punishment for murder; abetting suicide; treason; terrorism; drug trafficking; aircraft hijacking; aggravated robbery; espionage; kidnapping; conspiracy of a capital offence; attempted murder; capital perjury; aggravated rape; mutiny; some military offences. Military offences may be punished with a firing squad.
P	Indonesia	2016		N/A	Main article: Capital punishment in Indonesia Firing squad. Capital punishment for murder; treason; espionage; corruption; aggravated robbery; aggravated extortion; terrorism; some military offences; crimes against humanity; drug trafficking; producing chemical weapons. President Joko Widodo issued an informal moratorium on executions in 2018 due to outrage over the 2015 and 2016 executions, but there are no current plans for abolition 8 people including overseas nationals executed on 29 April 2015.
P	Iran	2026	972+	N/A	Main article: Capital punishment in Iran Hanging; shooting. Iran performs public executions. Iran is second only to China in the number of executions it carries out, executing hundreds every year. Capital punishment for murder; armed robbery; drug trafficking; kidnapping; zina; burglary; treason; political dissidence; sabotage; arson; espionage; terrorism; some military offences; apostasy; blasphemy; counterfeiting; smuggling; recidivist theft; extortion; alcohol consumption; capital perjury; "enmity against God". Secret executions are widespread in the country, so that exact numbers for each year are difficult to obtain and different figures are provided by various organisations.
P	Iraq	2026	63+	N/A	Main article: Capital punishment in Iraq Hanging. Capital punishment for murder; treason; terrorism; drug trafficking; rape; incest; espionage; treason; robbery; theft; burglary; kidnapping; arson; rioting; crimes against humanity. Suspended in June 2003 after 2003 invasion; reinstated August 2004. A total of 447 people were executed between then and the end of March 2013, with 129 in 2012 alone. The Kurdistan Region is abolitionist in practice for all ordinary crimes (remains retentionist for crimes in exceptional cases) since a moratorium has been in place since when Kurdistan president Masoud Barzani issued it in 2007.
P	Israel	1962		N/A Military; Abolished 1954 Civilian but reintroduced 2026.	Main article: Capital punishment in Israel Hanging; firing squad. Capital punishment for crimes against humanity and treason. Only two executions since independence in 1948: falsely accused traitor Meir Tobiansky (1948; posthumously acquitted) and Holocaust architect Adolf Eichmann (1962). Abolished for civilian crimes in 1954 but reintroduced in 2026 as a mandatory sentence for the crime of West Bank Palestinians causing the death by terrorism of Jews, with separate legislative efforts to get capital punishment backdated to 2023. Sentences are to be carried out within 90 days of conviction and without the ability of appeal.
P	Japan	2026	1	N/A	Main article: Capital punishment in Japan Hanging. Capital punishment for murder; treason. There are seven detention centres where execution is carried out - Tokyo, Osaka, Nagoya, Sendai, Fukuoka, Hiroshima and Sapporo. Between 1946 and 2003, 766 people were sentenced to death, 608 of whom were executed. For 40 months from 1989 to 1993 successive ministers of justice refused to authorise executions, which amounted to an informal moratorium. No execution in 2020 (first time in nine years).
P	Jordan	2026	8	N/A	Main article: Capital punishment in Jordan Hanging, shooting. Capital punishment for some cases of terrorism; murder; rape; aggravated robbery; drug trafficking; illegal possession and use of weapons; war crimes; espionage; treason. Executions resumed in 2014 after a hiatus.
A	Kazakhstan	2003		2021	Main article: Capital punishment in Kazakhstan Signed the Second Optional Protocol to the International Covenant on Civil and Political Rights in 2020. Abolished in 2021.
P	Kuwait	2025	6	N/A	Main article: Capital punishment in Kuwait Hanging. Capital punishment for drug trafficking; rape; murder; kidnapping; piracy; torture; human trafficking; terrorism; some military offences; treason; espionage; capital perjury.
A	Kyrgyzstan	*None since independence in 1991		2007	Main article: Capital punishment in Kyrgyzstan Kyrgyz authorities had extended a moratorium on executions from 1998 to abolition. Abolished by the constitution in 2007.
L	Laos	1989		N/A	Main article: Capital punishment in Laos Capital punishment for murder; kidnapping; terrorism; drug trafficking; treason; espionage.
A	Lebanon	2004		2026	Main article: Capital punishment in Lebanon Abolished in August 2026 by the Lebanese Parliament.
P	Malaysia	2017		N/A	Main article: Capital punishment in Malaysia Hanging. Capital punishment for drug trafficking; murder; terrorism; capital perjury; treason; some military crimes. A plan to fully abolish the death penalty was announced on 10 October 2018, but was later scaled down to only abolish mandatory death penalty on 13 March 2019. In July 2023, the Abolition of Mandatory Death Penalty Act came officially into force. A moratorium on executions remains.
L	Maldives	*None since independence in 1965 (1953, before independence)		N/A	Main article: Capital punishment in the Maldives Last execution when a colony of Britain was in 1953. Capital punishment for murder; terrorism; treason; adultery; apostasy. 60-year moratorium lifted in 2014.
A	Mongolia	2008		2012	Main article: Capital punishment in Mongolia President Tsakhiagiin Elbegdorj instituted a moratorium in 2010, systematically commuting all death sentences. On 5 January 2012, "a large majority of MPs" adopted a bill that aims to abolish the death penalty. After two years under the official moratorium, the State Great Khural formally signed the Second Optional Protocol to the International Covenant on Civil and Political Rights. This makes Mongolia abolitionist because under Article 1, paragraphs 1 and 2, of the Covenant, "No one within the jurisdiction of a State Party to the present Protocol shall be executed," and "Each State Party shall take all necessary measures to abolish the death penalty within its jurisdiction." Unlike in countries that retain capital punishment officially but have abolished it in practice, this made Mongolia abolitionist in both law and practice. However some dead laws that were still symbolically binding referenced capital punishment. These non-binding laws were removed from statutes by a 2015 Act, which took effect on 1 July 2016, making some people claim 2015 or 2016 as the year of de facto abolition. Mongolia is one of the last Eastern Bloc states (not including Eastern Europe) to abolish the death penalty. Death penalty was formally abolished on 1 July 2017.
A	Nepal	1979		1997	Main article: Capital punishment in Nepal The death penalty was abolished in 1946 for crimes under the country's common law, remaining in force only for acts of high treason against the state, such as assaulting the king or the royal family, and conspiring with a foreign state to undermine Nepal's independence. After being briefly reinstated between 1985 and 1990 for cases of murder and terrorism, it has been completely abolished since 1997 by the Constitution.
P	North Korea	2025	980+	N/A	Main article: Capital punishment in North Korea Firing squad. Most recent executions have been private, but some are public. Capital punishment for drug trafficking; treason; circulating "harmful" information; political dissidence; terrorism; espionage; murder; viewing international websites and media; listening to international radio broadcasts; kidnapping; rape; assault; burglary; insubordination; armed robbery; violation of Juche customs; human trafficking; defection; grand theft; making illegal international calls without a phone card; producing and/or watching pornography; embezzlement; counterfeiting; black market trafficking; damaging or destroying state property; taking unauthorised photographs of state property; unauthorised religious activity; prostitution. There have been at least 64 carried out death sentences in 2016, and in 2017 five North Korean minister-level officials were executed; it is not known whether these officials were executed due to a judicial sentence or a direct order of Kim Jong-un. No official numbers are known because of the secrecy surrounding capital punishment within the state.
P	Oman	2024	3	N/A	Main article: Capital punishment in Oman Firing squad. Capital punishment for treason; terrorism; espionage; murder; drug trafficking; arson; piracy; kidnapping; recidivism of life crimes; capital perjury.
P	Pakistan	2019		N/A	Main article: Capital punishment in Pakistan Hanging. Capital punishment for treason; terrorism; espionage; murder; drug trafficking; arms trafficking; some military offences; kidnapping; rape; capital perjury; adultery; blasphemy. Six-year moratorium lifted in 2014 after the Peshawar school massacre.
P	Palestine	2005		N/A	Hanging; firing squad. Capital punishment for treason; terrorism; espionage; murder; some military offences. The State of Palestine has ratified the Second Optional Protocol to the International Covenant on Civil and Political Rights.
A	Philippines	2000		2006	Main article: Capital punishment in the Philippines Abolished in 1987 under the present Constitution, re-introduced in 1993, re-abolished on 24 June 2006 under Republic Act No. 9346.
P	Qatar	2020		N/A	Main article: Capital punishment in Qatar Execution by firing squad. Capital punishment for espionage; threat to national security; apostasy (no recorded executions); homosexuality; blasphemy; murder; aggravated murder; violent robbery; arson; torture; kidnapping; terrorism; rape; drug trafficking; extortion by threat of accusation of a crime of honor; perjury causing wrongful execution and treason.
P	Saudi Arabia	2025	345+	N/A	Main article: Capital punishment in Saudi Arabia Decapitation, firing squad, stoning. Saudi Arabia performs public executions. Current Islamic laws allow the use of capital punishment for many violent and nonviolent offenses which includes aggravated burglary, treason, espionage, as well as homosexuality, adultery; murder; blasphemy; apostasy; drug trafficking; rape; armed robbery; some military offences; witchcraft; sexual misconduct and terrorism. Method most often used is beheading with a scimitar, although the firing squad is sometimes used. Bodies may be put on public display.
P	Singapore	2025	9	N/A	Main article: Capital punishment in Singapore Hanging. Capital punishment for terrorism; murder; treason; capital perjury; kidnapping; some firearm offences; genocide; arms trafficking; piracy; attempted murder by a convict under a life sentence; drug trafficking; some military offences.
L	South Korea	1997		N/A	Main article: Capital punishment in South Korea Hanging; firing squad. Capital punishment for aggravated murder; piracy; terrorism; treason; drug trafficking; recidivist robbery. There has been an unofficial moratorium on executions since President Kim Dae-jung took office in February 1998.
L	Sri Lanka	1976		N/A	Main article: Capital punishment in Sri Lanka Capital punishment for murder; treason; capital perjury; rape; armed robbery; drug trafficking; some firearm offences; some military offences. Moratorium since 1976.
P	Syria	2024	+	N/A	Main article: Capital punishment in Syria Hanging; shooting. Syria performs public executions. Capital punishment for treason; terrorism; espionage; murder; attempting a capital crime; recidivism of a life crime; capital perjury; drug trafficking; robbery; rape. Extrajudicial killings are commonplace in Syria. Persons excused from death row are women with small children, pregnant women, the mentally ill, the intellectually disabled, and teenagers who committed the crime under the age of 18 at the time. Since the start of the civil war, it cannot be known clearly how many people have been put on death row. In 2014, Syria had an execution rate of 1 in 3 000 000.
P	Taiwan	2025	2	N/A	Main article: Capital punishment in Taiwan Shooting; lethal injection. Capital punishment for treason (articles 14, 15, 17, 18, 24, 103, 104, 105, and 107), espionage (articles 19 and 20), malfeasance (articles 26 and 27), some military crimes (articles 31, 41, 42, 47, 48, 49, 50), hijacking (article 53), destroying military supplies and equipment (article 58), stealing and selling ammunition (article 65), fabricating orders (article 66), civil disturbance as a ringleader (article 101), abandoning territory (article 120), hijacking (articles 185–1 and 185–2), aggravated drug trafficking (Article 261), murder (articles 226–1, 271, 272, 272-1, and 286), aggravated robbery (articles 328 and 332), piracy (articles 333 and 334), aggravated kidnapping (articles 347 and 348). Those excluded from capital punishment are the elderly, pregnant women, women with small children, mentally ill people, and those under the age of 18 at the time of the crime.
L	Tajikistan	2004		N/A	Main article: Capital punishment in Tajikistan Firing squad. Capital punishment for aggravated murder, aggravated rape, terrorism, biocide, genocide. Moratorium introduced 30 April 2004 by President Emomali Rahmon. Persons excluded from death row are: the elderly, women, pregnant women, intellectually disabled, the mentally ill, and teenagers who were under the age of 18 at the time of the crime.
P	Thailand	2018		N/A	Main article: Capital punishment in Thailand Lethal injection. Capital punishment for 35 crimes including treason; murder; terrorism; espionage; murder; bribery; arson; rape; drug trafficking; kidnapping; certain military offences; illegal use of firearms or explosives. For a full list see here (PDF)
A	Turkey	1984		2004	Main article: Capital punishment in Turkey Abolished in 2004 by the Constitution.
A	Turkmenistan	1997		1999	Main article: Capital punishment in Turkmenistan Abolished 1999 by Constitution.
P	United Arab Emirates	2025	1+	N/A	Main article: Capital punishment in the United Arab Emirates Firing squad. Capital punishment for murder; drug trafficking; abetting the suicide of a mentally ill person; disposal of nuclear waste in the environment; aggravated rape; treason; apostasy; aggravated robbery; terrorism; espionage; capital perjury.
A	Uzbekistan	2005		2008	Main article: Capital punishment in Uzbekistan President Islam Karimov signed a decree on 1 August 2005 that replaced the death penalty with life imprisonment on 1 January 2008
P	Vietnam	2024	100+	N/A	Main article: Capital punishment in Vietnam Lethal injection. Capital punishment for treason (articles 108, 109, 112), espionage (article 110), terrorism (articles 113 and 299), sabotage (article 114), murder (article 123), aggravated child rape (article 142), aggravated drug trafficking (article 248), crimes against humanity (article 422), and war crimes (articles 421, 423).
P	Yemen	2025	38+	N/A	Main article: Capital punishment in Yemen Shooting, stoning. Yemen performs public executions. Capital punishment for murder; adultery; homosexuality; apostasy (no recorded executions); blasphemy; drug trafficking; capital perjury; kidnapping; zina; aggravated robbery; certain military offences; espionage; treason.

=== Europe ===
There are 43 United Nations member states in Europe, and 1 observer state. Of these:

- 1 (2.27 %) retain capital punishment in law and practice.
- 1 (2.27 %) retained capital punishment in law but have not used it in the last ten years and are believed to have a policy of not carrying out executions or have made a commitment not to do so.
- 42 (95.45 %) have fully abolished capital punishment.

Executions in Europe in the last five years: 2022 (1), 2023 (0), 2024 (0), 2025 (0), 2026 (0). These figures do not include Kosovo which is fully abolitionistic but is not a UN member state.

The abolition of capital punishment is a pre-condition for European Union membership, which considers capital punishment a "cruel and inhuman" practice and "has not been shown in any way to act as a deterrent to crime". Since 1997, Belarus has been the only UN member state in Europe to carry out executions. 2009, 2015, 2020, 2021, 2023, 2024, and 2025 are the first six years in recorded history during which Europe has been completely free of executions. The countries in Europe that most recently abolished capital punishment are Latvia (2012), Albania (2007), and Moldova (2005).

P: Retained in law and practice
L: Retained in law but have not used it in the last ten years and are believed to have a policy of not carrying out executions or have made a commitment not to do so.
E: Retain capital punishment only for exceptional crimes such as crimes under military law or crimes committed in exceptional circumstances
A: Fully abolished

Key	Country	Last execution	Executions in 2024	Year abolished	Notes
A	Albania	1995		2007	Main article: Capital punishment in Albania Abolished in 2007.
A	Andorra	1943		1990	Main article: Capital punishment in Andorra Abolished in 1990 by the Constitution.
A	Austria	1950		1968	Main article: Capital punishment in Austria Abolished in 1968 by the Constitution.
P	Belarus	2024		N/A	Main article: Capital punishment in Belarus Shooting. Capital punishment for treason; terrorism; aggravated murder; crimes against humanity; sabotage.
A	Belgium	1950		1996	Main article: Capital punishment in Belgium Abolished in 1996 by the Penal Code.
A	Bosnia and Herzegovina	*None since independence in 1991 (1977, before independence)		1998	Main article: Capital punishment in Bosnia and Herzegovina Abolished in 1998 by the Constitution.
A	Bulgaria	1989		1998	Main article: Capital punishment in Bulgaria Abolished in 1998.
A	Croatia	*None since independence in 1991 (1987, before independence)		1991	Main article: Capital punishment in Croatia Abolished in December 1990 by the Constitution, Art 21.1.
A	Czech Republic	*None since independence in 1993 (1989, before independence)		1990	Main article: Capital punishment in the Czech Republic Abolished in 1990 by the Constitution.
A	Denmark	1950		1978	Main article: Capital punishment in Denmark Last execution for common law crimes 1892. Last execution for war crimes 1950. Capital punishment was retroactively carried out 1945–50 for crimes related to the German occupation in World War II, repealed in 1951 and confirmed in 1993. A similar rule was active 1952–1978 in the civil penalty law for war crimes committed under extreme circumstances.
A	Estonia	1991		1998	Main article: Capital punishment in Estonia The last execution in Estonia has taken place on 11 September 1991 when Rein Oruste was shot with a bullet to the back of the head for the crime of murder.
A	Finland	1944		1972	Main article: Capital punishment in Finland Last peacetime execution 1825. Last wartime execution happened in 1944. Capital punishment was abolished for civilian crimes in 1949 (all existing sentences commuted to life imprisonment) and for all crimes 1972. In 1984 the death penalty was explicitly outlawed in the Finnish Constitution.
A	France	1977		1981	Main article: Capital punishment in France The death penalty was initially abolished by the Directory in 1795, but re-introduced by Napoleon in 1810. It was re-abolished in law in 1981 and by the Constitution in 2007.
A	Germany	1981		1987	Main article: Capital punishment in Germany Abolished by the Basic Law since the formation of the Federal Republic of Germany in 1949. However, US military authorities carried out seven executions on German territory in 1951, since they were, as an occupation force, not subjected to this. German Democratic Republic (country which ceased to exist in 1990 and all of its territory joined the Federal Republic of Germany) abolished the death penalty in 1987, the last execution was held in 1981.
A	Greece	1972		2004	Main article: Capital punishment in Greece Abolished completely with the Constitutional Amendment of 2001 and then with the approval by Greek Parliament of the ratification of protocol 13 of the ECHR in 12/2004.
A	Hungary	1988		1990	Main article: Capital punishment in Hungary Capital punishment was abolished in 1990 and the last execution was of Ernő Vadász on 14 July 1988 for murder.
A	Iceland	*None since independence in 1944 (1830, before independence)		1928	Main article: Capital punishment in Iceland Last execution in 1830 when a colony of Denmark. Abolished in 1928; reintroduction made unconstitutional in 1995 by unanimous vote of Parliament.
A	Ireland	1954		1990	Main article: Capital punishment in Ireland Abolished for murder in 1964, and for remaining offences in 1990. Last death sentences passed in 1985; all since 1954 commuted to imprisonment.
A	Italy	1947		1994	Main article: Capital punishment in Italy On 30 November 1786 the Grand Duchy of Tuscany (then independent, now a part of Italy) became the first state in the modern era to completely abolish the death penalty. However, it was later repeatedly reintroduced and re-abolished, until its definitive ban in 1859. From 1815 to 1859 only two people were executed by the grand ducal authorities. For a brief period between 1847 and 1848, upon its reversion to Tuscany, the Duchy of Lucca became the only Italian territory in which the abolition was in force. The short lived Roman Republic of Feb–July 1849 abolished the death penalty before being overthrown by French troops. When the Kingdom of Italy was formed in 1861, capital punishment remained in force in all the constituent states except Tuscany until it was abolished nationwide in 1889 – although it was maintained under military and colonial law. In 1926 Mussolini reintroduced the death penalty into Italian law. A total of 26 people (9 civilians and 16 soldiers) were executed during the Fascist regime, none from political reasons. It was re-abolished from the penal code in 1944. Art. 27 of the Constitution of the Italian Republic (1948) completely abolished it for all common military and civilian crimes during peacetime. The death penalty was still, formally, in force in Italy in the military penal code, only for high treachery against the Republic or only in war theatre perpetrated crimes (though no execution ever took place) until it was abolished completely from there as well, in 1994. Article 27 of Italian Constitution was eventually amended in 2007 to prohibit the reintroduction of death penalty in time of war too.
A	Kosovo	*None since self-proclaimed independence in 2008 (1987, as part of Yugoslavia)		2008	The partially recognised Republic of Kosovo does not have the death penalty.
A	Latvia	1996		2012	Main article: Capital punishment in Latvia Abolished for civilian offences in 1999. Abolished for all crimes in 2012.
A	Liechtenstein	1785		1989	Main article: Capital punishment in Liechtenstein
A	Lithuania	1995		1998	Main article: Capital punishment in Lithuania
A	Luxembourg	1949		1979	Main article: Capital punishment in Luxembourg Abolished by the Constitution in 1979.
A	Malta	*None since independence in 1964 (1943, before independence)		2000	Main article: Capital punishment in Malta Last execution when a colony of Britain was in 1943. Capital punishment for murder abolished in 1971; part of the military code until 2000.
A	Moldova	*None since independence in 1991		2005	Main article: Capital punishment in Moldova No executions since independence from USSR in 1991. On 23 September 2005 the Moldovan Constitutional Court approved constitutional amendments that abolished the death penalty. The self-proclaimed state of Transnistria, which is claimed by Moldova, still retains the death penalty but has observed a moratorium on executions since 1999.
A	Monaco	1847		1962	Main article: Capital punishment in Monaco Abolished in 1962 by the Constitution.
A	Montenegro	*None since independence in 2006 (1981, before independence)		1995	Main article: Capital punishment in Montenegro Last execution when a part of Yugoslavia was on 29 January 1981. Capital punishment abolished by the Federal Republic of Yugoslavia in 1995. When Montenegro declared independence in 2006 it became an abolitionist state.
A	Netherlands	1952		1982 (Netherlands); 2010 (Antilles)	Main article: Capital punishment in the Netherlands See also: Capital punishment in Aruba Last execution for peacetime offences in 1860. Abolished for peacetime offences in 1870. Abolished in Netherlands by Constitution 1982. Last Netherlands overseas territory to abolish was Antilles in 2010.
A	North Macedonia	*None since independence in 1991 (1988, before independence)		1991	Main article: Capital punishment in Macedonia Last execution when it was part of Yugoslavia in 1988. Abolished in 1991 by the Constitution.
A	Norway	1948		1979	Main article: Capital punishment in Norway Abolished for peacetime offences in 1902, last execution for peacetime offences 1876. Last executions of wartime offenders conducted on 37 men convicted of treason or war crimes in WWII in 1945–48.
A	Poland	1988		1998	Main article: Capital punishment in Poland A criminal law reform including reintroduction of death penalty was proposed in 2004 by Prawo i Sprawiedliwość, but lost its first reading vote in the Sejm by 198 to 194 with 14 abstentions. It is said that this was only populism, since Poland had joined the European Union so there was no chance.
A	Portugal	1917		1867 Civilian crimes. 1976 All crimes.	Main article: Capital punishment in Portugal Capital Punishment was abolished for political crimes in 1852, civilian crimes in 1867 and war crimes in 1911. In 1916, capital punishment was reinstated only for military offenses that occurred in a war against a foreign country and in the theater of war. Capital punishment was completely abolished again in 1976.
A	Romania	1989		1990	Main article: Capital punishment in Romania The last people to be convicted and executed in Romania were the dictator Nicolae Ceaușescu and his wife, Elena Ceaușescu, by firing squad during the Romanian Revolution of 1989. Their accusations ranged from crimes against humanity to high-treason. Abolished in 1990 and banned by the Constitution in 1991.
L	Russia	1996		N/A	Main article: Capital punishment in Russia Shooting. There have been four brief periods when Russia has completely abolished the death penalty, in the 18th century Russian empress Elizabeth abolished it, but it was restored by the next emperor, Peter III of Russia; then, from 12 March to 12 July 1917 following the overthrow of the Tsar, 27 October 1917 to 16 June 1918 following the seizure of power by the Bolsheviks, and in 1947–1950 after the end of the Second World War (Joseph Stalin abolished it in 1947, but he had restored it in 1950, and for this short period, the strictest punishment in USSR was penal servitude in gulag for 25 years). Currently the Criminal Code of the Russian Federation permits capital punishment for aggravated murder, attempted murder of a state official, and genocide. On 16 April 1997 Russia signed the Sixth Protocol to the European Convention on Human Rights, but has yet to ratify it. There has been a moratorium on executions since 1999 and none carried out since August 1996. In November 2009, the Constitutional Court extended the moratorium indefinitely pending ratification of the 6th protocol. Capital punishment is still present within the statutes.
A	San Marino	1468 or 1667		1865	Main article: Capital punishment in San Marino First abolished for civilian crimes in 1848, it was reintroduced in 1853 following the assassination of the Secretary of State. Abolished for all crimes again in 1865.
A	Serbia	*None since independence in 2006 (1992, before independence)		1995	Main article: Capital punishment in Serbia Last execution when a part of Yugoslavia was in 1992. Capital punishment abolished by the Federal Republic of Yugoslavia in 1995. When Serbia became independent in 2006 it became an abolitionist state.
A	Slovakia	*None since independence in 1993 (1989, before independence)		1990	Main article: Capital punishment in Slovakia Last execution when a part of Czechoslovakia was in 1989. Abolished 1990 by the Constitution when still a constituent part of Czechoslovakia. Upon independence on 1 January 1993 Slovakia became a new abolitionist state.
A	Slovenia	*None since independence in 1991 (1959, before independence)		1991	Main article: Capital punishment in Slovenia Last execution when a part of Yugoslavia was in 1959. Abolished in Slovenian Yugoslav Republic 1989 by the Constitution. Upon declaration of independence in 1991 Slovenia removed itself from the jurisdiction of the Federal Yugoslav capital punishment statutes effectively achieving complete abolition.
A	Spain	1975		1978 Civilian. 1995 Military.	Main article: Capital punishment in Spain Abolished in 1978 by the Constitution except for wartime offences. Removed from the military penal code in 1995.
A	Sweden	1910		1973	Main article: Capital punishment in Sweden Peacetime offences 1921, Wartime offences 1973. Constitutionally prohibited since 1975.
A	Switzerland	1944		1992	Main article: Capital punishment in Switzerland Capital punishment was abolished in 1874, but reinstated in 1879. It was practised by a few cantons (9 executions up to 1940). Abolished by popular vote in 1938, except for wartime military crimes, for which it was abolished in 1992. Prohibited by the 1999 Constitution.
A	Ukraine	1997		2000	Main article: Capital punishment in Ukraine Abolished February 2000 after the Constitutional Court ruled the death penalty unconstitutional in December 1999. New criminal code passed in April 2000. The unrecognized Donetsk People's Republic reintroduced the death penalty for treason in 2014.
A	United Kingdom	1977 (Bermuda); 1964 (UK)		1998	Main article: Capital punishment in the United Kingdom Last execution in the UK was in 1964. The last execution on British Overseas Territory occurred in Bermuda in 1977. Abolished for murder in 1969 in Great Britain and 1973 in Northern Ireland. Abolished for all remaining offences (treason, piracy with violence, and six military offences) in the UK in 1998. 13th protocol to the ECHR ratified in 2003 confirming total abolition. See also: Capital punishment in the British Indian Ocean Territory, Capital punishment in Gibraltar, Capital punishment in Guernsey, Capital punishment in the Isle of Man, and Capital punishment in Jersey The last British territory to completely abolish capital punishment was Jersey in 2006 (see Capital punishment in Jersey).
A	Vatican City	1870		1969	Main article: Capital punishment in Vatican City Last execution on 9 July 1870. Never used within the Vatican City itself and only carried out in the Papal States by local authorities where the sentences were handed out. From 1870 to 1929 the Vatican had no sovereign territories, and no death sentences were applied. Officially re-introduced in the Law Codes in 1927, only for papal murder. Abolished in 1969.

=== Oceania ===
There are 14 member states of the United Nations in Oceania. Of these:

- 1 (7.14 %) retains capital punishment in law but has not used it in the last ten years and are believed to have a policy of not carrying out executions or have made a commitment not to do so.
- 13 (92.86 %) have fully abolished capital punishment.

Only Tonga has not formally abolished capital punishment despite not using it since 1982. The countries in Oceania that most recently abolished the death penalty are Papua New Guinea (2022), Nauru (2016), and Fiji (2015).

P: Retained in law and practice
L: Retained in law but have not used it in the last ten years and are believed to have a policy of not carrying out executions or have made a commitment not to do so.
E: Retain capital punishment only for exceptional crimes such as crimes under military law or crimes committed in exceptional circumstances
A: Fully abolished

Key	Country	Last execution	Executions in 2024	Year abolished	Notes
A	Australia	1967		1985	Main article: Capital punishment in Australia Capital punishment was abolished in Queensland in 1922; Tasmania in 1968; the Northern Territory, the Australian Capital Territory and the Commonwealth in 1973; Victoria in 1975; South Australia in 1976; Western Australia in 1984; and New South Wales in 1985. On 11 March 2010, Federal Parliament passed laws that prevent the death penalty from being reintroduced by any state or territory in Australia.
A	Fiji	*None since independence in 1970 (1964, before independence)		2015	Main article: Capital punishment in Fiji Last execution when a colony of Britain was in 1964. The death penalty for crimes under the Republic of Fiji Military Forces Act was abolished in Feb 2015. Abolished for other crimes 1979.
A	Kiribati	*None since independence in 1979		1979	
A	Marshall Islands	*None since independence in 1986		1986	Abolished in 1986 by Constitution.
A	Federated States of Micronesia	*None since independence in 1986		1986	Abolished in 1986 by Constitution.
A	Nauru	*None since independence in 1968		2016	Main article: Capital punishment in Nauru Death penalty abolished May 2016. Despite having abolished capital punishment, Nauru voted against the UN Moratorium on the Death Penalty in 2018.
A	New Zealand	1957		1989	Main article: Capital punishment in New Zealand Abolished in New Zealand in 1941 for most crimes, reinstated in 1950, abolished again in 1961 for most crimes, and formally abolished for treason in 1989. Niue and the Cook Islands, New Zealand's associated states, formally abolished the death penalty in 1966 and 2007 respectively, although it had never been physically applied in their territories. See also: Capital punishment in the Cook Islands See also: Capital punishment in Niue
A	Palau	*None since independence in 1994		1994	
A	Papua New Guinea	*None since independence in 1975 (1957, before independence)		2022	Main article: Capital punishment in Papua New Guinea Last execution when under Australian administration in November 1957. The death penalty was abolished in 1970, five years before independence. It was reinstated in 1991, but never applied. It was abolished again in 2022.
A	Samoa	*None since independence in 1962 (1952, before independence)		2004	Main article: Capital punishment in Samoa Last execution under New Zealand colonial rule in April 1952. Since independence in 1962 all death sentences were commuted to life imprisonment. The death penalty was formally abolished in 2004.
A	Solomon Islands	*None since independence in 1978		1978	
L	Tonga	1982		N/A	Main article: Capital punishment in Tonga Hanging. Capital punishment for treason; murder.
A	Tuvalu	*None since independence in 1978		1978	
A	Vanuatu	*None since independence in 1980		1980	

== Abolition chronology ==
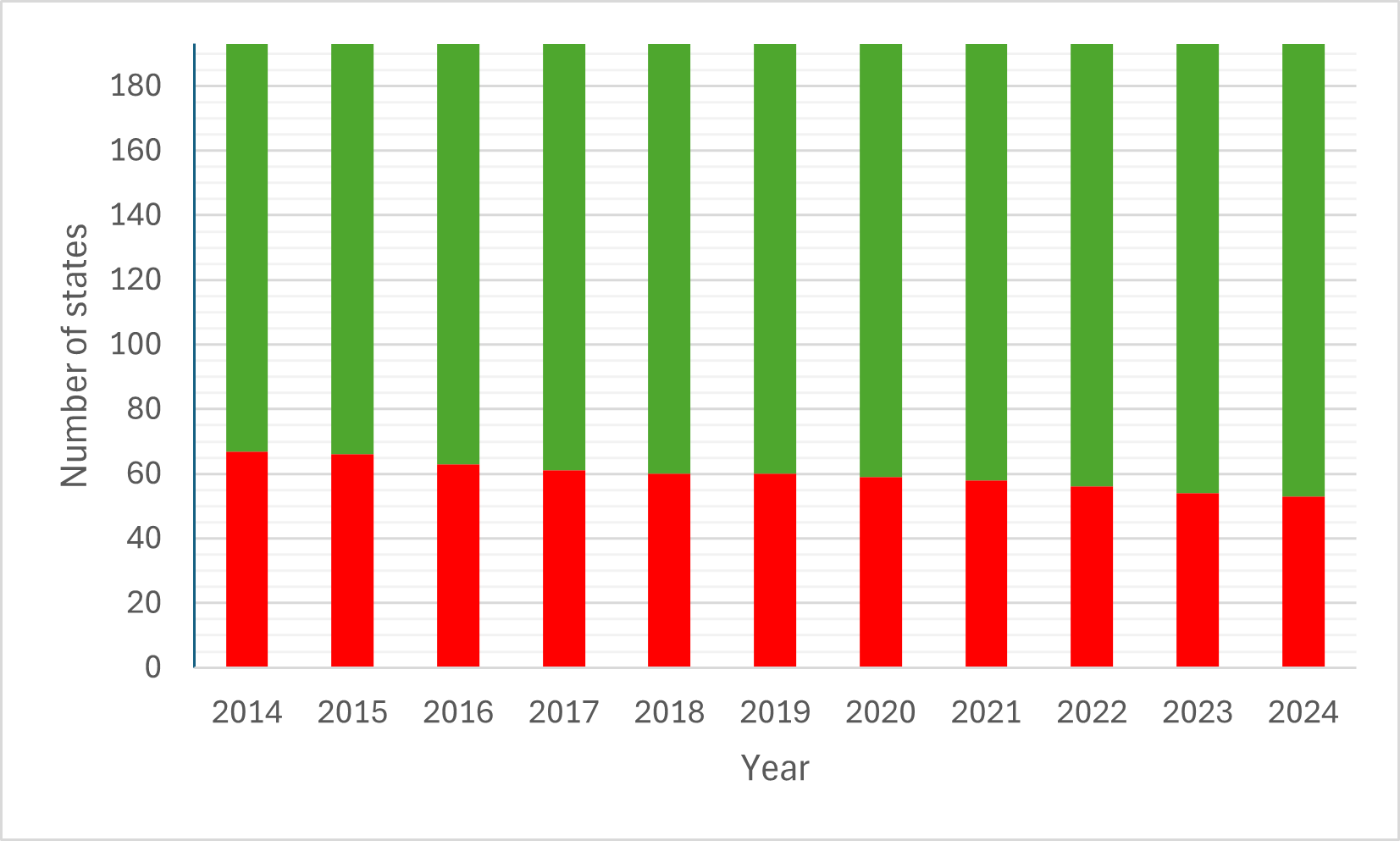
Abolition over time Abolitionist states Retentionist states

The table below lists in chronological order the 110 UN member or observer states that have completely abolished the death penalty as of 2025, with Lebanon joining in 2026. As mentioned above, Amnesty International also includes Kosovo, which has limited international recognition, and the Cook Islands and Niue, which are dependencies of New Zealand but have autonomy in this regard, bringing the total number of abolitionist countries in its reports to 114. In the century after the abolition of capital punishment by Venezuela in 1863, until 1959 only 9 more countries followed, not counting temporary abolitions that were later reversed. From the 1960s onwards, abolition accelerated: 4 countries abolished capital punishment in the 1960s (a record up to that time for any decade), 10 in the 1970s, and 11 in the 1980s. After the end of Cold War, many more countries followed: 37 countries abolished capital punishment in the 1990s, with 9 in 1990 alone, 22 in the 2000s, 10 in the 2010s, and 7 between 2020 and August 2026. Since 1985, there have been only 7 years when no country has abolished capital punishment: 2001, 2003, 2011, 2013, 2018, 2024, and 2025.

When a country has abolished, reinstated, and re-abolished (e.g. Philippines, Switzerland, Portugal, Italy) only the later abolition date is included. Countries which have abolished and since reinstated it and are yet to abolish it again (e.g. Liberia, Malawi) are excluded altogether. References are in the continental tables above and not repeated here. Federal countries such as the United States where it has not been abolished everywhere do not appear, even if some jurisdictions in that country have abolished capital punishment.

Year abolished	Country	Countries per year	Running total
1863	Venezuela	1	1
1865	San Marino	1	2
1877	Costa Rica	1	3
1903	Panama	1	4
1906	Ecuador	1	5
1907	Uruguay	1	6
1910	Colombia	1	7
1928	Iceland	1	8
1949	Germany	1	9
1956	Honduras	1	10
1962	Monaco	1	11
1966	Dominican Republic	1	12
1968	Austria	1	13
1969	Vatican City	1	14
1972	Finland	1	15
1973	Sweden	1	16
1976	Portugal	1	17
1978	Denmark Solomon Islands Tuvalu	3	20
1979	Kiribati Luxembourg Nicaragua Norway	4	24
1980	Vanuatu	1	25
1981	Cape Verde France	2	27
1982	Netherlands	1	28
1985	Australia	1	29
1986	Marshall Islands Federated States of Micronesia	2	31
1988	Haiti	1	32
1989	Cambodia Liechtenstein New Zealand	3	35
1990	Andorra (Czech Republic Slovakia as Czechoslovakia) Croatia Hungary Ireland Mozambique Namibia Romania São Tomé and Príncipe	9	44
1991	North Macedonia Slovenia	3	47
1992	Angola Paraguay Switzerland	3	50
1993	Guinea-Bissau Seychelles	2	52
1994	Italy Palau	2	54
1995	Djibouti Mauritius (Montenegro Serbia as Yugoslavia) South Africa Spain	6	60
1996	Belgium	1	61
1997	Nepal	1	62
1998	Armenia Azerbaijan Bosnia and Herzegovina Bulgaria Estonia Lithuania Poland United Kingdom	8	70
1999	Canada Turkmenistan	2	72
2000	Ivory Coast Malta Ukraine	3	75
2002	Cyprus Timor-Leste	2	77
2004	Bhutan Greece Samoa Senegal Turkey	5	82
2005	Mexico Moldova	2	84
2006	Georgia Philippines	2	86
2007	Albania Kyrgyzstan Rwanda	3	89
2008	Uzbekistan	1	90
2009	Argentina Bolivia Burundi Togo	4	94
2010	Gabon	1	95
2012	Latvia Mongolia	2	97
2014	Madagascar	1	98
2015	Congo Fiji Suriname	3	101
2016	Benin Nauru	2	103
2017	Guinea	1	104
2020	Chad	1	105
2021	Kazakhstan Sierra Leone	2	107
2022	Central African Republic Papua New Guinea	2	109
2023	Zambia	1	110
2026	Lebanon	1	111

== See also ==
- Outline of capital punishment
- American Convention on Human Rights
- Corporal punishment
- European Convention on Human Rights
- Life imprisonment
- List of countries by incarceration rate
- List of most recent executions by jurisdiction
- Second Optional Protocol to the International Covenant on Civil and Political Rights
