= Antigovernment =

Antigovernment may refer to:

- Opposition (politics), a party with views opposing the current government administration
- Political dissent, opposition to the politics of the governing body
- Sedition, incitement of discontent to a lawful governing body
- Anti-statism, a political philosophy opposing state interference
- Anti-authoritarianism – Opposition to authoritarianism
- Anarchism, a political philosophy advocating the abolition of rulers
- Insurrection, revolt or uprising by irregular forces
- Rebellion, violent resistance against government
