= Capital punishment in Tanzania =

Capital punishment is a legal penalty in Tanzania. Tanzania has two capital offences: treason and murder. The death penalty is the mandatory sentence for murder.

Despite the legality of capital punishment in Tanzania, no executions have been carried out since 1995. Tanzania is classified as "Abolitionist in Practice."

There are believed to have been new sentences handed down in Tanzania in 2021, though the number is unknown. There were believed to have been at least 480 people on death row in Tanzania at the end of 2021.

On 19 July 2019, the High Court of Tanzania ruled that "there is not enough evidence to challenge the death penalty."
