= Capital punishment in Algeria =

Capital punishment is a legal penalty in Algeria. Despite its legality, the last executions in the country were carried out in 1993, of seven unnamed Islamic terrorists. Due to a lack of executions in over ten years, Algeria is considered to be an abolitionist-in-practice.

Algeria's execution method is firing squad. Capital punishment legally remains for a variety of offences including treason, espionage, aggravated murder, counterfeiting, terrorism, torture, kidnapping, aggravated theft, some military offences, attempting a capital crime, some cases of recidivism, and capital perjury.

Algeria voted in favor of all eight UN moratorium on the death penalty resolutions, in 2007, 2008, 2010, 2012, 2014, 2016, 2018, and 2020. It has also been a co-sponsor since at least the 2012 resolution.
