= Capital punishment in Trinidad and Tobago =

Capital punishment is a legal penalty in Trinidad and Tobago. The method of execution is hanging. Its last execution was of Anthony Briggs for murder on 28 July 1999. However, the country is still considered "retentionist' due to lack of "an established practice or policy against carrying out executions." Trinidad and Tobago is the only country in the Americas that retains the mandatory death penalty for murder.

3 new death sentences were handed down in 2021. There were 45 people on death row in Trinidad and Tobago at the end of 2021.

On 16 May 2022, the Judicial Committee of the Privy Council declined to strike down the mandatory death penalty in Trinidad and Tobago.
