= Capital punishment in Bolivia =

Capital punishment has been abolished in Bolivia and is no longer a lawful punishment in the country. It was abolished for ordinary crimes in 1997, and for all crimes in 2009. Bolivia's last execution was of Melquiades Suxo on 30 August 1973.

Bolivia voted in favor of the United Nations moratorium on the death penalty eight consecutive times: in 2007, 2008, 2010, 2012, 2014, 2016, 2018, and 2020. Bolivia is a state party to the Second Optional Protocol to the International Covenant on Civil and Political Rights. It acceded to the treaty on 12 Jul 2013.
