= Capital punishment in Guinea =

Capital punishment was abolished in Guinea. The civilian death penalty was abolished in 2016. It was abolished under military law in 2017. Guinea carried out its last execution in 2001. Prior to its abolition for ordinary crimes in 2016, Guinea was classified as retentionist.

Guinea is not a state party to the Second Optional Protocol to the International Covenant on Civil and Political Rights.
