= Capital punishment in Guyana =

Related legislation
- Criminal Law (Offences) Act

Capital punishment is a legal penalty in Guyana. Despite its legality, no executions have been carried out since 1997. However, due to a lack of "an established practice or policy against carrying out executions," Guyana is classified as a "retentionist" state. Guyana is the only country in South America that retains capital punishment for ordinary crimes.

Guyana sentenced four people to death in 2021. As of 24 May 2021, there are 27 prisoners on death row in Guyana. Guyana abstained from voting regarding the 2020 United Nations moratorium on the death penalty.
