= Capital punishment in San Marino =

Capital punishment has not been applied in San Marino for centuries. It was provided for by the 1352–53 statutes, by decapitation in the case of treason, by hanging in the case of murder or arson: the last execution was carried out in 1468 or in 1677.

San Marino is one of only two countries in the world to have ceased carrying out executions prior to 1800 (the other is Liechtenstein, where the last execution took place in 1785).

San Marino formally abolished the death penalty for the first time in 1848, but 5 years later, in 1853, it was reintroduced following the assassination of the Secretary of State, Gian Battista Bonelli, until its definitive exclusion from the list of penalties, by virtue of article 142 of the 1865 criminal code. Thus, San Marino became the second country in the world (and the first in Europe) to abolish the death penalty for all crimes, following Venezuela in 1863. It is one of only three countries to have abolished the death penalty for all crimes before 1900 (the third one being Costa Rica).

In 1989, it formally ratified Protocol No. 6 to the European Convention on Human Rights, which requires the complete abolition of the death penalty in peacetime. On 3 May 2002, it signed Protocol No. 13 to the European Convention on Human Rights, which requires the complete abolition of the death penalty, including in times of war or imminent threat of war. On 25 April 2003, it ratified Protocol No. 13. San Marino is also a state party to the Second Optional Protocol to the International Covenant on Civil and Political Rights, which it signed on 26 September 2003 and ratified on 17 August 2004.

San Marino voted in favor of the United Nations moratorium on the death penalty in 2007, 2008, 2010, 2012, 2014, 2016, 2018, and most recently, in 2020.
