= Capital punishment in Brunei =

Capital punishment in Brunei Darussalam is a legal penalty, applicable to a number of violent and non-violent crimes in the Sultanate. Along with offences such as murder, terrorism, and treason, other crimes have become liable to the death penalty since the phased introduction of sharia from 2014. This includes homosexual activity since April 2019. Legal methods of execution in Brunei are hanging and, since 2014, stoning. The last execution in Brunei occurred in 1957, while it was still a British Protectorate.

== History ==
In April 2014, a new penal code, the Syariah Penal Code Order (SPCO) was introduced by Brunei to implement elements of sharia law. It instituted the death penalty (by stoning) for adultery, sodomy, rape, apostasy, blasphemy, and insulting Islam. There has been a de facto moratorium on the death penalty since the country gained independence in 1984. Despite plans to reimplement capital punishment by 2019 for offences under the SPCO, the moratorium was further extended to include the new code following widespread international condemnation of it. The moratorium is liable to be lifted at any time. In response to international criticism the Sultan of Brunei, Sultan Hassanal Bolkiah, declared that the death penalty for sodomy and adultery would not be enforced and personally extended the moratorium.

As of 2018, it was estimated that were about six individuals on death row in Brunei. Two of them are Filipino immigrant workers, though one had his death sentence commuted to life imprisonment. The last known death sentence was handed down in 2017, and one death sentence was commuted in 2009.

== See also ==
- Capital punishment for non-violent offenses
- Capital punishment by country
