= Capital punishment in Zambia =

Capital punishment was a legal penalty in Zambia until 2023. Despite its former legality, the country had not carried out any execution since 1997. Zambia was considered "Abolitionist in Practice".

There were at least 9 new death sentences in Zambia in 2021. 257 people were on death row at the end of 2021.

On 25 May 2022, Zambian President Hakainde Hichilema announced that the death penalty would soon be abolished in Zambia.

On 23 December 2022, capital punishment was officially abolished, though it remained in some military statutes. These statutes were amended to fully remove capital punishment from courts martial in the Defense (Amendment) Act signed into law on 22 December 2023.

On 19 December 2024, Zambia acceded to the Second Optional Protocol to the International Covenant on Civil and Political Rights.
