= Capital punishment in Togo =

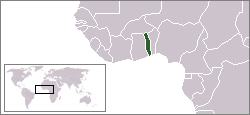
Location map for the Togo.

Capital punishment was abolished in Togo in 2009. The country carried out its last execution in 1978. Prior to the death penalty's de jure abolition, Togo was classified as "Abolitionist in Practice."

Togo acceded to the Second Optional Protocol to the International Covenant on Civil and Political Rights on 14 Sep 2016. Togo voted in favour of the 2020 United Nations moratorium on the death penalty resolution.
