= Capital punishment in Niger =

Capital punishment is a legal penalty in Niger. Despite its legality, the last known execution in the country was carried out in 1976 for treason. Niger is classified as "Abolitionist in Practice." There were no new death sentences recorded in 2021. There were 4 people on death row in Niger at the end of 2021.
