= Capital punishment in Eritrea =

Capital punishment is a legal penalty in Eritrea. However, Eritrea is considered "abolitionist in practice," as the nation's most recent official execution took place in 1989. No executions have taken place in Eritrea since they declared independence from Ethiopia and gained international recognition in 1993.

== Capital punishment law ==
The execution methods allowed under the law of the country are hanging and shooting.

The Eritrean Penal Code permits the death penalty as a punishment for a "Class 1 Serious Offence" or a "Class 2 Serious Offence." The death penalty is not mandatory; it is one of several punitive sentencing options for serious crimes. The Class 1 offences that can be punished with death in Eritrea include genocide; crimes against humanity; war crimes against the civilian population; war crimes against wounded, sick, or shipwrecked individuals; war crimes against prisoners of war; high treason; aggravated sabotage; piracy; and aggravated murder. The Class 2 offences that can be punished with death in Eritrea include treason during times of war or state emergencies; aggravated espionage; aggravated corruption of a public official for an amount exceeding five million Nakfas; "causing a catastrophe"; and aircraft hijacking.

Eritrea does not permit the execution of pregnant women, mothers of children under three years old, people designated "mentally or physically ill," and people who have not exhausted their appeals. Eritrea does not permit the execution of people who have been under a sentence of death for 30 or more years.

== Recent developments ==
Eritrea's last execution took place in 1989, four years before the nation declared independence from Ethiopia and gained international recognition. The New York Times reported in 1989 on the execution of General Demessie Bulto, who had attempted a coup against Ethiopian President Mengistu Haile Mariam, and was put to death by junior officers in Asmara on 19 May 1989. The Times did not report what method was used to carry out the execution.

As of May 2024, there is no one under sentence of death in Eritrea.

In 2010 and 2012, Eritrea signed the United Nations Moratorium Resolution's Note Verbale of Dissociation but did not serve as a cosponsor and abstained from voting on the resolution. In 2019, the Eritrean Delegation at the United Nations Human Rights Committee stated, "There was no consensus in the country on the abolition of the death penalty." The Human Rights Committee noted that there was no official moratorium on the death penalty in place in Eritrea; they recommended that the country implement an official moratorium and become signatories to the Second Optional Protocol to the International Covenant on Civil and Political Rights, which concerns global abolition of the death penalty. Eritrea voted in favor of the 2020 United Nations moratorium on the death penalty.

The Constitution of Eritrea, which was ratified in on 23 May 1997, permits the death penalty, as it states, "[no] person shall be deprived of life without due process of law." However, as of 31 December 2022, there were no inmates under a death sentence in Eritrea. Between 31 December 2022 and 6 May 2024, Eritrea did not sentence any inmates to death or carry out any executions.
