= Capital punishment in Mali =

Capital punishment is a legal penalty in Mali. Despite its legality, Mali has not executed anyone since 1980. Mali is considered "Abolitionist in Practice."

Courts handed down at least 48 recorded death sentences in Mali in 2021. There were at least 48 people on death row at the end of 2021.
