= Capital punishment in Cambodia =

Location of Cambodia on the map

Capital punishment in Cambodia is prohibited by the Constitution of the country. Cambodia abolished the death penalty in 1989. Cambodia is one of only two ASEAN countries (the other being the Philippines) to have abolished capital punishment.

== Legislation ==
The Constitution of the Kingdom of Cambodia (1993) at Art. 32 states:

All people have the right to life, freedom and personal security. There shall be no capital punishment.

== Politics ==
Following the end of the Khmer Rouge communist regime in Democratic Kampuchea, whereby capital punishment was regularly used against political opponents, in 1989, the People's Republic of Kampuchea (later renamed Cambodia) introduced a new constitution that abolished capital punishment as a sentencing option. This abolition of the death penalty was reaffirmed in the 1993 constitution that restored the Kingdom of Cambodia. In 1995, First Prime Minister Prince Norodom Ranariddh made calls for capital punishment by calling for murderers and drug traffickers to be executed by the State.

In 2019, Prime Minister Hun Sen said that he was considering introducing capital punishment for people who rape children, but he said it would only happen after a nationwide referendum. A couple days after this announcement, Hun Sen shifted his stance. In 2026, the Minister of Justice, Kouet Rith formally notified the World Congress Against The Death Penalty that Cambodia had ratified the Second Optional Protocol to the International Covenant on Civil and Political Rights. As a result, this meant Cambodia made a declaration that they would not reintroduce the death penalty.

== See also ==
- Capital punishment by country
- Killing Fields
