= Capital punishment in Grenada =

Capital punishment is a legal penalty in Grenada. Despite its legality, there have been no executions since 1978. Grenada is considered "abolitionist in practice", and is currently the only country in the Americas in this category. There is currently one person on death row in Grenada, as of August 30, 2021. During its United Nations Universal Periodic Review on January 27, 2020, Grenada informed the UN that it was a de facto abolitionist state with a de facto moratorium in effect since 1978, and that it would not carry out any executions. Abolishing capital punishment in law was part of one of the amendments during the failed 2016 Grenadian constitutional referendum. Grenada voted against the United Nations moratorium on the death penalty in 2007, 2008, 2010, 2012, 2014, 2016, 2018, and most recently, in 2020. Grenada is not a signatory to the Second Optional Protocol to the International Covenant on Civil and Political Rights.

Notable examples of people sentenced to death (but not executed) in Grenada's history include Hudson Austin and Bernard Coard.
