= Capital punishment in the Central African Republic =

The Central African Republic has abolished capital punishment, after the National Assembly passed a bill abolishing it on 27 May 2022. Prior to its abolition in law, the nation was considered "Abolitionist in Practice." The country carried out its last executions, of six unnamed men, in January 1981.

In 2018, Roland Achille Bangue-Betangai, the Chairman of the Legislation Committee of the Parliament of the Central African Republic, introduced a bill to abolish the death penalty in the country. In March the following year, the Speaker of the National Assembly, Laurent Ngon-Baba, created a joint committee to examine the bill.
