= Capital punishment in Mauritius =

Capital punishment was abolished in Mauritius in 1995, following the adoption of the Abolition of Death Penalty Act 1995 (No. 31 of 1995). The last execution was carried out in Mauritius in 1987.

Mauritius is not a state party to the Second Optional Protocol to the International Covenant on Civil and Political Rights. It voted in favour of the 2020 UN moratorium on the death penalty.
