= Capital punishment in Jamaica =

Capital punishment in Jamaica is a legal penalty. Currently, the only crime punishable by death is aggravated murder. The method of execution is hanging. Jamaica was originally a British colony. The last person executed in Jamaica was Nathan Foster, who was convicted of murder and hanged in 1988.

== History ==
The death penalty had been in Jamaica since it was a British colony, it was introduced under the Offences Against the Person Act 1864 with hanging as the approved method. Between 1945 and 1970, an average of five hangings were carried out a year. A 1979 motion was passed in the Parliament of Jamaica asking the Governor-General to review all pending death row cases, due to him having the royal prerogative of mercy, but executions gradually increased in the 1980s. Nathan Foster and Stanford Dinnal were the last people executed in Jamaica in 1988.

In 1999, a series of hangings - by some accounts, amounting to 50 - were scheduled by the Jamaican government, following the recent hangings (the first in 20 years) in Trinidad and Tobago. Ultimately, after international protests, the executions were not carried out. The Jamaican Parliament had placed a moratorium on the death penalty until 2009. The death penalty was suspended due to regular rulings from the Judicial Committee of the Privy Council in London overturning sentences. The Privy Council had previously ruled that the death penalty could only be used for the crime of aggravated murder and that the court must consider all mitigating circumstances and alternative sentences before a death sentence could be issued. In 2007, ahead of a United Nations motion calling for a worldwide suspension of the death penalty, the Jamaican government announced that they were looking at reintroducing hanging and the death penalty. The Parliament of Jamaica voted in 2008 to restore carrying out the death penalty. Since 2009, capital punishment is legal and executions in Jamaica could resume; however, there have been no executions since.

It was estimated in 2012 that there were seven or eight inmates in Jamaica were on death row. However, by 2018 this had been reduced to zero, with no executions having taken place.
