= Capital punishment in Costa Rica =

Capital punishment in Costa Rica was abolished in 1877. Costa Rica was one of five countries to abolish the death penalty for all crimes prior to the beginning of the 20th century.

Costa Rica and the United States signed an extradition treaty on November 10, 1922, that addresses the death penalty as imposed by the two nations. The treaty generally forbids Costa Rica from surrendering through extradition any criminal who would face the death sentence in the United States.
