= Capital punishment in Venezuela =

Capital punishment is not legal in Venezuela.

Venezuela was the first country (still existing) in the world to abolish the death penalty for all crimes, doing so by Constitution in 1864. San Marino had abolished the death penalty only for ordinary crimes in 1848, abolishing it for all crimes in 1865.

Costa Rica followed suit in 1877, making Venezuela one of just three countries to have abolished the death penalty by 1900.
