= Capital punishment in American Samoa =

Capital punishment is a legal punishment in American Samoa, an unincorporated territory of the United States. The only crime punishable by death is first degree murder. The last execution in American Samoa was on November 24, 1939, when Imoa of Fagatogo was hanged for the murder of Sella.

The territory is de facto abolitionist. In 2010, the territory did seek the death penalty for Siaumau Siaumau Jr., who was charged with the murder of police lieutenant Liusila Brown and the attempted murder of two other police officers. However, the request was withdrawn in 2012, at the urging of Governor Togiola Tulafono, who strongly opposed capital punishment and pointed out that the territory has no authorized execution method. In 2016, Siaumau Siaumau pleaded guilty to second degree murder and two counts of first degree assault. He was sentenced to life in prison with parole eligibility after 15 years for murder and concurrent 10-year terms on the assault charges.

Territorial statutes require the jury to be unanimous to impose a death sentence. The court cannot impose sentence of death if the jury fails to agree on the punishment. The only other sentence allowed for first degree murder is life imprisonment with the possibility of parole after 40 years. Statutes also do not provide for a method of execution.

== Legal process ==
When the prosecution seeks the death penalty, upon conviction a sentence of death is decided by the jury. Such decision must be unanimous.

In the event of a hung jury during the penalty phase of the trial, no death sentence can be issued, even if a single juror opposed death. There is no retrial.

== Capital crimes ==
First-degree murder is punishable by death if it involves one or more of the following aggravating factors:

1. The defendant previously has been convicted of first or second degree murder
2. At the time of the murder, the defendant committed another murder
3. The defendant created a grave risk of death to many persons
4. The murder was especially heinous, atrocious, or cruel, involving torture or other depravity
5. The murder was purposely committed for pecuniary gain for the defendant or another person

== See also ==
- Capital punishment in the United States
