= Capital punishment in Niue =

Capital punishment is not a legal penalty in Niue. While the death penalty was legal under New Zealand colonial rule, and death sentences were imposed by the courts, no executions were ever carried out. Capital punishment has been illegal in Niue since 1966, when the death penalty was effectively abolished by New Zealand colonial authorities.

The death penalty was legal under New Zealand colonial rule. The Cook Islands Act 1915, which governed both the Cook Islands and Niue, provided for the death penalty for both treason and murder. The method of execution was by hanging. When New Zealand temporarily abolished the death penalty for murder from 1941 to 1949, it did not extend abolition to Niue. When the government of Niue was split from the Cook Islands in 1957, the use of the death penalty was reaffirmed, and provision was made for executions to be carried out in New Zealand.

In 1921 a Niuean was sentenced to death for murder, but the sentence was later commuted to life imprisonment in New Zealand. The three Niueans who murdered New Zealand Resident Commissioner Cecil Hector Larsen in 1953 were sentenced to hang by a colonial court, and a gallows was shipped to Niue for the executions. After a public campaign, their sentence was commuted to life imprisonment in May 1954.

New Zealand abolished the death penalty for murder in 1961. Abolition was extended to Niue and the Cook Islands in 1962. The Niue Act 1966 did not include the offence of treason, effectively abolishing the death penalty in Niuean law.
