= Capital punishment in the British Indian Ocean Territory =

Capital punishment in the British Indian Ocean Territory is not permitted under the domestic law of the British Indian Ocean Territory (BIOT), in line with the position of all other British overseas territories.

Under the terms of a 1966 international agreement, most residents of the BIOT are members of the United States military and are correspondingly subject to United States military law for criminal acts, which allows for capital punishment. The agreement, however, also states: "A death sentence shall not be carried out in the Territory by the military authorities of the United States."

For those people who are subject to BIOT criminal law, which mostly applies to administrators and visitors within BIOT territorial waters, the Courts Ordinance 1983 provides that, in most circumstances and in the absence of specific local laws on the same topic, BIOT law is to be the same as "the law of England as from time to time in force in England".

Capital punishment in the United Kingdom was abolished for murder in 1965 and for all offences in 1998. Therefore, capital punishment was abolished under the BIOT domestic law at the same time.
