= Capital punishment in Monaco =

Capital punishment in Monaco was abolished in 1962.

The Constitution of Monaco of 17 December 1962, which outlawed the punishment, states:

"The death penalty is abolished."

The last execution took place in 1847.
