= Capital punishment in Colombia =

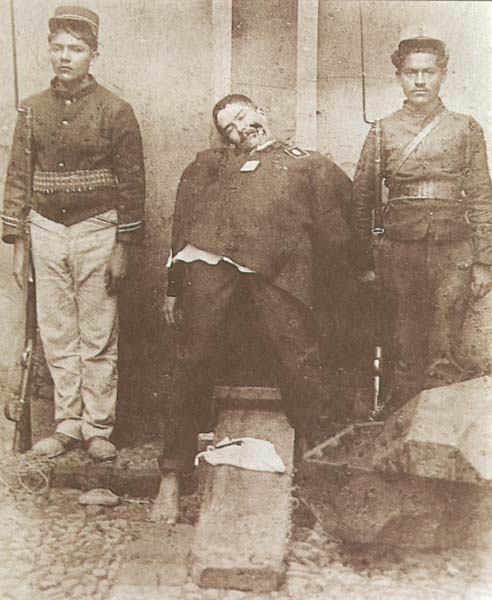
An execution in Medellín, before the abolition of capital punishment in Colombia. (c. 1906)

Capital punishment in Colombia was abolished by the 1910 constitution. In prohibiting the death penalty, the Colombian Constitution of 1991 states "The right to life is inviolable. There will be no death penalty."

The last person to be legally executed in Colombia was Manuel Saturio Valencia by firing squad on 5 May 1907 for arson.

== Internationally ==
Colombia voted in favor of the United Nations moratorium on the death penalty eight consecutive times: in 2007, 2008, 2010, 2012, 2014, 2016, 2018, and 2020. Colombia is a state party to the Second Optional Protocol to the International Covenant on Civil and Political Rights. Colombia acceded to the treaty on 5 Aug 1997.
