= Capital punishment in Lebanon =

Capital punishment was abolished in Lebanon on August 11, 2026. Lebanon was the first Arab country in the Middle East to do so. The last execution was carried out in 2004.

== History ==
=== 1994–2004 ===
In 1994, capital punishment in Lebanon became more frequent as the law became more strict in the aftermath of the 1975–1990 civil war. Fourteen people were executed from 1994 to 1998.

In 2004, Lebanon completed its last executions – three men, two of whom were executed by firing squad and one by hanging. They were the first people to be executed since 1998, when Salim Al-Huss became Prime Minister and refused to sign execution orders as he was an opponent of the death penalty.

=== Path to abolition ===
From 2004 to 2026, there was a 22-year-long unofficial moratorium on executions. Despite this, 85 people remained on death row during this time period. During this time, advocacy groups campaigned for the official abolition of the death penalty, including the Lebanese Association for Civil Rights (LACR), the National Campaign for the Abolition of the Death Penalty in Lebanon and the Association Justice and Mercy (AJEM).

In February 2026, a bill to abolish the death penalty and replace it with life imprisonment was approved by a parliamentary committee. The bill needed to be approved by the general assembly. In August 2026, the Lebanese Parliament abolished the death penalty, replacing it with "life imprisonment with hard labor."

With the abolition of the death penalty in Lebanon, the country became the 114th country to abolish the death penalty and the first Arab country to do so.

== Methodology ==
The statute books of Lebanon carried a long list of capital crimes, including murder, espionage, treason, terrorism, collaborating with Israeli forces and if the crime is especially heinous enough, rape, child rape, gang-robbery or gang-assault involving torture, arson against certain types of structures or sabotage of communications, transportation or industrial facilities causing death, aggravated assault involving torture, life-eligible crimes with recidivism, importing nuclear/toxic wastes, polluting rivers or waterways with harmful substances and some military offenses (e.g. desertion).

The methods prescribed by law were hanging and firing squad, although hanging had been the predominant method throughout Lebanese history. Carrying out an execution required approval from the Minister of Justice, the Prime Minister and the President.
