= Capital punishment in Guinea-Bissau =

Capital punishment was abolished in Guinea-Bissau in 1993. The country carried out its last execution in 1986. In February 1993, the National People's Assembly (Guinea-Bissau) passed an amendment to the constitution which abolished the death penalty for aggravated murder and treason.

Guinea-Bissau signed the Second Optional Protocol to the International Covenant on Civil and Political Rights on 12 Sep 2000, and ratified it on 24 Sep 2013.
