= Capital punishment in Ivory Coast =

Capital punishment was abolished by the Constitution in the Ivory Coast in 2000. However, there were reports in August 2011 of 26 extrajudicial executions, "including that of a 17-month-old baby". The Ivory Coast is not a state party to the Second Optional Protocol to the International Covenant on Civil and Political Rights.
