= Capital punishment in Namibia =

Capital punishment was abolished in Namibia in 1990. The last execution was carried out in 1988, under the rule of South Africa.

According to the constitution of the Republic of Namibia, there shall be no executions in Namibia, and no court or tribunal shall impose death as a competent sentence. Namibia acceded to the Second Optional Protocol to the International Covenant on Civil and Political Rights on 28 November 1994. Namibia voted in favour of the United Nations moratorium on the death penalty eight times, in 2007, 2008, 2010, 2012, 2014, 2016, 2018, and 2020.
