= Capital punishment in Bosnia and Herzegovina =

Capital punishment in Bosnia and Herzegovina is prohibited. It was abolished de facto for all crimes in November 1998 in the Federation of Bosnia and Herzegovina (the last execution thought to have been carried out there in 1977 for murder -- at that time the Socialist Republic of Bosnia-Herzegovina was still one of the constituent republics of Yugoslavia) and on June 21, 2000 in the Republika Srpska, the other of Bosnia and Herzegovina's two entities. However, it was only on October 4, 2019 that capital punishment was completely erased from the Constitution of the Republika Srpska. Until then, it was endorsed under Article 11 of the Constitution of the Republika Srpska.

Bosnia and Herzegovina is party to abolitionist international instruments, including the Council of Europe Protocol no.6 and Protocol no.13.

== Executions since 1959 ==
Source: SPSK Database

Executed person	Gender	Date of sentence	Date of execution	Place of execution	Crime	Method
Mijo Radoš	Male	1960	1960	Doboj	War crimes	Firing squad
Ivan Tomić	Male	1961	1961	Tuzla		Firing squad
Samid Istić	Male	1962	1962	Brčko	Murder of a policeman	Firing squad
Suljo Hrnić	Male	1963	1963	Travnik	Double murder	Firing squad
Milojko Arizanović	Male	1968	4 December 1968	Sarajevo	Double murder	Firing squad
Đuro Horvat	Male	21 December 1972	17 March 1973	Sarajevo	Terrorism	Firing squad
Mirko Vlasnović	Male	21 December 1972	17 March 1973	Sarajevo	Terrorism	Firing squad
Vejsil Keškić	Male	21 December 1972	17 March 1973	Sarajevo	Terrorism	Firing squad
Dragomir Bajčeta	Male	3 April 1972	August 1973	Sarajevo	Child murder	Firing squad
Višnja Pavlović	Female	3 April 1972	August 1973	Sarajevo	Child murder	Firing squad
Dušan Prodić	Male	8 September 1976	1977	Doboj	Murder	Firing squad
