= Capital punishment in the Comoros =

Capital punishment is a legal penalty in the Comoros. Currently, however, the country has a de facto moratorium in place; although the death penalty remains in the nation's penal code, it has not been used since the 1990s.

== History ==
The Comoros gained independence from France in 1975. Since then, the nation has carried out executions at a very infrequent pace, with the first post-independence execution reportedly having been carried out on 18 September 1996 when Youssouf Ali, a death row inmate, was denied the right to appeal and publicly executed by firing squad just days after a Comorian court sentenced him to death.

Shortly before Ali's execution, then-Comorian President Mohamed Taki Abdoulkarim announced his intention to crack down on murders, signaling that he would do so by promoting increased usage of the death penalty. He was reported to have complained about "[Comorian] justice being too slow" and remarking that "it moves at the speed of a tortoise." Shortly afterwards, on 31 December 1996, Said Ali Mohamed was sentenced to death; Youssouf Hamadi and Mohamed Youssouf followed on 3 and 4 January 1997, respectively. All three men were convicted of murder. Human rights organizations expressed concerns that since Comoros operated under Islamic law and therefore forbade executions to take place during the month of Ramadan (which was to begin on 10 January), the three men would be hastily executed before Ramadan started and forbidden from exercising their right to appeal.

On 29 May 1997, Mohamed Saidali, who went by the alias "Robin," was executed by firing squad. He had been convicted of armed robbery; a court issued his death sentence on 20 September 1996. On the same date, three other men, Mohamed Sahali, Ali Machallah, and an unidentified man, were also sentenced to death ostensibly for the same crime. Amnesty International expressed concerns that Sahali, Machallah, and the unidentified man would be imminently executed similarly to Saidali, although they were never executed. After Saidali's execution, the United Nations published a report criticizing Comorian authorities for not respecting Saidali's right to life. Like Youssouf Ali, Saidali had been denied the right to appeal.

To date, Saidali's execution is the most recent to have taken place in the Comoros.

== Recent developments ==
At the end of 2017, Amnesty International reported that the Comoros had 7 people on its death row. Amnesty also reported that the Comoros neither executed nor sentenced anyone to death in 2019. However, there was one single death sentence passed in the Comoros in 2020. Mohamed Zaidou, a native of Mali, was convicted of burning Foumbouni native Anlim Athoumani to death in his car on 28 April 2019 and condemned to die by the Assize Court of Moroni in October 2020. The prosecutor in the case requested 10-year sentences for Zaidou's accomplices.
