= Capital punishment in Saint Kitts and Nevis =

Capital punishment is a legal penalty in the Federation of St. Kitts and Nevis, and is carried out by hanging at His Majesty's Prison in Basseterre. The death penalty can only be applied for aggravated murder and treason.

Since gaining its sovereignty in 1983, St. Kitts and Nevis has executed only three individuals, with its most recent execution having been carried out in 2008, when Charles Laplace was hanged for murdering his wife. As of 2018, the country has no inmates on death row.

St. Kitts and Nevis voted against the United Nations moratorium on the death penalty in 2007, 2008, 2010, 2012, 2014, 2016, 2018, and 2020.
