= Capital punishment in Seychelles =

Capital punishment has been abolished in Seychelles. The country permanently abolished the death penalty by a Constitutional amendment in June 1993.

== History ==
The last execution by the authorities in Seychelles took place while the nation was still under British rule. The exact date of that execution, the method used in carrying out the execution, and the person executed, are unknown. In 1966, the country abolished the death penalty for murder and other civilian crimes, still while the country was under British colonial rule. Upon gaining independence from Britain in 1976, Seychelles confirmed their choice to do away with the death penalty. At the time, however, they retained the death penalty only for treason.

In July 1982, four mercenaries in a group of seven were sentenced to death in Seychelles for attempting to overthrow the country's government. The four men — Aubrey Brooks, a 38-year-old Zimbabwean; Jeremiah Puren, a 57-year-old South African; Roger England, a 26-year-old holding dual nationality in the United Kingdom and Zimbabwe; and Bernard Carey, a 38-year-old British national — all pleaded guilty to treason, the only crime punishable by death in Seychelles at the time. Their death sentences were passed in the nation's capital and largest city, Victoria. Another fifth man among the group, South African intelligence agent Martin Dolinchek, also pleaded guilty, but he received a 20-year prison sentence due to the court determining that he displayed remorse for his involvement in the attempted coup. A sixth, Robert Sims, a native of South Africa, only faced a maximum of 20 years in jail on charges of illegally importing arms into Seychelles as a part of the attempt. A seventh, a woman named Susan Ingles, had her charges dropped and was subsequently deported to South Africa. The mercenaries were a part of a group of 53 that was led by Mad Mike Hoare, a British-South African mercenary.

Brooks, Puren, England, and Carey were never executed, and Seychelles had no gallows at the time that they sentenced the mercenaries to death; all four were released from prison in 1983. Aubrey Brooks later wrote an autobiographical account of his experiences in which he mentions spending two years in prison for his involvement in the attempted coup; he also thanks the President of Seychelles, Albert Rene, for playing a considerable role in saving his life.

Press reports indicated that at the time of abolition, the method utilized in Seychelles was hanging. Hanging tended to be the standard method of execution among nations in the British Empire.

== Abolition ==
Prior to abolishing the death penalty, Seychellois lawmakers hesitated when it came to the question of abolishing the death penalty for certain serious non-murder crimes such as treason, other political crimes, or drug trafficking. This was a similar concern that other African countries that are now abolitionist dealt with as well, including São Tomé and Principe, Ivory Coast, and Mauritius. The debates within these countries all resulted in them abolishing the death penalty for all crimes, including those political and drug-related crimes. All of the countries that had these debates were countries that had spent a considerable amount of time not carrying out any executions prior to the abolition of the death penalty.

On 18 June 1993, the Constitution of the Republic of Seychelles was ratified. Article 15, Section 2 explicitly abolished the death penalty for all crimes, including both civilian and wartime crimes. Seychelles's abolition of the death penalty is also reflected in Section 194 of the country's penal code.

== Modern criminal justice measures ==
Seychelles is a signatory to the Second Optional Protocol to the International Covenant on Civil and Political Rights. The International Covenant on Civil and Political Rights is a multilateral treaty adopted by the United Nations; the Second Optional Protocol commits signatories to permanently prohibiting the death penalty within their borders.

Criminals who commit serious crimes in Seychelles are now subjected to life imprisonment as the maximum sentence possible under Seychellois law.
