= Capital punishment in North Macedonia =

North Macedonia on the map

Capital punishment in North Macedonia is prohibited by its Constitution.

Article 10 of the 1991 (amended in 2001) Constitution of North Macedonia states:

"The human right to life is irrevocable. The death penalty shall not be imposed on any grounds whatsoever in the Republic of Macedonia."

North Macedonia is a member of the Council of Europe. It has also signed and ratified Protocol No.13.

== Executions since 1959 ==
Source: SPSK Database

Executed person	Gender	Date of sentence	Date of execution	Place of execution	Crime	Method
Ismail Tairi	Male	1969	1969	Skopje	murder	firing squad
Miljaim Ćaili	Male	23 October 1974	1977	Skopje	double murder	firing squad
Malje Zeqiri	Male	4 February 1987	29 March 1988		child murder	firing squad
