= Capital punishment in Montenegro =

Capital punishment in Montenegro was first prescribed by law in 1798. It was abolished on 19 June 2002. The last execution, by shooting, took place on 29 January 1981, and the two last death sentences were pronounced on 11 October 2001. Montenegro is bound by the following international conventions prohibiting capital punishment: Second Optional Protocol to the International Covenant on Civil and Political Rights, as well as Protocols No. 6 and No. 13 to the European Convention on Human Rights. Article 26 of the Constitution of Montenegro that outlawed the death penalty states: "In Montenegro, capital punishment punishment is forbidden”.

== History ==
=== Kingdom of Montenegro (1798–1914) ===
Until 1851, Montenegro was a theocracy, ruled by an Orthodox Bishop and a Senate, composed of representatives of Montenegrin tribes, which enjoyed a full autonomy. The first written law was passed in 1789 (and amended in 1803), during the rule of Bishop Peter I. It prescribed the death penalty for murder and treason and allowed three modes of execution: hanging, shooting and stoning. The shooting was performed by representatives of all tribes (at times, several hundred men), in order to prevent the blood revenge by the offender's tribe. Although not prescribed by law, capital punishment was also applied to thieves. According to historical sources, "a thief was hanged and a murderer was shot" in 1831. In 1839/1840, "about 20 criminals" were executed. After Montenegro became a secular principality, a new penal code was adopted in 1855 (The Prince Danilo's Code). It prescribed capital punishment for 18 offences, including murder, treason, offences against the dignity of the Prince (lèse-majesté), various forms of theft, and refusal to pay tax. A man who kills his wife and/or her lover after finding them in adultery was exempt from all punishment. The legal mode of execution was shooting, but only for men. Women could not be shot (as it would "soil the rifles"), but were hung, drowned, or stoned instead. Executions of women were extremely rare – one documented case involved a woman stoned for murdering her husband in 1854. The first modern Penal Code, adopted in 1906, proscribed capital punishment for more than twenty offences. Execution was by shooting, performed by a firing squad of ten soldiers. The true number of death sentences and executions prior to 1914 is not known, but it was small: on the average, one or two executions per year. An exception to this were two political trials in 1908 and 1909, when 13 people accused of conspiring against the government were sentenced to death and 9 were executed.

=== Kingdom of Yugoslavia (1918–1941) ===
When Yugoslavia was created in 1918, different legal systems remained in force in different parts of the new country. In the north-western provinces (Bosnia and Herzegovina, Croatia, Slovenia and Vojvodina), executions were by hanging in an enclosed space with restricted public attendance. In the remainder of the country (Serbia, Kosovo, Montenegro and Macedonia), executions were by shooting and in public. When a single Penal Code was introduced for the whole country (1929), hanging remained the only legal mode of execution, with the exception of sentences passed by military courts, which were executed by shooting. Crimes punished by death were mostly murder, aggravated robbery, and terrorism. According to the official statistics, there were 14 death sentences and 5 executions in Montenegro from 1920 to 1940. In the same period, the whole of Yugoslavia had 904 sentences and 291 executions.

=== SFR Yugoslavia (1945–1991) ===
After World War II, many death sentences were passed on Nazi collaborators and war criminals, but also on the "enemies of the people", i.e. all those who opposed the new communist regime. There are no reliable data, but it seems likely that in Yugoslavia until 1951 there were as many as 10,000 death sentences, a majority of which were executed. In Montenegro, there may have been several hundred death sentences, approximately two thirds of which were executed. In addition to political offences, capital crimes included theft of government property, aggravated murder, and robbery. Until 1959, executions were either by shooting or by hanging, as determined by the sentence of the court in each individual case, although hangings were considered as an aggravated form and were used less frequently. In the first post-war years, executions of major war criminals were often public. After 1950, the number of death sentences fell sharply. According to the official statistics, from 1950 to 1958 there were 229 death sentences in all of Yugoslavia, while in Montenegro there were around 15.

The 1959 reforms resulted in a more lenient system of criminal justice. The number of capital offences was reduced and capital punishment was abolished for property offences. Hanging was abolished and shootings became the only legal method, performed by eight police officers, with half having firing blanks. Executions were performed privately. From 1959 to 1991, there was an average of 2 or 3 executions per year in Yugoslavia. In the same 32-year period, there were fewer than 10 executions in Montenegro. The last execution in Montenegro was in Kotor on 29 January 1981, for Dragiša Ristić, sentenced to death for aggravated murder.

=== Republic of Montenegro (1991–2006) ===
From April 1992, Montenegro was part of the Federal Republic of Yugoslavia, which consisted of the two federal units of Serbia and Montenegro. From 1991 to 2002, Montenegrin courts passed 8 death sentences, and 0 executions. The last 2 death sentences were passed by the Higher Court in Podgorica for Slavko Dević and Rade Arsović, convicted of murder. On 6 September 2001, Montenegro ratified the Second Optional Protocol to the International Covenant on Civil and Political Rights. Later, on 3 March 2004 they became a signatory to the European Convention on Human Rights.

=== Montenegro (2006-present) ===
Following independence in 2006, Montenegro began writing a new constitution. The new constitution was officially proclaimed on 22 October 2007. According to Article 26, "In Montenegro, capital punishment punishment is forbidden”.

== Abolition ==
=== Early attempts ===
In 1906, a pamphlet against capital punishment was published in Cetinje, and in 1907 the minister of justice informed the parliament that it was the prince's wish to have the death penalty abolished in Montenegro, except for treason. However, no amendments to the penal code were made in the parliament and capital punishment was retained.

=== Partial abolition (1992) ===
The constitution of the Federal Republic of Yugoslavia (which consisted of Serbia and Montenegro), adopted on 25/04/1992, abolished capital punishment for federal crimes (including genocide, war crimes, political and military offences), but the federal units kept the right to prescribe capital punishment for crimes under their jurisdiction (murder and robbery). In the drafting of the Constitution, the proposal to abolish capital punishment came from the Montenegrin members of the Drafting Commission.

=== Final abolition (2002) ===
On 19/06/2002, the Montenegrin Parliament amended the penal code by removing all references to capital punishment. As stated in the parliamentary debate, the motive for this was to join the Council of Europe.
