= Capital punishment in Nauru =

Capital punishment in Nauru was used prior to its independence in 1968. Following independence, capital punishment remained an option, but was not used. In May 2016, capital punishment in Nauru was outlawed.

== History ==
Prior to its independence, Nauru, as a British colony, fell under the purview of the 1899 Criminal Code of Queensland, a set of laws dating back to the 1860s. Following Nauruan independence, the 1899 Criminal Code of Queensland served as the basis for the laws on the island.

Following independence, Nauru had no formal capital punishment law. No executions took place in Nauru following its independence. However, the constitution allowed capital punishment law to be put in place. In 2010, amid constitutional reforms being suggested, the idea of removing capital punishment was considered. However, the removal of capital punishment failed as part of a referendum package.

Mathew Batsiua spoke in 2015 on the matter, saying that he believed most Nauruans supported the removal of capital punishment from the constitution, especially if the issue was handled on its own, as opposed to as part of a referendum package. Also in 2015, Amnesty International described Nauru, alongside Tonga, as states that were abolitionist in practice.

On 12 May 2016, with the passage of the Crimes Act 2016, capital punishment was outlawed in Nauru. It became the 103rd country to abolish the death penalty. However, the death penalty remained constitutionally legal, even if it is prohibited by law, as of 2021. A constitutional referendum would be needed to fully remove the death penalty from Nauruan law.

== International agreements ==
Nauru is not yet party to the Second Optional Protocol to the International Covenant on Civil and Political Rights. In December 2012, Nauru voted in favour of the Resolution (Resolution 67/176) on a Moratorium on the Use of the Death Penalty at the United Nations General Assembly. Nauru was not present for the vote in the UN General Assembly on a moratorium on the death penalty in December 2014. In 2022 and 2024, Nauru voted in favor of a global moratorium on the death penalty.

Despite having abolished the death penalty, Nauru voted against the UN Moratorium Resolution in 2018.
