= Capital punishment in Mozambique =

Capital punishment was abolished in Mozambique in 1990. The last execution took place in the country in 1986.

Mozambique acceded to the Second Optional Protocol to the International Covenant on Civil and Political Rights on 21 Jul 1993. Mozambique voted in favour of the United Nations moratorium on the death penalty eight times, in 2007, 2008, 2010, 2012, 2014, 2016, 2018, and 2020.
