= Capital punishment in Chad =

Capital punishment was abolished for all crimes in Chad on April 28, 2020, following a unanimous vote by the National Assembly of Chad. Prior to April 2020, Chad's 003/PR/2020 "anti-terrorism" law maintained capital punishment for terrorism-related offenses. Chad's new penal code, which was adopted in 2014 and promulgated in 2017, had abolished capital punishment for all other crimes.

== Most recent developments ==
=== 2003 ===
Prior to 2015, Chad's most recent executions had been on November 6, 2003, when four men – Mahamat Adam Issa, Moubarak Bakhit Abderahmane, Adouma Ali Ahmat, and Abdreahamane Hamid Haroun – were executed by firing squad at a military shooting range for the September 25 murder of Sheik Ibn Oumar Idriss Youssouf, a Sudanese businessman and the head of Chad Petroleum Company. The executions took place in N'Djamena in the presence of Chad's Justice Minister and Chief Prosecutor, as well as Chadian journalists, who photographed the executions and published the photographs in local papers. On the same day, three individuals convicted of unrelated murders were executed by firing squad elsewhere in N'Djamena, while another man was executed in Abéché. These eight executions were the first official ones to take place in Chad since 1991, when fourteen people were executed in a public square.

The Chadian government called Youssouf's murder (which was referred to as "the Adouma affair") a "heinous and particularly spectacular crime committed by felons in the middle of town," justifying the death penalty as a necessary "forceful response in order to regain the trust of foreign investors."

The executions were criticized by the Chadian League of Human Rights, who pointed out that the men convicted in the murder of the Sudanese businessmen received their death sentences following a three-day trial on October 25 and were not afforded the right to appeal their death sentences. On October 30, human rights activists and the men's lawyers sent a plea to Chadian President Idriss Déby, who ignored the plea and allowed the executions to move forward; the Chadian League of Human Rights learned on November 5, the day prior, that the men's executions were scheduled for November 6. Three days after those eight executions, a ninth man was executed.

=== 2004-2015 ===
In August 2004, nineteen people were sentenced to death in Chad. However, after the November 2003 executions, Chad experienced an informal moratorium, claiming in a 2008 report to the United Nations Human Rights Committee that, following the criticism of the Adouma affair executions, they had commuted all remaining death sentences to life imprisonment and continued their momentum towards abolishing the death penalty. This moratorium lasted until 2015, although some death sentences and pro-death penalty gestures were still passed between 2003 and 2015. For instance, in August 2008, former Chadian president Hissène Habré and eleven "opposition leaders" were convicted of "crimes against Chad's constitutional order, territorial integrity and security," and sentenced to death in absentia. At the time of the death sentence, Habré lived in Senegal while the Chadian government attempted to extradite him.

On two separate occasions, in 2008 and 2010, Chad signed a Note verbale de dissociation indicating their opposition to the United Nations General Assembly's resolutions on a global moratorium on the death penalty.

In July 2011, a man named Guidaoussou Tordinan was sentenced to death in N'Djamena for murdering his wife and injuring his mother-in-law in November 2009.

=== 2015 ===
In July 2015, Chadian authorities passed several counterterrorism measures that revived the death penalty in the country. The measures were passed in an attempt to address a spate of suicide attacks and bombings, including several in N'Djamena, in June and July 2015. On August 28, 2015, ten members of Boko Haram received death sentences for various crimes committed in June and July, including murder and using explosives. The next morning, at approximately 11:00 am, they were executed by firing squad. One of the executed men was Bahna Fanaye, described by Chadian officials as a Boko Haram "leader." Their executions were the first to take place in Chad since those in November 2003. Chad's revival of the death penalty and the executions of those ten Boko Haram members drew condemnation from the United Nations special rapporteur on extrajudicial summary or arbitrary executions, who criticized the Chadian government over allegations that the international human rights laws were violated during the men's trials and executions.
