= Capital punishment in Suriname =

Capital punishment was abolished in Suriname in 2015.

The last execution took place in 1982. By signing the Treaty of San José in 1987, the death penalty had already been abolished de facto.

== History ==
Since Suriname was a Dutch colony until 1975, it followed Dutch law. In 1911, Frans Killinger and six accomplishes were sentenced to death for a coup d'état, however the sentence was commuted. The last executions to take place were of the French convict Coutanceau, who had strangled a Chinese-Surinamese citizen during his escape attempt, by hanging in 1922, Rohanna who was executed for murder in 1923, and Apatoe who was hanged for murder in 1927. From independence in 1975 to 1980, capital punishment was on the statute books, but no crimes committed were considered severe enough to warrant prosecution for it.

From 1980 to 1987, during the period of military dictatorship, the death penalty was used by the military government in the early years of its rule to get rid of political opponents. The last judicial execution in Suriname was that of Wilfred Hawker, a sergeant-major in the Surinamese military who had staged two unsuccessful coup attempts to overthrow the military government. He was executed by firing squad on 13 March 1982. The government did carry out a series of extrajudicial executions in December 1982, when 15 imprisoned opponents of the military regime were shot without trial. The events would become known as the December murders.

== Law ==
The death penalty had already been abolished de facto by signing the Treaty of San José in 1987, and in March 2015, the National Assembly approved legislation formally abolishing the death penalty in Suriname. But the legislators raised the highest prison term limits from 30 to 50 years in what is seen as a compromise to amending the Criminal code.
