= Capital punishment in Uzbekistan =

Punishment In Uzbekistan

Capital punishment in Uzbekistan has been abolished.

On August 1, 2005, President Islam Karimov signed a decree stating that “the death penalty shall be cancelled in the Republic of Uzbekistan as of January 1, 2008, as a form of criminal punishment and shall be replaced by sentence for life or long prison terms”. The reason given for the three-year delay was the need to build new prisons to house people condemned to life terms instead of the death penalty.

The last execution in Uzbekistan took place in 2005.
