= Capital punishment in Benin =

Capital punishment has been abolished in Benin. It was abolished in 2016, as a result of a Constitutional Court of Benin ruling.

The last execution took place in Benin in 1987. Before the court decision, Benin was classified as "Abolitionist in Practice."
