= Capital punishment in Luxembourg =

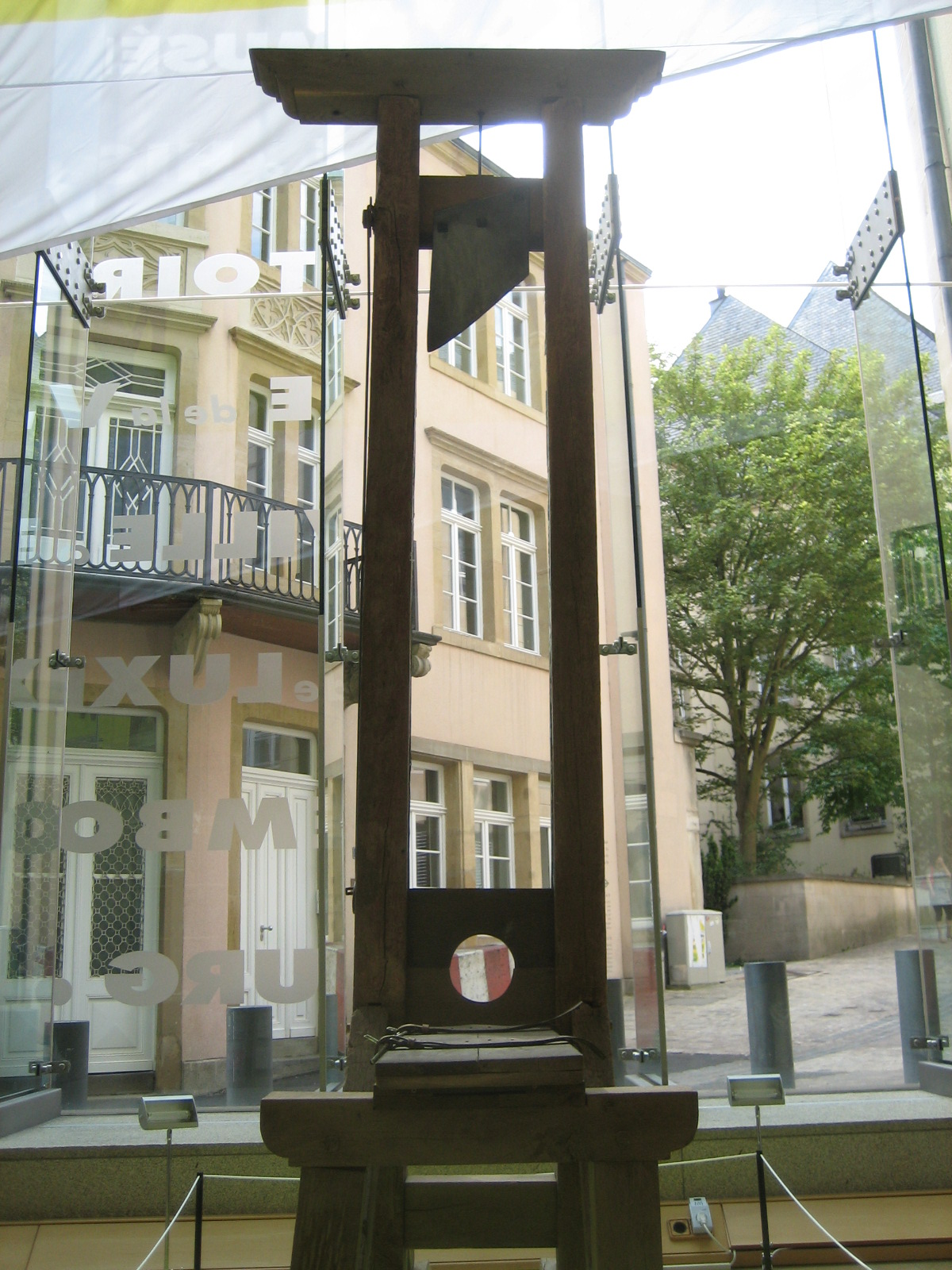
Guillotine used in Luxembourg from 1798 to 1821

Capital punishment in Luxembourg was abolished for all crimes in 1979.

After World War II, Luxembourgish courts sentenced 18 people, including 4 Germans and 11 Luxembourgish collaborators, to death for wartime crimes. Of those 18 convicts, 9 were executed, 7 were reprieved, and two sentenced in absentia. The last execution in Luxembourg took place in 1949.

Luxembourg's last execution for ordinary crimes occurred on 7 August 1948, when Nicolas Bernardy was shot for killing a family of three, as well as their farmhand and maid. Bernady was the only common criminal to be executed in Luxembourg since 1879.

Luxembourg is a member of the European Union and of the Council of Europe; and has also signed and ratified Protocol No.13. Luxembourg is also a state party to the Second Optional Protocol to the International Covenant on Civil and Political Rights; it signed the treaty on 13 February 1990 and ratified it on 12 February 1992. Luxembourg voted in favor of the United Nations moratorium on capital punishment all eight times, in 2007, 2008, 2010, 2012, 2014, 2016, 2018, and 2020.
