= Capital punishment in South Sudan =

Capital punishment is a legal penalty in South Sudan. It is covered under the Penal Code Act of South Sudan and allows for executions of individuals in the event of convictions for numerous crimes, including murder and terrorism. The sentences can be imposed by either civilian courts or the military. Between 2011 and 2018, at least 140 people have been put to death in South Sudan with hundreds more awaiting their sentence on death row, though due to a lack of reporting within the country exact numbers remain unknown. The country has faced criticism from international rights groups and multinational organizations for its use of capital punishment on juveniles. Not a party to the Second Optional Protocol to the International Covenant on Civil and Political Rights, South Sudan remains one of sub-Saharan Africa's largest users of the death penalty.

== History ==
South Sudan became independent in 2011 and has consistently failed to ban executions despite voting in favor of two United Nations resolutions that would put in place a moratorium on the death penalty. In its first year of independence in 2011, South Sudan was reported to have carried out five executions while another 150 were on death row. In 2018, the last year data was available, at least 7 executions were carried out with more than 300 on death row.

== In practice ==
The Penal Code outlines the crimes in which the death penalty can be used including murder, providing false testimony or evidence leading to another individual's execution, treason, high-level drug trafficking, and terrorism resulting in death. The president of South Sudan and the Supreme Court must approve an individual's death sentence in order for it be affirmed. Additionally, the constitution outlaws the imposition of the death penalty for those under the age of 18 or for mothers with children under the age of two.

Executions in South Sudan are typically carried out in either the Juba Central Prison near the capital city or Wau Central Prison located in the country's northwestern Bahr el Ghazal region. Officially, the method of execution is hanging, however the firing squad is known to have been used as well.

== Prominent cases ==
James Gatdet Dak, a spokesman for the prominent opposition party Sudan People's Liberation Movement and William Endley a former South African military officer who acted as an adviser for opposition forces were sentenced to death in 2018 for acts of treason. However they were pardoned by President Salva Kiir.

In February 2019, South Sudan executed seven people including three people from the same family, surpassing official numbers for the entire year of 2018.

== Criticism ==
South Sudan has faced criticism from organizations such as Amnesty International and Human Rights Watch for imposing capital punishment on juveniles, contrary to its own constitution. Amnesty claimed that 2 of the 4 people put to death in South Sudan in 2017 were below the age of 18 at the time of their conviction. In one notable case, a 16-year old was sentenced to death for a killing he claims was accidental that occurred when he was 15.

== See also ==
- Human rights in South Sudan
- LGBT rights in South Sudan
- South Sudanese Civil War
