= Capital punishment in Moldova =

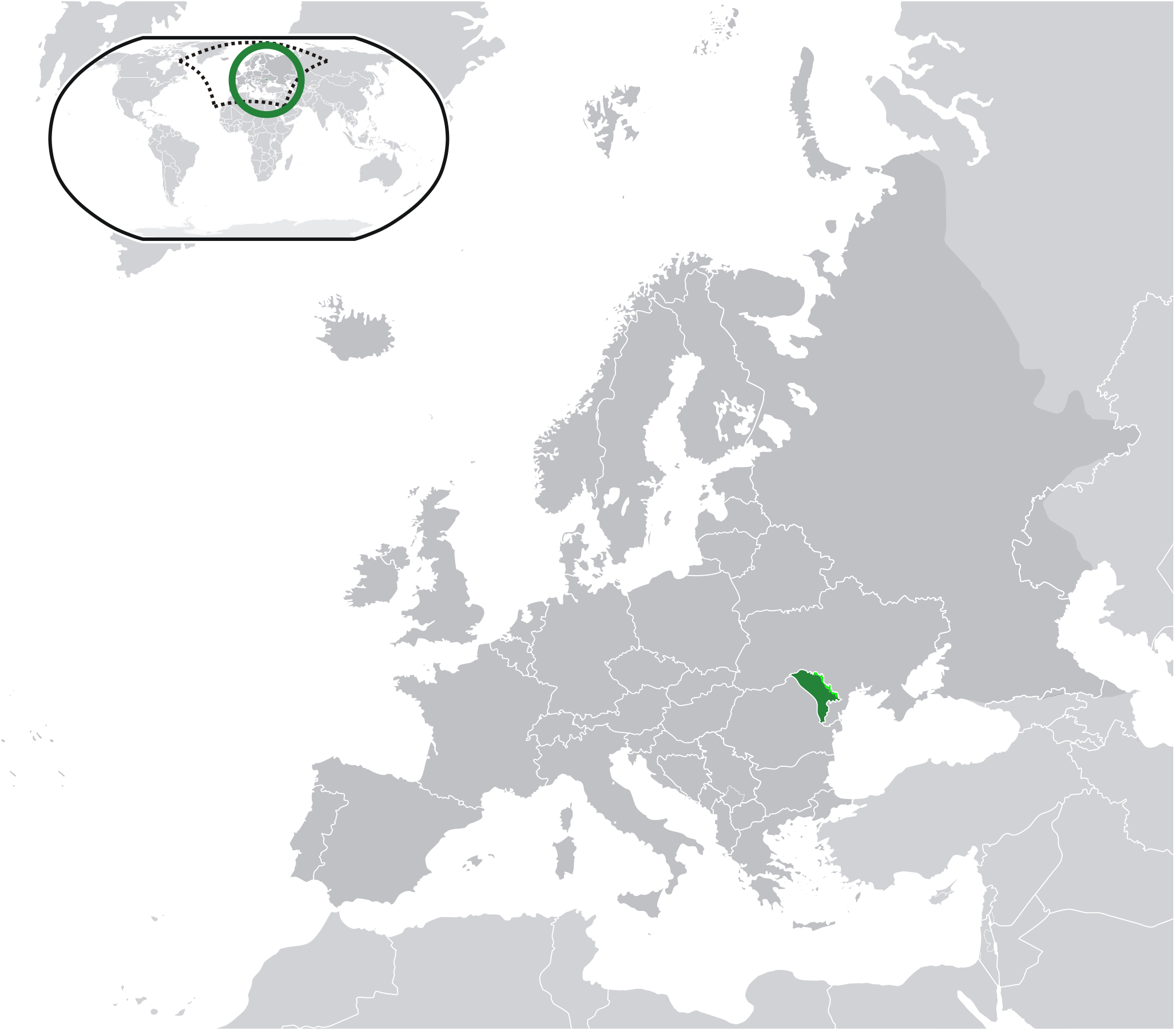
Location of Moldova (green) and Transnistria (light green) on the map

Capital punishment in Moldova was abolished in 2005.

Moldova has not executed anyone since its independence. The death penalty was first abolished in 1995, but, until 2006, the Constitution retained it for crimes committed during war or during an inevitable threat of war.

Moldova is a member of the Council of Europe. It has also signed and ratified Protocol No.13.

The partially recognized state of Transnistria, which declared its independence in 1990, retains capital punishment, but has had a moratorium in place.

== See also ==
- Human rights in Moldova
