= Capital punishment in Senegal =

Capital punishment was abolished in Senegal in 2004. The country carried out its last execution in 1967.

Senegal is not a state party to the Second Optional Protocol to the International Covenant on Civil and Political Rights. It did not vote during the United Nations moratorium on the death penalty resolution in 2020.
