= Capital punishment in Lesotho =

Capital punishment in Lesotho is legal. However, despite not having any official death penalty moratorium in place, the country has not carried out any executions since the 1990s and is therefore considered de facto abolitionist.

== Capital punishment law ==
Lesotho's death penalty law treats the death penalty as a mandatory punishment for capital crimes that a judge must impose unless there are mitigating factors. However, Mosotho judges still rarely hand down death sentences, and it is also extremely rare for appellate courts to uphold death sentences. In 2021, there were only two people on death row in the country, although in recent years prior, death row had remained empty due to both the number of times judges refused to hand down death sentences, and the number of times appellate courts would not uphold death sentences on appeal.

Although Lesotho is de facto abolitionist, the country is not a signatory or a party to any of the United Nations protocols that would signify their commitment to abolishing the death penalty, including the International Covenant on Civil and Political Rights (ICCPR) and the Second Optional Protocol to the ICCPR pertaining to the abolition of the death penalty within each signatory's borders. When it came to the United Nations moratorium resolution, Lesotho abstained from voting. Lesotho has also abstained from voting on all four of the United Nations General Assembly's Resolutions on a Global Moratorium on the use of the death penalty, and it has rejected the United Nations Human Rights Council's recommendation to formalize a moratorium on the death penalty, abolish capital punishment, or amend its death penalty laws so that it abides by its international treaty obligations.

Executions in Lesotho are carried out by hanging. However, Lesotho does not have a formal professional executioner or hangman; for Lesotho's latest execution, authorities brought over a hangman from another country to carry it out.

All death sentences handed down in Lesotho are subjected to an automatic appeal process. The sentences are handed down by a High Court, after which the Court of Appeals reviews the sentences. It is extremely rare in Lesotho for a death sentence to withstand the appeals process; most death sentences are overturned on appeal.

== Pre-independence history ==
One prominent historical example of a death penalty case in Lesotho prior to its independence from the United Kingdom occurred in 1948, when Chief Bereng Griffith Lerotholi, the principal chief of Phamong, and Chief Gabasheane Masupha, the principal chief of 'Mamathe in Berea, were convicted of carrying out the drowning medicine murder, or diretlo, of a man named 'Meleke Ntai on 4 March 1948. After being sentenced to death on 15 November 1948, they were executed by hanging at dawn on 3 August 1949. The chiefs' executions took place in a jail in Maseru, the capital of Lesotho, then known as Basutoland. The chiefs had several accomplices in carrying out the murder, and some of the accomplices were executed as well.

The highly publicized executions of Chiefs Lerotholi and Masupha, two high-ranking officials, were hoped to have been deterrents to prevent others from carrying out similar crimes, but similar murders continued occurring anyway, albeit less consistently. Another pre-independence death penalty case in Lesotho occurred in the 1950s, when another prominent chief and his accomplice were sentenced to death in November 1953 for the medicine murder of a man named Makotomane Mokale.

On 9 February 1962, a group of eight people - four men and four women - kidnapped a two-year-old girl from her home and kept her in another village for two weeks, torturing her before they murdered her. The motive was again medicine. The participants, identified as Tsiu Lethola, Mookameli Lethola, Matsoana Lethola, Masaemone Lethola, Mapholo Lethola, Thebethe Mahaliza, Mamolieki Mahalika, and Malethola Lethola, were all arrested and put on trial for their involvement in the crime. On 5 March 1963, the Basutoland News reported that the High Court in Maseru had sentenced all eight people to death on 8 February 1963. The Lesotho Court of Appeals upheld the appellants' death sentences in June of the same year. It is unclear if or when any of them were executed.

== Post-independence history and recent developments ==
Lesotho reported to the United Nations Human Rights Council that the last execution they carried out was in 1995. The man who was executed was Veddie Nkosi (also alternately known as Sello Nkosi, or Veddie Sello Nkosi, although shortly before his execution, he claimed to actually be a Zambian national named Edward Donald Nduba), who was between 30 and 40 years of age, and he was convicted of the murder of a woman named Makamohelo Tsola as he broke into her house near Maseru, robbed her, and raped her. Nkosi's death sentence was upheld by Lesotho's Court of Appeals on 16 July 1993, and Nkosi was executed by hanging on 25 November 1995. In previous executions, Lesotho imported a hangman from neighbouring South Africa to carry out the sentence; in this case, Mosotho officials imported a hangman from Zimbabwe. A second hangman also showed up to provide the first with "moral support." A witness to the execution was so disturbed by what she saw, that she reported that the execution disturbed her sleep and caused her to have nightmares.

In 2003, the Sexual Offences Act added rape by a knowingly HIV-infected person to its list of capital offences. However, the ruling permitting the death penalty for this crime was overturned in 2022, when the Constitutional Division of the High Court of Lesotho ruled it unconstitutional. The High Court's ruling followed the conviction of an unnamed defendant for committing a sexual offense while knowingly being HIV-positive. The defendant's trial court remanded sentencing duties to Lesotho's High Court because the trial court lacked the authority to impose a death sentence, and the death penalty was the mandatory sentence for the crime at the time. The unnamed inmate's attorney challenged the constitutionality of the sentencing law under the grounds that it violated Lesotho's Constitution and its guarantees to "the right to life, freedom from inhuman treatment, respect for private life, a fair trial, freedom from discrimination, and equality before the law and equal protection of the law." In declaring the law unconstitutional, the High Court of Lesotho did not altogether remove the death penalty as a sentencing option for the crime, but they altered the law so that the death penalty was not the mandatory sentence for it, declaring that the trial court should have the jurisdiction and discretion to determine an appropriate sentence on a case-by-case basis.

Although Lesotho is considered a de facto abolitionist country due to its latest execution having occurred in 1995, there is no official moratorium on the death penalty in the country.
