= Capital punishment in Timor-Leste =

Capital punishment has been abolished in Timor-Leste (formerly East Timor). It was abolished in 1999 following East Timor independence. East Timor voted in favor of the United Nations moratorium on the death penalty in 2007, 2008, 2010, 2012, 2014, 2016, 2018, and 2020. East Timor acceded to the Second Optional Protocol to the International Covenant on Civil and Political Rights on 18 September 2003.

== History ==
Executions occurred during Portuguese colonial rule and while Timor-Leste was part of Indonesia. Thousands of extrajudicial executions and killings took place during the East Timor genocide.
