= Capital punishment in Djibouti =

Capital punishment was abolished in Djibouti in 1995. There have been no executions in Djibouti since independence from France on 27 June 1977. The country acceded to the Second Optional Protocol to the International Covenant on Civil and Political Rights on 5 November 2002.
