= Capital punishment in Slovenia =

Europe holds the greatest concentration of abolitionist states (blue). Map current as of 2022 Abolished for all offences Abolished in practice Retains capital punishment

Capital punishment was abolished in Slovenia in 1989, when it was still a Socialist Federal Republic of Yugoslavia (although it was not abolished on the federal level). When Slovenia became independent and introduced its democratic constitution on 23 December 1991, capital punishment became unconstitutional. On 1 July 1994, Protocol No. 6 of the European Convention on Human Rights came into force. Later Slovenia also adopted the Second Optional Protocol to the International Covenant on Civil and Political Rights.

The last person executed in Slovenia was Franc Rihtarič, who was executed by firing squad on 30 October 1959 in Maribor.
