= Capital punishment in Burundi =

Capital punishment was abolished in Burundi on 24 April 2009. Burundi is not a state party to the Second Optional Protocol to the International Covenant on Civil and Political Rights. The last legal execution in Burundi took place in 1997.

However, extrajudicial executions are common in Burundi. On 18 February 2016, the then-Defense Minister Emmanuel Ntahomvukiye stated that the death penalty should be reinstated in Burundi, although that has not happened yet.
