= Capital punishment in Cape Verde =

Capital punishment is not a legal punishment under the prevailing Cape Verdean law. The highest sentence is 25 years. The last execution was carried out in 1835, when the islands were part of the Portuguese Empire.
