= Capital punishment in Liechtenstein =

Capital punishment was abolished in Liechtenstein for murder in 1987 and for treason in 1989.

The last death sentence was pronounced in 1977, when a 42-year-old man was sentenced to be hanged for the 1976 murders of his wife and two children; the sentence was later commuted by Franz Josef II to 15 years of imprisonment.

The last execution was carried out in 1785, when Barbara Erni, a 42-year-old homeless woman from Altenstadt in Feldkirch was beheaded for burglary and theft.
