= Political dissent =

Dissatisfaction with or opposition to the policies of a governing body

Political dissent is a dissatisfaction with or opposition to the policies of a governing body. Expressions of dissent may take forms from vocal disagreement to civil disobedience to the use of violence.

The Constitution of the United States regards non-violent demonstration and disagreement with the government as fundamental American values.

== Techniques ==
- Protests, demonstrations, peace march, protest march
- Boycotts, sit-ins, riots, organizing committees, grassroots organizing
- Strike, general strike, street action
- Bumper stickers, flyers, political posters
- Street theater, political puppets
- Burning an effigy
- Self-immolation (setting self on fire)
- Revolution, revolt, rebellion, terrorism, insurrection, popular uprising
- Samizdat
- Propaganda, counter-propaganda, slogans, sloganeering, meme
- Lobbying

== See also ==
- Civil disorder
- Dissent
- Dissident
- Dissenting opinion
- Opposition (politics)
- Political prisoner
- Prisoner of conscience
