= Pishchalauski Castle =

Castle and prison in Minsk, Belarus

- Пішчалаўскі замак (Belarusian); Пищаловский замок (Russian)
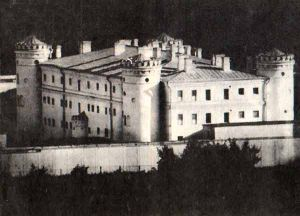
- Interactive map of the Pishchalauski Castle area
- Alternative names: Pischalauski Castle; Piszczalauski castle

General information
- Location: Valadarskaha Street; Minsk, Belarus
- Coordinates: 53°53′56″N 27°32′52″E
- Completed: 1824
- Inaugurated: 1825

Design and construction
- Architect: Kazimir Khrschonovich

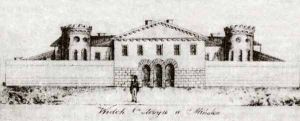
Drawing, 19th century

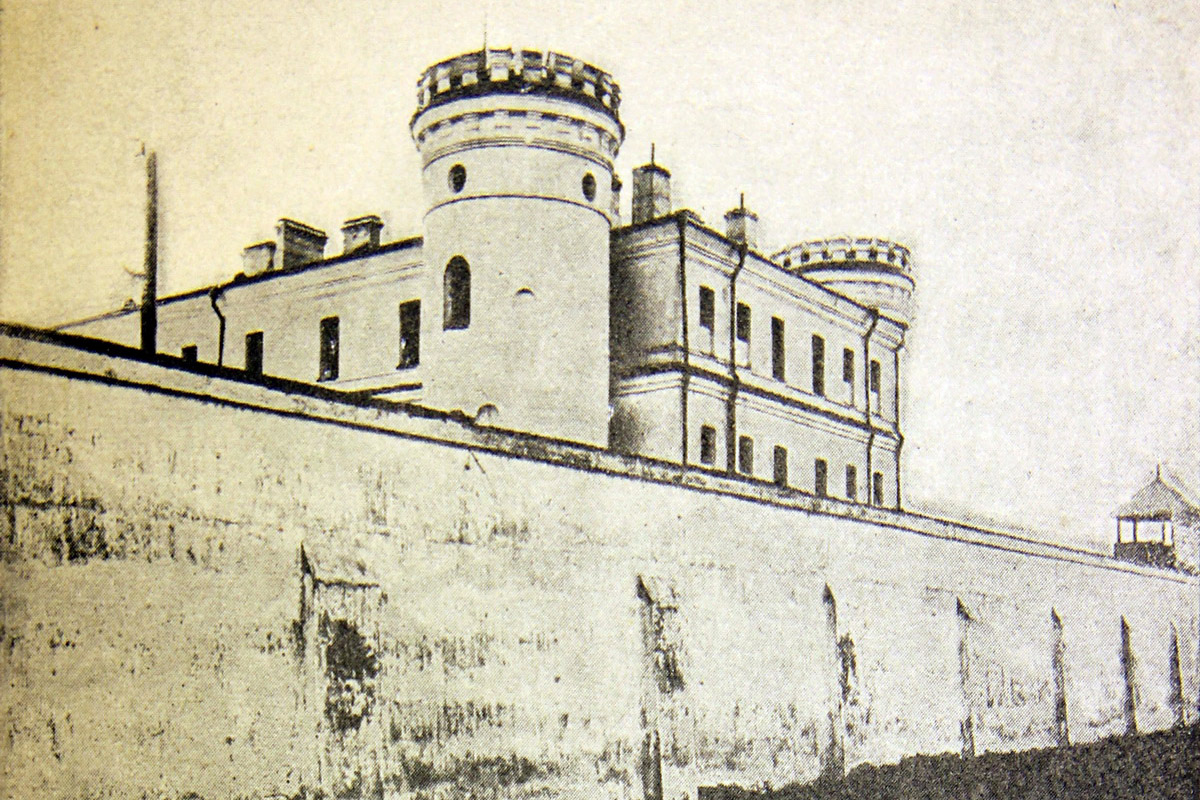
Photo, 1927

The Minsk Detention Center No. 1 or SIZO No. 1 (Russian: СИЗО No. 1, Belarusian: СІЗА No. 1), informally known as Volodarka, Belarusian pronunciation: Valadarka (Валадарка), is the central prison of Belarus located in Minsk.

== Name ==
The prison castle is known in Belarusian as Pishchalauski Castle (Пішчалаўскі замак), also spelled Pischalauski Castle, a name derived from the landlord who built it, Rudolph Pischallo. The Russian version of the name is Pishchalovsky castle.

Its popular name, Volodarka, was coined after the October Revolution, when the street on which the building stood was renamed in honour of revolutionary leader V. Volodarsky. It is also sometimes called the Belarusian Bastille.

== Current usage ==
Operated by the Belarusian Ministry of Internal Affairs, SIZO No. 1 is the only facility that houses death row inmates. Their execution occurs at the prison. The prison is also used as a pre-trial detention centre where arrested political activists are held.

== History ==
=== Russian Empire ===
The stone building was completed by 1824, and it was commissioned in spring 1825. The castle-shaped structure was purposely built as a prison by the landowner Rudolph Pischallo (also spelled Rudolf Pischalo), who entrusted architect Kazimir Khrschonovich (also spelled Casimir Hrschanovicha) with the design. The project was approved by Tsar Nicholas I himself. The main building is three stories high, flanked by four corner towers, and surrounded by the prison yard.

==== Inmates and executions ====
- Vintsent Dunin-Martsinkyevich (c. 1808–1884), Belarusian writer and social activist (imprisoned 1864–1865)
- Felix Dzerzhinsky, future leader of the Soviet secret police, here repeatedly on transfer during his arrests for "revolutionary activity"
- Alés Harun (1887–1920), Belarusian writer (imprisoned 1907)
- Karuś Kahaniec (1868–1918), Belarusian writer (imprisoned 1905–1906 & 1910–1911)
- Jakub Kołas (1882–1956), Belarusian writer (imprisoned 1908–1911)
- Józef Piłsudski (1867–1935), future Polish statesman, held here while under investigation after being arrested in 1887
- Ivan Pulikhov (Pulichaŭ; 1879–1906), revolutionary terrorist who attempted to assassinate the Minsk governor, hanged at the prison gates
- Masha Bruskina (1924–1941), Belarusian Jewish partisan, hanged publicly by the Nazis on October 26, 1941.

=== Soviet Union ===
After the First World War, the prison was taken over by the Cheka-GPU. Famous Socialist Revolutionary Boris Savinkov, arrested after being lured back to Soviet territory as part of operation "Trust", was held here for a while in 1924.

On the night of 29/30 October 1937, during Stalin's Great Terror, NKVD officers executed 36 representatives of Belarusian culture, science and art in the castle basement, by shooting them in the head. Another 52 were executed that night in the basement of the building of the internal prison of the NKVD in Minsk near the Pishchalovsky castle. In total, during the repressions of 1937–1940, about 100 people were executed in the Pishchalovsky Castle, accused of anti-Soviet activities.

==== World War II ====
As a result of the Soviet invasion of Poland starting on September 17, 1939, a large number of Polish POWs (military, police, and civil servants) as well as Polish common criminals were imprisoned at Pishchalauski Castle. In 1940–1941, the prisoner was Ryszard Kaczorowski, later the last President of Poland-in-exile.

After the Nazi invasion of the Soviet Union, the Germans kept on using the prison as such.

During the Great Patriotic War, arrested partisans and members of the underground were kept in the Pishchalovsky Castle. Some were executed or tortured there.

==== After World War II ====
In the years 1944–1945 the prisoner was Kazimierz Świątek, later a cardinal of the Roman Catholic Church.

After 1953, it was the only institution in the Byelorussian SSR where death sentences were carried out.

In chronological order of execution:

- Vasyl Meleshko (1917–1975), Ukrainian participant in the Khatyn massacre (no connection to Katyn massacre)
- Valery Nekhaev (1948–1983), Soviet murderer
- Hryhoriy Vasiura (1915–1987), Ukrainian Red Army Lt., later POW and Nazi collaborator, who took part in the Khatyn massacre
- Gennady Mikhasevich (1947–1987), Soviet serial killer

== Independent Belarus ==
Pishchalauski Castle is a registered state architectural monument. As of 2013, it was in urgent need of major repairs, with part of one of its four towers having collapsed in April 2008. As of 2013, there were speculations that "Volodarka" might be transformed into a museum. In April 2024 the prison closed.

=== Opponents of the Lukashenko government ===
People arrested during and after the 1996 Belarusian referendum and the Minsk Spring and detained in Pishchalauski Castle include:

- Vadzim Kabanchuk, politician and military commander, detained from September 1997 to March 1998

People arrested during and after the 2020 presidential campaign, which led to the contested reelection of Alexander Lukashenko, and detained in Pishchalauski Castle include:

- Andrej Aliaksandraŭ, journalist
- Mikola Dziadok (born 1988), Belarusian activist; arrested for "violation of public order", etc.
- Alaksandar Kabanaŭ (born 1971), аuthor of the YouTube channel "People's Reporter", associate of Sviatlana Tsikhanouskaya, charged for "violat[ing] public order"and "insulting a government official", sentenced to 3 years in prison
- Maria Kalesnikava, musician, politician
- Ihar Losik, blogger
- Siarhiej Piatruchin, blogger
- Roman Protasevich (born 1995), Belarusian activist; arrested after his flight, Ryanair Flight 4978, was diverted to Minsk for a false bomb threat
- Marfa Rabkova, human rights defender
- Illia Salei (born 1991), Belarusian lawyer; arrested for "threatening the national security of Belarus"
- Rostislav Shavel (born 2001), Belarusian footballer; arrested for participating in a march
- Yuliya Sluckaya, media manager
- Aliaksandr Vasilievič, businessman
- Maxim Znak (born 1981), Belarusian lawyer and politician; arrested for "conspiracy to seize state power in an unconstitutional manner" and "establishing and leading an extremist organization".
- Maryna Zolatava, editor-in-chief of tut.by

==== Executions ====
In chronological order of execution:

- Igor Mirenkov (1969–1996), Soviet-Belarusian serial killer
- Sergey Pugachev (1972–2005), Belarusian serial killer and member of The Polotsk Four
- Yuri Kurilsky (1979–2007), Belarusian serial killer
- Alexander Sergeychik (1970–2007), Belarusian serial killer
- Eduard Lykov (1960–2014), Russian-born Belarusian serial killer
- Ivan Kulesh (1986–2016), Belarusian serial killer
- Alexey Mikhalenya (1984–2018), Belarusian serial killer

== See also ==
- Amerikanka prison in Minsk
- Capital punishment in Belarus
- Kurapaty, woods outside Minsk where a vast number of people were executed by Stalin's NKVD in 1937–1941
- Okrestina prison in Minsk
- State Security Committee of the Republic of Belarus aka KGB of Belarus
