= Ivan Kravtsov =

- Іван Краўцоў
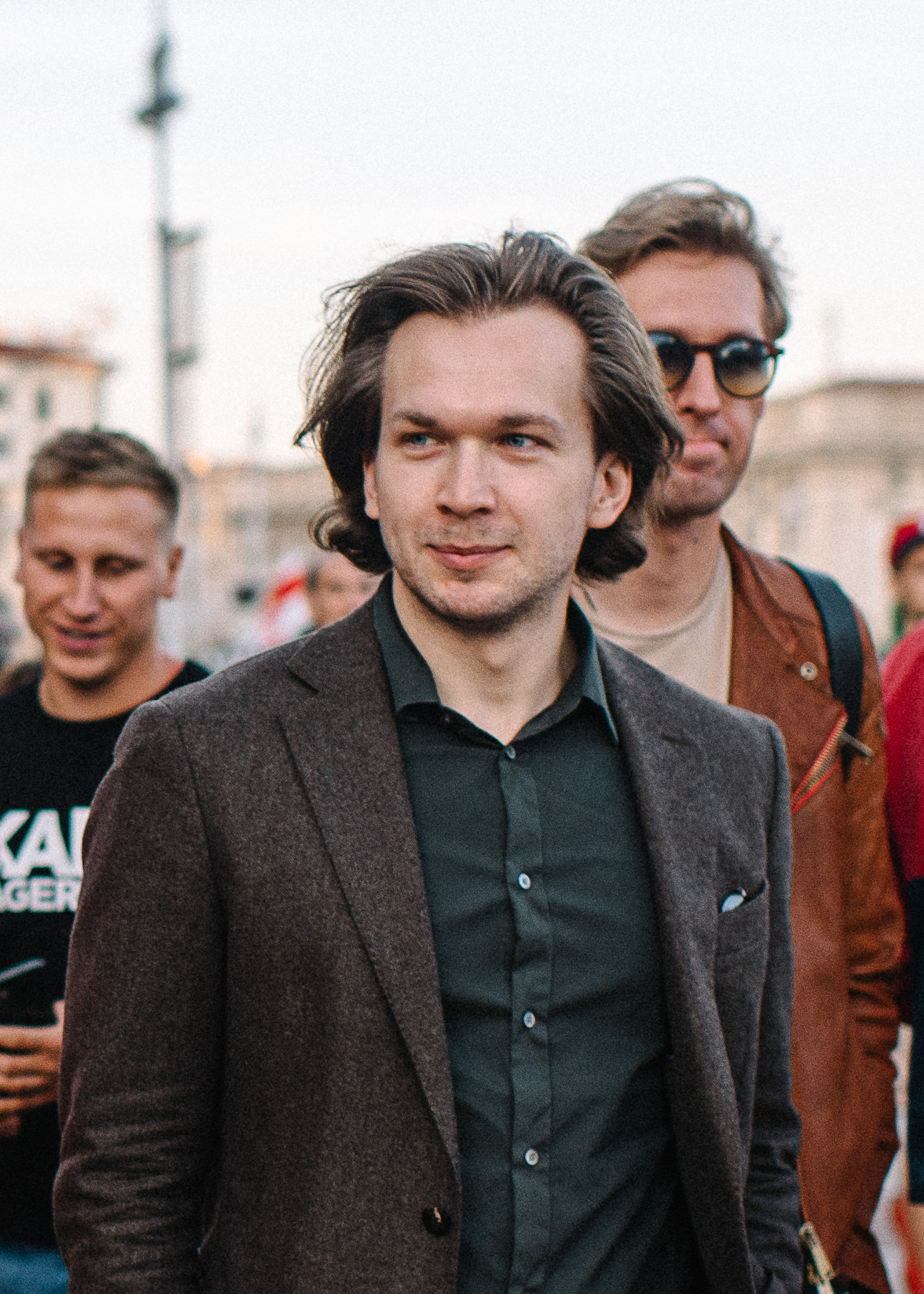
- Kravtsov in Minsk, 22 August 2020

Delegate of the Coordination Council (4th convocation)
- Incumbent
- Assumed office 19 May 2026

Executive Secretary of the Coordination Council
- In office August 2020 – 10 August 2026

Personal details
- Born: 10 June 1989 (age 37) Minsk, Byelorussian SSR, Soviet Union
- Citizenship: Belarus
- Party: Razam
- Education: Master of Economics
- Alma mater: Belarusian National Technical University, Belarus State Economic University, University of Exeter
- Occupation: Political activist, architect, manager
- Known for: 2020 Belarusian presidential election, Coordination Council

Ivan Yevgenyevich Kravtsov (Belarusian: Іван Яўгенавіч Краўцоў; born 10 June 1989) is a Belarusian political activist, architect and manager. He was executive secretary of the Coordination Council, the representative body of the Belarusian democratic forces, from its formation in August 2020 until August 2026, and is a delegate of the council's fourth convocation. He was a member of the campaign team of presidential candidate Viktar Babaryka in the 2020 Belarusian presidential election and of the organising committee of the party Razam. In September 2020 he was forcibly taken to the Ukrainian border by Belarusian security services together with Maria Kalesnikava and the council's press secretary Anton Radniankou; Kalesnikava tore up her passport at the border and stayed in Belarus, while Kravtsov and Radniankou were expelled to Ukraine.

== Early life ==
Kravtsov was born in Minsk on 10 June 1989. His mother, Lyudmila Kravtsova, is a Belarusian singer. His father, Yevgeny Kravtsov (1964–2012), was a co-owner and chairman of MinskComplexBank, a Minsk-based commercial bank that was merged into Belarusbank in 2005. In August 2002, a few months after he had stepped down as chairman, Yevgeny Kravtsov was detained by the KGB on a night train from Minsk to Moscow in the presence of his family; Kravtsov, then 13, later described his father's case as political. His father spent a year and a half in the KGB pre-trial detention centre in Minsk, and in April 2004 a Minsk district court sentenced him to nine years in prison with confiscation of property; he served part of the term in a penal colony in Babruysk. His grandmother, Halina Kravtsova, is a professor of economics at the Belarus State Economic University.

== Career ==
=== Pre-politics ===
Kravtsov at the TIKOTA INCLUSIVE presentation at the Luch factory store, November 2018. In front: Paralympic champion Aliaksandr Tryputs and Miss Wheelchair World Alexandra Chichikova; behind them, brand founder Ekaterina Bezrukova and Anton Radniankou

Ivan is also a founder and art director of Architectural bureau 35, based in Minsk. Until May 2019, Ivan Kravtsov worked as Chief Strategy Officer at Minsk Watch Factory "Luch."

Among the bureau's projects was the Olympic Park residential development; Kravtsov also lectured at BNTU. During Kravtsov's tenure at Luch, the factory updated its logo and corporate identity, relaunched its marketing department and released a series of limited-edition collaborations with Belarusian artists and media personalities — including watches featuring the letter Ŭ, the "Vyshyvanka" collection and models made with World of Tanks; Kravtsov also oversaw the construction of the factory's new building.

=== 2020 presidential election ===
In May 2020 Kravtsov joined the campaign team of the banker and presidential candidate Viktar Babaryka as executive manager for public relations. On 28 July 2020, together with Maria Kalesnikava and other members of the team, he petitioned the KGB of Belarus to change the measure of restraint applied to Babaryka, who had been arrested in June.

=== Coordination Council ===
On 18 August 2020, after the election, political and civic activists announced the creation of the Coordination Council to hold talks with the Belarusian authorities on a peaceful transfer of power. Its members included the Nobel laureate Svetlana Alexievich, the artist and designer Vladimir Tsesler, Tsikhanouskaya's representative Volha Kavalkova, the lawyer of Babaryka's campaign Maxim Znak and Maria Kalesnikava. Kravtsov was part of the council from its foundation as its executive secretary, a post he held for six years, until August 2026.

On 1 September 2020 he was summoned for questioning by the Investigative Committee and interviewed as a witness in a criminal inquiry under Article 361 of the Criminal Code (creation of an extremist formation). In January 2023 the Belarusian authorities designated the Coordination Council an "extremist formation", and in November 2023 more than 130 searches connected with the council's members were carried out in Belarus. On 23 January 2024 the Investigative Committee announced that it had opened special (in absentia) proceedings against Kravtsov in connection with his work in the council, on charges including conspiracy to seize state power and creation of an extremist formation. On 16 May 2024 the Minsk City Court sentenced him in absentia to 11 years in a high-security penal colony. On 14 June 2024 the Ministry of Internal Affairs added him to its "list of persons involved in extremist activity"; he was also included by the KGB in its list of persons involved in terrorist activity.

In spring 2024 Kravtsov ran in the election to the council's third convocation on the Youth Offensive list. He was not elected as a delegate, but in July 2024 he was re-elected secretary for a third consecutive term with 68% of the delegates' votes.

In May 2026 he ran again, on the Nastup list, and was elected a delegate of the council's fourth convocation; 2,113 Belarusian citizens took part in the vote. On 10 August 2026 he stepped down as secretary, and took up his mandate as a delegate; under the council's statute the head of the secretariat cannot hold a delegate's mandate.

=== Abduction of Maria Kalesnikava and forced expulsion ===
Kravtsov (right) and Anton Radniankou at a press conference in Kyiv on 8 September 2020, the day after their forced expulsion from Belarus

On 7 September 2020 the media reported that Maria Kalesnikava, the coordinator of Babaryka's campaign, had disappeared. She went missing together with Kravtsov and the council's press secretary, Anton Radniankou.

As emerged later, Kravtsov had been taken to the Financial Investigations Department of the State Control Committee, where unidentified security officers threatened him with a 12-year prison term and demanded that he drive Kalesnikava out of the country in his own car. In the officers' account, the operation was meant to "de-escalate" the political situation, with state media to report that the "leaders had become disillusioned with the protest".

The same day Kravtsov's flat was searched. Although KGB officers threatened Kalesnikava with prison or death, she managed to stay in the country by deliberately tearing up her passport at the Belarusian–Ukrainian border. Kravtsov and Radniankou crossed into Ukraine, although Alexander Lukashenko announced that he had requested their extradition; Ukraine's Deputy Interior Minister Anton Gerashchenko described their arrival as a "forcible expulsion" from Belarus.

On 11 September the State Control Committee opened a criminal case against Kravtsov under Part 4 of Article 210 of the Criminal Code (theft through abuse of official powers).

On 17 September Kravtsov applied to the Investigative Committee to open an investigation into his abduction and unlawful expulsion.

Kalesnikava remained in prison until 13 December 2025, when she was released together with Viktar Babaryka among 123 political prisoners who were taken to Ukraine.

=== Razam party ===
In August 2020 Viktar Babaryka and Maria Kalesnikava announced in a video address the creation of the political party Razam and said that the team would shortly submit documents for its registration. Soon afterwards Kalesnikava and other members of Babaryka's team were arrested. Work on the party resumed at the end of March 2021, and Kravtsov joined its organising committee together with other members of the team and activists.

== Political views ==
Kravtsov advocates de-escalation in relations between the European Union and Belarus: the opening of borders, the restoration of air links and an end to repression. He is critical of sanctions policy, comparing sanctions to "chemotherapy" that "kills healthy cells along with the sick ones" and "cannot be kept up forever", and has called negotiations between the West and Lukashenko necessary since 2021. He assessed the foreign policy of the Trump administration positively.

Kravtsov is a consistent supporter of the negotiation track, above all the American one. After Siarhei Tsikhanouski and 13 other political prisoners were released on 21 June 2025 following Lukashenko's meeting in Minsk with the US special envoy Keith Kellogg, Kravtsov said that "what we had been telling the Americans and Europeans for four years in a row, since November 2021, has finally begun to happen", and called for an appeal to the US president to speak to Lukashenko about the release of all remaining political prisoners.

Kravtsov describes his positions on Russia as a matter of political competence rather than sympathy for Moscow: "The question is not about being pro-Russian, the question is about adequacy". He opposes the scenario of Russia's disintegration, considering it strategically dangerous for the region and for Belarus: in his view disintegration would lead to chaos, and the strategic goal should be change for the better in Russia. At the same time he urges the democratic forces to proceed from the assumption that Russia will remain a factor in regional politics, Belarus's main trading partner and a destination for labour migration.

Kravtsov regards the 2020 protests as a completed stage: in his words, the regime "managed to suppress the protests, clear the political field and adapt to sanctions – these are facts". He links the next chance for a transfer of power to groups of influence inside Belarus, above all business and the private sector.

In February 2026, in an interview with Radio Svaboda, Kravtsov said that the democratic forces needed to be "reformatted" and pointed to a systemic problem: the Coordination Council's lack of real levers of influence over the situation in Belarus.

== See also ==
- Viktar Babaryka
- Maxim Znak
- Coordination Council (Belarus)
