= Ivan Kulesh =

Belarusian serial killer (1986–2016)

- Kulesh c. 2015, having been sentenced to death
- Born: 1986; Soviet Union
- Died: 5 November 2016 (aged 29–30); Pishchalauski Castle, Minsk, Belarus
- Cause of death: Execution by shooting
- Status: Executed
- Conviction: Murder with aggravating circumstances
- Penalty: Death

Details
- Victims: 3
- Span of crimes: 2013–2014
- Country: Belarus
- State: Grodno
- Date apprehended: 28 November 2014

Ivan Kulesh (Belarusian: Іван Кулеш; 1986 – 5 November 2016) was a Belarusian criminal and serial killer. Between 2013 and 2014, the drunken Kulesh killed three saleswomen in two stores in the Lida District, Grodno Region, after which he stole money and goods. For his crimes, he was sentenced to death and subsequently executed.

== Early life ==
An orphan since six months of age—Kulesh's mother died shortly after his birth, and he never knew his father—Kulesh was brought up in an orphanage with his brother and sister. He graduated from the ninth grade at school, and at age 18 was convicted of theft. After his release, Ivan was engaged in temporary part-time work for his neighbours, an auto service station, and a construction site, as well as picking berries and mushrooms. Officially, he was registered in the Baranovichy District, but lived in the Lida District.

Kulesh's common-law wife described him as a man who often drank but was rarely prone to outbursts of aggression. He had explained to her his unwillingness to change his life by saying that "everyone around was also drinking." "I always wondered how could he be so calm. I could scream and shout: how much can you drink, and in response—nothing", she told reporters. According to her, Ivan spent his free time drinking beer, smoking cigarettes, playing computer games and sleeping, paying very little attention to her and their child.

== Murders ==
On the evening of 15 September 2013, two saleswomen (born in 1968 and 1957) were killed in a store on the outskirts of Lida. Around 35 to 37 million rubles (equivalent to roughly US$5,600 today) were stolen from the store, as well as alcoholic beverages. After these murders, the Lida Police Department sent out orientations to two local residents born in 1978 and 1979. Subsequently, Kulesh confessed to this double murder: according to him, he had come to Lida for City Day, got drunk, and, when he ran out of money, decided to steal something and stumbled upon the store. Finding a metal pipe nearby, he entered the then-closed store through the back door and hit the first saleswoman on the head and the second one in the sales area. Then, he returned several times and struck new blows on the victims. The stolen amount was spent in about six months: he supplied his common-law wife with money (two months after the crime, she gave birth to a daughter), but the woman denied having received more money than before. When the money ran out, he laid a laptop in a pawn shop and wrote a statement about the theft (allegedly, the laptop was stolen on a train). For the false report, he was given a fine worth 4.5 million rubles ($500). It was reported that he had been interviewed once for the case, but was too drunk to say anything.

On 28 November 2014, near the village of Selets, Kulesh, while intoxicated, struck a 44-year-old saleswoman of a local store several times with an axe, taking the keys and, according to various sources, stealing between 5 and 8 million rubles ($600–900), as well as alcoholic drinks, cigarettes, sausages, and sweets worth another 8 million rubles ($900). While leaving the store, he ran into the victim's son, who had already found the body of his mother in the woods thanks to a barking dog. Threatening him with a knife, Kulesh ran away and took a train to Baranavichy. The son of the murdered woman reported the criminal to the police and Kulesh was detained on the train at Novoelnya Station.

== Trial ==
After the arrest, Kulesh began to cooperate and confessed to the double murder in the hope of replacing the death penalty with a life sentence: "I understood that I could not get away. They said that for the jury, a confession could be a mitigating circumstance. ... Maybe in 50 years, I will see my daughter," he said at the trial. A judicial examination found that Kulesh suffered from an antisocial personality disorder, but was otherwise sane.

Kulesh was tried under several articles of the Criminal Code of Belarus – for Attempted Crime, Murder, Theft and Robbery. In the pre-trial detention centre, Kulesh visited a priest and a psychologist, and began taking antidepressants. Letters to Kulesh from his brother were heavily censored by the prison authorities. The case was handled by the Grodno Regional Court, and on 20 November 2015, the court sentenced Kulesh to death.

Kulesh's defence filed a cassation appeal to the Supreme Court of Belarus. Relatives of the convict, who had previously barely participated in the trial, questioned Kulesh's participation in the first two murders. His lawyer focused the attention of the Supreme Court on the fact that the double murder in Lida was disclosed solely on the testimony of the defendant since the police did not have fingerprints or the murder weapon. Another peculiarity of the case was that during his interrogation, Kulesh was able to describe in detail his route to southern Lida in apparently his first visit to the area and after drinking two bottles of vodka and a liter of beer, but was unable to remember whether the victims resisted. The fate of the 35–37 million rubles was also unclear—the common-law wife stated that after the double murder, Kulesh did not bring any more money home. Kulesh himself, however, agreed with the verdict, and on 29 March 2016, the Supreme Court upheld it.

On 5 November 2016, Ivan Kulesh was executed by pistol-shot, along with two other convicts. Belarus is the only European country still practising capital punishment.

== See also ==
- List of serial killers by country
