= Eduard Lykov =

Russian-born Belarusian serial killer

- Lykov in c. 2011-2014
- Born: Eduard Evgenevich Lykov; March 15, 1960; Moscow, Russian SSR
- Died: November 2014 (aged 54); Pishchalauski Castle, Minsk, Belarus
- Cause of death: Execution by shooting
- Status: Executed
- Conviction: Murder with aggravating circumstances (5 counts)
- Penalty: Death

Details
- Victims: 5
- Span of crimes: 2002–2011
- Country: Belarus
- States: Minsk, Grodno
- Date apprehended: September 2011

Eduard Evgenevich Lykov (Russian: Эдуа́рд Евгеньевич Лыќов, Belarusian: Эдуард Яўгенавіч Лыкаў; March 15, 1960 – November 2014) was a Russian-born Belarusian criminal and serial killer, responsible for five murders between 2002 and 2011. Despite concerns from human rights activists over his possible Russian citizenship, his drunken state during the murders, and his petition for clemency, Lykov was sentenced to death by the Minsk Regional Court, and subsequently executed in 2014.

== Early life ==
Little is known about Lykov's early life. He was a Muscovite, was married and had two children (a son living in Russia and a daughter living in Germany), with whom he didn't keep in contact. Lykov and his mother moved to the city of Baranavichy at an unknown time, dropping their Russian citizenship in favour of Belarusian. While living in the country, he was at various times convicted of theft, robbery, embezzlement, hooliganism and not paying his alimony. While serving time in prison, Lykov met 38-year-old Viktor Gladky, who would later become his first victim.

== Murders ==
=== Viktor Gladky and his mother ===
In October 2002, Lykov visited Gladky's house in the village of Kirsha, Minsk Region, with the latter's mother present there as well. According to Lykov, he and Viktor were talking normally when Gladky mentioned how good his life was. Soon after, a quarrel started between the two, with Lykov beating Gladky with his hands, feet, wooden logs and other objects. Gladky's mother started screaming, grabbing a knife and threatening to kill Lykov if he persisted. However, Lykov managed to get the knife away from her hands and stabbed the woman multiple times. After she died, he put her bloodied body on the sofa. While Lykov was cleaning up the crime scene, he overheard the barely-living Viktor trying to say something to him. In order to prevent being identified, Lykov grabbed an axe and hit Gladky on the head, killing him instantly.

Lykov evaded suspicion, as Viktor's drunken brother, Mikhail, believing he had committed the double murder, falsely confessed to the crime. He was sentenced to serve 8 years in prison, and was released in 2010, a year before the actual perpetrator was captured.

=== His girlfriend's former roommate ===
On June 10, 2004, while in Grodno apartment of his girlfriend's former roommate, only identified as F., Lykov began arguing with the man. Shortly after, he stabbed F. at least 11 times in the back with a knife before hitting him on the head at least 3 times with an axe. The corpse was then dismembered, and the pieces were buried in a nearby forest.

=== Kashperova ===
In that same apartment, in which the homeless Lykov lived only from time to time, on March 19, 2011, he killed his ex-girlfriend, Kashperova. Lykov hit her at least 2 times on the head with metal dumbbells, at least 2 times to the back of the neck, in the back and, in the end, tied a piece of cloth around her neck. Kashperova's body was then moved to the bathroom and hidden under a pile of clothes. Following the murder, Lykov lived in the apartment for about a week.

=== Grigorenko ===
Lykov eventually settled in the village of Zhdanovichy, in the Minsk Region, where he met a 74-year-old pensioner named Grigorenko. On September 18, 2011, the two men were in Grigorenko's yard shed, when they began quarrelling. Noticing a metal pipe on the windowsill, Lykov grabbed it and hit Grigorenko six times with it, killing him. After reassuring himself that he was dead, Lykov stole 150 rubles that were in the victim's pocket.

== Trial, sentence and death ==
After being monitored for some time, Eduard Lykov was eventually captured by the authorities. During the interrogation, he voluntarily confessed to all of his crimes (despite alleging that the policemen "helped" him by giving him alcohol), trying to explain that it was only arguing gone wrong. After changing three lawyers, Lykov, presenting himself as a "non-Christian" at the trial, pleaded for life imprisonment. However, the Minsk Regional Court was not lenient with him and sentenced him to death.

The sentence stirred up controversy, as human rights organizations aiming to abolish the death penalty in the country argued that Lykov shouldn't be executed because of his Russian citizenship. The Russian embassy in Minsk checked the claims, but no such citizenship was found. As for the convict himself, he wrote a petition for clemency to President Alexander Lukashenko, which was subsequently denied. In November 2014, Eduard Lykov was executed in Minsk.

== See also ==
- List of serial killers by country
