= Kurilsky (disambiguation) =

Kurilsky may refer to:

- Kurilsky District, a raion of Sakhalin Oblast, Russia
- Kurils Nature Reserve or Kurilsky, an ecological reserve on Kunashir Island, Russia
- Yuri Kurilsky (1979–2007), Belarusian serial killer

== See also ==
- Severo-Kurilsky District, a raion of Sakhalin Oblast, Russia
- Yuzhno-Kurilsky District, a raion of Sakhalin Oblast, Russia
