= Inga Khrushchova =

Belarusian political activist

- Born: December 18, 1970 (age 55); Polatsk
- Education: Belarusian State University
- Occupation: Journalist
- Known for: Hosting the main news show on Belarusian state TV in the 1990s

Inga Khrushchova (Russian: Инга Хрущёва; Belarusian: Інга Хрушчова; also Inha Khrushchova; born 18 December 1970 in Polatsk, Belarus) is a Belarusian journalist, media producer, documentary professional, and political activist. She is known for her long career within Belarusian state media, her ethical resignation from state television, and her subsequent public criticism of authoritarianism and propaganda in Belarus.

== Career in state media ==
From the mid-1990s, Khrushchova worked in Belarusian state media. Between 1995 and 2001, she was a daily prime-time news presenter on Belarusian Television (BT), the national broadcaster controlled by the presidential administration.

She later became part of the presidential press corps, covering the daily activities of President Alexander Lukashenko and accompanying him on official visits worldwide. Subsequently, she served as head of political coverage at the news agency of the state television and radio broadcasting company.

Independent Belarusian media described Khrushchova as one of the most visible figures of state television propaganda in the 1990s and early 2000s.

Alongside political journalism, she worked for more than two decades as a sports journalist and producer, covering eight Olympic Games.

== Departure from state television ==
In 2013, Khrushchova resigned from Belarusian state television by submitting a voluntary resignation letter. She is regarded as the only journalist from the country’s central state media who publicly explained her departure as motivated by moral and ethical reasons.

In later interviews, she stated that her decision was driven by personal responsibility and shame over participation in propaganda practices within the authoritarian system.

== Independent media work (2013–2020) ==
After leaving state television, Khrushchova worked in private business and later as an independent media producer. Between 2013 and 2020, she was the producer of the first Belarusian reality television show Bus and the first Belarusian satirical television program Vyvodы Knyrovicha.

As an independent producer, she also participated in international media industry events, including pitching new television formats at Kyiv Media Week.

== Political activity and events of 2020 ==
In the run-up to the 2020 Belarusian presidential election, Khrushchova joined the election campaign of opposition candidate Viktar Babaryka.

She signed a collective appeal by Belarusian athletes demanding free and fair elections, publicly called on employees of state media to leave propaganda structures, and took part in mass protests against the regime of Alexander Lukashenko.

In 2020, Khrushchova was the last and only journalist to film a campaign video address by presidential candidate Viktar Babaryka. Shortly after the recording, Babaryka and his son were arrested and later sentenced to long prison terms.

Following these events, Khrushchova reported being subjected to surveillance and pressure by state security services. During the same period, she continued to publicly criticize authoritarianism, state propaganda, and disinformation in Belarus.

== Emigration and later activity ==
After the suppression of mass protests in 2020, Khrushchova left Belarus and relocated to Germany, where she became involved in the activities of the Belarusian diaspora.

In 2023, in an interview with journalist Mikita Melkaziorau on the program Life Is Raspberry, she publicly articulated that the primary reason for leaving state television was shame over her work within the Lukashenko propaganda system.

== Current work ==
Khrushchova currently works on documentary and analytical projects focused on the internal mechanisms of authoritarian regimes, propaganda systems, and political complicity in Eastern Europe. Her work combines personal experience, investigative journalism, and structural analysis of power.
