= Igor Mirenkov =

Soviet-Belarusian serial killer

- Born: Igor Alexandrovich Mirenkov; 28 May 1969; Svietlahorsk, Byelorussian SSR
- Died: 19 June 1996 (aged 27); Pishchalauski Castle, Minsk, Belarus
- Cause of death: Execution by shooting
- Other name: "The Svietlahorsk Nightmare"
- Status: Executed
- Conviction: Murder with aggravating circumstances
- Penalty: Death

Details
- Victims: 6
- Span of crimes: 1990–1993
- Locations: Soviet Union, later Belarus
- Date apprehended: 27 April 1994

Igor Alexandrovich Mirenkov (28 May 1969 – 19 June 1996), known as The Svietlahorsk Nightmare, was a Soviet-Belarusian serial killer who killed six boys aged 9–13 between 1990 and 1993.

== Biography ==
Igor Mirenkov was born on 28 May 1969 in the city of Svietlahorsk in the Byelorussian SSR, where he later lived out his life and committed all his crimes. After school, Mirenkov was called to serve in the Northern Fleet, where it was reported that he solicited his male colleagues. The investigator in the Mirenkov case, Oleg Litoshko, later stated that perhaps the sailors had raped him, which later led to Mirenkov's deformed mentality.

Returning to Svietlahorsk, Mirenkov got a job and bought a JAWA-brand motorcycle and began living a normal life. Mirenkov was absolutely imperceptible. Litoshko later said this:

[...] If he was in the crowd, I wouldn't have noticed him. Absolutely inconspicuous man. But he could support the conversation. Conducted conversations on various topics...

== Murder series ==
The first murder Mirenkov committed was on 2 June 1990. His victim was a 13-year-old boy who was walking in the woods whom he attacked, raped, and killed with his knife. On 16 April 1991, he killed a 10-year-old boy under similar circumstances. At first, nobody made a connection to the killings, but Mirenkov decided to temporarily hide. For the whole of 1992, he did not commit a single murder due to being sentenced to three years of penal labour for robbery. Since Mirenkov was a model prisoner, he was often given a three-day leave, when he would commit his murders.

On 20 March 1993, Mirenkov committed a third murder, and on 30 March - a fourth. The city began to panic; the people started making claims of the "White Вrotherhood", out of fear that Romani people or criminal gangs were kidnapping the children. During the summer of 1993, Mirenkov committed a further two murders; the victims' bodies were later found in a nearby forest in autumn. Parents took to the city of Svietlahorsk, organizing pickets of the district administration, and creating self-defence committees.

== Arrest, investigation and trial ==
On 27 April 1994, Igor Mirenkov was arrested for stealing petrol and insurance fraud. He pleaded guilty and was imprisoned. On 14 May 1994, he was summoned for interrogation in the case of disappearances and murders of the children. He later confessed to six murders. The Belarusian authorities decided on unprecedented measures - the case was classified (and only declassified in 2007), and Mirenkov was put in solitary confinement in the city of Rechytsa, and investigative experiments were conducted within the framework of increased security measures for the defendant. The investigation lasted for more than a year, and after the criminal case was transferred to the Gomel Regional Court, Igor Alexandrovich Mirenkov was sentenced to death. On 19 June 1996, the verdict was carried out in the SIZO No. 1 Detention Unit in the city of Minsk.

== See also ==
- List of serial killers by country
