= Alexander Sergeychik =

Belarusian serial killer

- Born: Alexander Vasilyevich Sergeychik; 1970; Semyonovka, Byerastavitsa District, BSSR, Soviet Union
- Died: 26 November 2007 (aged 36–37); Pishchalauski Castle, Minsk, Belarus
- Cause of death: Execution by shooting
- Status: Executed
- Conviction: Murder with aggravating circumstances (6 counts)
- Penalty: Death

Details
- Victims: 6–12
- Span of crimes: 2000–2006
- Country: Belarus
- States: Grodno District, Shchuchyn District

Alexander Vasilyevich Sergeychik (Belarusian: Аляксандар Васільевіч Сяргейчык; 1970 – 26 November 2007) was a Belarusian serial killer. He committed murders between 2000 and 2006 in Shchuchyn District and Grodno District. He confessed to killing a total of twelve people; however, the investigation could bring forward only enough evidence to convict him of six murders. He received the death penalty by the court.

== Early life ==
Sergeychik was born in 1970 in Semyonovka village, Byerastavitsa District, BSSR in a large family. He had a brother and a sister. Sergeychik's father was an alcoholic who often beat his wife and children, and then completely abandoned the family for another woman. Sergeychik graduated from the Makarovskaya secondary school. Later, he attended vocational school to be a driver. From 1989 to 1991, he served in the Armed Forces of the USSR before he was demobilised in November 1991. After the demobilisation, he returned to his native village, where he worked as a driver for a local enterprise.

In March 1992, he saw an announcement about recruitment for the police, where he applied for a position. Sergeychik graduated with honours from the Ministry of the Interior Academy of the Republic of Belarus, married, and had two children. He worked as a company commander of the Grodno District Department. In the workplace, he was described as a "responsible and executive worker". At the time of his arrest, he had the rank of senior police lieutenant.

== Crimes ==
Sergeychik committed his first crime on 18 September 1992, having stolen a trailer on the collective farm "Oktyabr", after which he began to break into garages, stealing cars and other property. He stole a carbine, a Walther PP pistol and several dummy grenades. In 14 years Sergeychik stole property worth 900 thousand dollars.

He committed his first murder in April 2000, when he picked up 21-year-old Helen Boltak as a travelling companion, driving her 76 km in the Shchuchyn District forest, where he drank a bottle of alcohol prepared beforehand. They engaged in sexual intercourse, and when she lost consciousness, he strangled her, doused her with gasoline and lit her on fire after taking her jewellery and cash.

In June 2000, Sergeychik came to the apartment of his 31-year-old mistress, Svetlana Pyrskaya. According to his confession, after a quarrel with her about divorcing his wife, "in a fit of anger" and "under the influence of alcohol", he strangled her with a TV cable, then staged her suicide by hanging her in the bathroom, after which he took all the cash from the apartment that he could find.

In late July 2000 after acquainting himself with 19-year-old Lyudmila Kodik, he took her out on the pretext of checking out the Neman river, where he drank alcohol with the victim, engaged in sex with her, beat her severely, strangled her with a rope prepared in advance and dropped her body into the river. After that, Sergeychik robbed her and burglarised her apartment.

In 2001, Sergeychik assaulted several detainees arrested for drinking alcohol in public places.

His next murders were in September 2002. He committed them with an accomplice, his 18-year-old nephew Dmitry Barkov. Initially, the criminals drove a car several hours along the streets of Grodno unsuccessfully searching for a suitable victim. They drove out of town, where they saw a VAZ-2106 Zhiguli parked near the roadside. Sergeychik and Barkov, armed with Alexander's pistol, approached the car. Sergeychik knocked on the driver's door, after which he demanded that the driver, Viktor Syrytsya, hand over the keys to the car, presenting his service certificate. The driver was shot in the head through the windshield but survived. Then Sergeychik and Barkov dragged Syrytsya out of the car and beat him to death.

The passenger was Syrytsya's girlfriend Elena Turchennik. She tried to escape, but Barkov caught her, beat her and dragged her to his car. The criminals then took turns raping her, before Sergeychik strangled her with a towing cable. They robbed the victims, tied the corpses with a towing cable and left them in the car trunk.

In November 2003, Sergeychik, while on duty, beat up a detainee in the workplace and used a gas canister against him, as a result of which he had to call for an ambulance, but the case was ignored.

In February 2005, Sergeychik, in a state of intoxication, quarrelled with his wife and came to his friend's mistress Natalia Bazis. Earlier his friend (also a militia officer) and Sergeychik drank alcohol at her apartment. Several hours later. Sergeychik returned to the apartment where he beat up Bazis, then raped her, strangling her with her bra and leaving the corpse in the bathroom. He burglarised the apartment and fled the scene.

== Arrest and trial ==
After Bazis' murder, her friends were investigated including Sergeychik. By that time he had resigned from internal affairs. He was summoned for interrogation since his fingerprints were found on the fragments of a bottle that he had broken on Bazis' head. Sergeychik tried to deny any connection to the murder but began to get confused during the testimony and came under suspicion. After the police searched his apartment and garages, items stolen from Kodik's apartment were located in addition to an arsenal of weapons and other stolen property. In February 2006, the former policeman was charged with two murders and robberies for which he was imprisoned.

Soon he was charged with four more murders, based on traces of his DNA at the crime scenes. Sergeychik began to confess, admitting to the murders of eleven women and one man. In addition to the proven crimes, Sergeychik confessed to the murders of Olga Geroshchuk, Olga Shor, Elena Runets, Yulia Yatsyshina, Gulnara Azizova and Alexandra Kornat. He confessed that all of them were raped and killed, then either burned or dropped into the Neman. The bodies were never found, so the accusations of these murders were not brought against him.

Psychiatrists concluded that the serial killer was sane.

The trial of Alexander Sergeychik and Dmitry Barkov began on 20 February 2007, in a closed court. Sergeychik was accused of committing murders with "special cruelty to conceal another crime from hooligan motives", rape, and theft of property, including theft of firearms, illegal carrying, storage, transportation of firearms, ammunition, explosives and explosive devices.

On 22 May 2007, Sergeychik was found guilty of all charges, and sentenced to an exceptional penalty by the Grodno District court - death through execution with confiscation of all his property. Dmitry Barkov was sentenced to 10 years in a penal colony. The Supreme Court of the Republic of Belarus left the verdict unchanged.

On 26 November 2007, the verdict was carried out.

== Consequences for the Ministry of Internal Affairs ==
Sergeychik's arrest led to a scandal in the law enforcement bodies. On 28 October 2007, President Alexander Lukashenko signed Decree No. 540 "On incomplete service compliance". For violations of the lawfulness and inaction of this case to strict disciplinary responsibility, according to the Prosecutor General of Belarus Petr Miklashevich, "a number of employees of the Ministry of Internal Affairs and prosecutors have been recruited from the General Prosecutor's Office to the regional district levels".

As a result, the first deputy head of the Ministry of Internal Affairs RB Alexander Shchurko was warned.

Reprimands were given to the State Secretary of the Security Council Viktor Sheiman, Interior Minister Vladimir Naumov, his deputies Viktor Filistovich and Viktor Zhiburtovich, Deputy Prosecutor General Stepan Kosukha and Viktor Prus. Strict reprimands were given to the former head of the Internal Affairs Directorate of the Grodno oblast executive committee, the deputy of the House of Representatives Anatoliy Beloshevsky, the former first deputy head of the Internal Affairs Director Viktor Zherebilo, the former heads of the Grodno regional administration of the Okhrana association under MVD Vladimir Pekarsky and Ivan Zmurshchik. The former First Deputy Minister of Internal Affairs Mikhail Udovikov was deprived of his firearms.

On 31 October 2007, the prosecutor of the Grodno region Vasiliy Litvinov, his deputy Vladimir Onisko and the prosecutor of the Oktyabrsky District of the city of Grodno, Boris Taranko, were relieved from their posts.

== See also ==
- List of serial killers by country
- List of serial killers by number of victims
- Mikhail Popkov
