= Alexey Mikhalenya =

Executed Belarusian serial killer

- Born: Alexey Arkadyevich Mikhalenya; 1984; Yelʹsk District, Gomel Region, Byelorussian SSR
- Died: May 15/16, 2018; Pishchalauski Castle, Minsk, Belarus
- Cause of death: Execution by shooting
- Convictions: Murder x5 Theft
- Penalty: 12 years (2002); Death (2017)

Details
- Victims: 5
- Span of crimes: 2002–2016
- Country: Belarus
- State: Gomel
- Date apprehended: March 5, 2016

Alexey Arkadyevich Mikhalenya (Belarusian: Аляксей Аркадзьевіч Міхаленя; 1984 – May 15 or 16, 2018) was a Belarusian serial killer and criminal who killed five people in the Gomel Region from 2002 to 2016, three of the killings were committed while he was still a teenager. For his latter murders, he was sentenced to death and subsequently executed in 2018.

== Early life and first murders ==
Little is known of Mikhalenya's personal life. He was born in 1984 in the Yelʹsk District, and by the time of his latest arrest, he had not completed his secondary education and was unemployed.

At the age of 17, Mikhalenya began terrorizing the pensioners living next door by extorting them for money so he could buy alcohol. In October 2002, he and a friend of his had been drinking together when they planned to rob a pensioner for money. The pair then broke through the window of a neighbor's house and robbed him, and when the man tried to talk to Mikhalenya on the following day, he was hit with a wooden rolling pin.

A week later, Mikhalenya and his friend decided to rob the neighbors, sneaking in at night via the window. However, they woke up the husband and wife by accident, forcing them to grab a shovel and hit the man on the head. The two home invaders then beat, stomped and stabbed the victims with a welding rod before fleeing the house. They returned on the following day in order to clean up the murder scene and wash away the bloodstains before wrapping the bodies up in blankets and putting them in a wheelbarrow. Upon doing so, they pushed it to the Pripyat River, tied some ceramic drainage pipes to the bodies and then dumped them into the water.

Not long after, Mikhalenya and another accomplice were hanging around in the forested area of the Mazyr District when they came across a 67-year-old mushroom hunter by chance. They beat and robbed him on the spot, with Mikhalenya stabbing him in the neck. While the victim was still alive, the pair threw some olive branches over him and left him to die at the bottom of a ravine.

=== Arrest and investigation ===
A few days after this attack, the pair carried out a robbery in the village of Protyuki, beating up the saleswoman and stealing money from the store's cash register. This was apparently noticed by a group of hunters who fired their guns into the air, scaring the criminals off and forcing them to flee through the emergency exit, with the hunters' dogs chasing after them. Upon learning of the attack, a relative of the victim chased after them with a motorcycle, and when he got close to them, he fired his shotgun into the air. This forced Mikhalenya and his accomplice to stop and surrender, leading to them being turned over to the police.

By that time, the wounded mushroom hunter had succumbed from his injuries in hospital and relatives of the pensioners were getting worried over their apparent disappearances. Upon investigating the latter's house, two senior investigators from the regional prosecutor's office noticed some hardly visible drops of blood and collected samples for forensic tests. The results concluded that the blood originated from two individuals, a male and a female, indicating that it belonged to the missing spouses.

Upon learning this, the investigators started questioning everybody who was acquainted with them, among whom was Mikhalenya. They were eventually able to obtain confessions from both him and his two accomplices, whose testimonies were recorded on videotape. The criminals said that they had dumped the bodies in the Pripyat River, but after a team of divers searched through it, they were only able to locate a red blanket with which the victims had supposedly been wrapped up. Additional searches were later conducted in the vicinity of the Polesie State Radioecological Reserve, but no trace of the bodies was found.

Since they were unable to locate the bodies, genetic testing was done on the couple's son, with his DNA matching the testing samples. Upon closer examination, it was determined that the droplets of blood found inside the house and on several items belonged to the woman. During the course of the investigation, which lasted more than a year, investigators were able to solve up to nine unrelated serious crimes, but were still unable to locate the pensioners' bodies.

=== First trial and imprisonment ===
In 2004, the Mazyr District Court sentenced the 19-year-old accomplice to 25 years imprisonment, while Mikhalenya and the other accomplice, both of whom were underage at the time of the crimes, was each sentenced to 12 years imprisonment. A few months later, human remains were found washed ashore of the Pripyat River, with forensic tests determining that they belonged to the missing couple. Despite this, the sentence of the convicts remained unchanged.

Mikhalenya was released in the fall of 2014, but was soon convicted of theft and given a 1.5-year prison sentence. After serving it in full, he was released sometime in late February 2016, with various sources giving different dates. He then moved in to live with his father, Arkady, at the latter's house in Naroulia.

== Double murder ==
On March 4, 2016, Mikhalenya's father asked him to go to the neighbors and borrow some scissors so he could cut his hair. As the first neighbor did not have any, he then went to the apartment of 61-year-old Viktor Fateyev, a pensioner who lived with his 59-year-old sister, Raisa. At that time, Mikhalenya was intoxicated since he had spent most of the day drinking with a friend.

At his later murder trial, Mikhalenya claimed that Fateyev attacked him unprovoked, with Raisa also jumping him with a stick, but missing and hitting her brother instead. According to his version of events, Mikhalenya broke free of their grasp and attempted to calm them down, but Fateyev then stormed out of the house and headed outside, where he attempted to flag a car for help. Seemingly unwilling to deal with police due to his recent release, Mikhalenya punched him twice in the stomach and then started beating Raisa, who had attempted to flee. He then started punching, beating and stabbing them with a knife, alternating between the two victims before he finally beat Viktor to death with a stick as he attempted to crawl away.

When he noticed that Raisa was also still alive, Mikhalenya violently pushed her onto a bench, causing her to crash into the window sill and make some of the nails fall out of it. Using these nails, he then proceeded to gouge the woman's eyes out. After killing them, he dumped Raisa's body in the basement of the house and Viktor's body in the vegetable garden, before returning home and washing away the bloodstains. In total, an autopsy concluded that Mikhalenya had stabbed the victims at least 55 times (22 for Viktor and 33 for Raisa), most of which were in the head region.

=== Arrest, trial and appeals ===
On the following morning, a nephew of Raisa found her body in the basement and quickly alerted the authorities, who found her brother's body in the vegetable garden. Mikhalenya was quickly established as the perpetrator and was swiftly arrested, just as he planned to leave the city and travel to Russia to seek work.

Soon after his arrest, Mikhalenya wrote a confession and began actively cooperating with the investigators, insisting that it was an act of self-defense gone awry. This claim was disproven when authorities tested some cigarette butts found in the house, which had both Mikhalenya and Fateyev's DNA on them. According to the results, it indicated that the killer had time to smoke at least twice between the murders, indicating that it was intentional murder.

Before he was put on trial, Mikhalenya was ordered to undergo a psychiatric evaluation, which determined that he suffered from mild intellectual issues and chronic alcoholism, but was otherwise sane. The trial began on February 8, 2017, at the Gomel Regional Court in Naroulia, where Mikhalenya was charged with two counts of aggravated murder. Throughout the proceedings, he admitted his guilt only partially and was described as indifferent.

On March 17, he was found guilty on all counts and sentenced to death. In addition, he was ordered to pay a total 50,000 rubels to the victims' family members in damages. Reportedly, Mikhalenya accepted the sentence, saying that he regretted what he had done and could not explain why he had done it, adding that a life term would not be worth it. His was the first death sentence to be handed in the country in 2017.

On June 30, his appeal was presented before the Supreme Court, which included materials that showed that the convict had suffered numerous bodily injuries during the scuffle, including a smashed nose and hematomas on the neck. It alleged that the district court deliberately ignored these findings and that from the two sobriety tests he had undergone, the neutral one had been omitted from the trial. In his plea, Mikhalenya stated that he was remorseful for his crimes and would do anything he could to repay the victims' family members, asking that he be re-sentenced to life imprisonment instead.

On February 1, 2018, an individual appeal was submitted to the United Nations Human Rights Council by Mikhalenya's father, Arkady. In response to the appeal, the Council requested that the Belarusian authorities postpone the execution while the case was still pending.

== Execution ==
On May 29, 2018, another death row inmate, Vyacheslav Sukharko, reported on the apparent execution of Mikhalenya in his own appeal to the Supreme Court. According to him, he and another inmate, Viktor Lyotov, were taken away from their cells in Pishchalauski Castle on the night between May 15 and 16, and never returned.

In September 2021, the Council published its decision on the case, finding numerous violations committed during the trial. It concluded that Mikhalenya's right to life had been violated under Article 6 of the ICCPR guidelines, claiming that he had been given an unfair trial.

== See also ==
- List of serial killers by country
