= Salei =

Salei (Belarusian: Салей), also transliterated Saley and Salej, is a surname. Notable people include:

- Illia Salei (born 1991), Belarusian lawyer and political activist
- Dzmitry Salei (born 1989), Belarusian-Azerbaijani Paralympic swimmer
- Raman Salei (born 1994), Belarusian-Azerbaijani Paralympic swimmer
- Ruslan Salei (1974–2011), Belarusian ice hockey player

== See also ==
- Cupiennius salei, a species of spider
