= The Polotsk Four =

Belarusian criminals and serial killers

- Born: Polotsk, Byelorussian SSR
- Died: 2005 (Pugachev); Pishchalauski Castle, Minsk, Belarus
- Cause of death: Execution by shooting
- Other name: "The Polotsk Gang"
- Conviction: Murder with aggravating circumstances
- Penalty: Death (Pugachev); Life imprisonment (Burdenko); 18 years (Ignatovich); 13 years (Astafurov)

Details
- Victims: 4
- Span of crimes: 2001–2002
- Country: Belarus
- State: Vitebsk Region
- Date apprehended: November 13, 2003

The Polotsk Four was a group of Belarusian criminals and robbers, active from 2001 to 2002, led by serial killers Sergey Pugachev and Alexander Burdenko. With the aid of thieves Dmitry Ignatovich and Sergey Astafurov, the gang robbed numerous places around the Vitebsk Region and Brest Region, with Pugachev and Burdenko themselves killing two girls and two car enthusiasts.

Pugachev and Burdenko would later be convicted of the murders, with the former being sentenced to death and executed, while the latter received a life sentence. Ignatovich and Astafurov received lesser sentences, and have since been released.

== Members ==
- Sergey Pugachev (b. 1972) - a former entrepreneur, noted for once selling pantyhose on the market.
- Alexander Burdenko (b. 1974) - originally attended the same school in Polotsk along with Ignatovich, Burdenko entered the Yaroslavl Higher Military Financial School, where he was later kicked out of for lack of discipline. While living in Russia, he had received a suspended sentence for robbery. According to sources, his favorite type of item to steal is gold.
- Dmitry "Dimka" Ignatovich (b. 1974) - originally attended the same school in Polotsk along with Burdenko, Ignatovich was sent to a prison colony for theft, from which he later escaped, hurting an officer in the process. He managed to become a proficient thief afterwards.
- Sergey Astafurov (b. 1970) - described as an "authoritative" thief by his fellow gang members, Astafurov, despite being a big talker and heavy drinker, had the ability to deal with any kind of alarm.

It is also noted that one member of the gang practised occultism in order to bring them luck, much to the amusement of his co-conspirators. However, it is unclear who that member is.

== Formation ==
The thirst for profit between the former school buddies would eventually make them cross paths again, with Ignatovich borrowing $200 from Burdenko, giving him a Makarov pistol as deposit. Later on, Burdenko introduced Ignatovich to Pugachev, and in turn, the former let Astafurov into the gang.

== Crimes ==
In the span of three years, the gang would rob a large number of facilities, assault multiple victims, steal money and engage in banditry. The following crimes are their most notable:

=== 2001 ===
- Ignatovich and Astafurov stole an office safe from an entrepreneur, containing $250–300. However, one of them was scared off by the watchman.
- During the summer months, Pugachev and Burdenko, under the influence of alcohol, lured two girls on separate occasions into their Volvo with the aim of stealing their gold jewelry. The first victim, 24-year-old Valentina Balchugina, had her head smashed in with an iron pipe. The other victim, 20-year-old Poland-based dancer Sveta Golovach, an acquaintance of the criminals, was strangled with a belt. The gold was then shared between the two.

=== 2002 ===
- Pugachev and Burdenko would regularly travel from Polotsk to the Lepiel-Polotsk Highway, bordering with the Russian town of Opochka. They would install spikes on the road, camouflage themselves and their guns, binoculars and radios, and wait for victims. On the night of April 21, 2002, they were unlucky, and drove home in a bad mood. While passing through the village of Kolektivniyi, the duo noticed a lone Mitsubishi Galant along the road. The car belonged to Russian car enthusiast Nikolay Petrachkov, from Slantsy, who had lost contact with his friends near the village of Kingisepp. Burdenko shot the sleeping Petrachkov through the glass, and at Pugachev's request, finished him off with a headshot. The victim's money and cellphone were taken, and his blood-soaked Galant was burned in a forest in the Rossony District.
- A few months later, a similar event was repeated, when Pugachev shot and killed another car enthusiast from Slantsy named Georgy Romanov. His corpse was also buried in the forest, with his Volkswagen Passat also being burned.

=== Spring 2002 to November 2003 ===
- Several raids were carried out by the quartet on companies, enterprises, apartments and villas of wealthy people in the Vitebsk Region and Brest Region, with the loot amounting to around 130 million rubles. The criminals stole computer equipment, car batteries, washing machines, gas stoves and gold jewelry, all of which would be sold in their native Polotsk.

=== 2003 ===
- The quartet prepared for at least a week to kidnap the Novopolotsk-based Kovalevich family, who were currency traders, for a ransom worth $30,000. Burdenko was tasked with watching the victims. On June 26, 2003, in broad daylight, he informed his accomplices that the spouses were entering the apartment. When they exited the elevator, the husband and wife were shot with the Makarov and an improvised revolver. Although severely injured, Mr. Kovalevich managed to fight off the criminals with a fishing pole, while his wife hanged back with a bullet in her stomach. The elevator doors then miraculously closed, with the spouses managing to crawl out in the street and call for help. They were later transported to a hospital and saved by the doctors. However, the gang had escaped through a pre-planned route: through the roof.

=== Undated ===
- Among their numerous robberies, another notable attack on a family was done by the gang. Three of them had tried to break into the dacha of Ivan Stepanovich N., with his wife and 3-year-old child present, all camouflaged, carrying batons and handcuffs. Although Ivan was beaten up and his arm broken, his wife managed to close the door in the attackers' faces before calling the police. Because of this, the criminals were scared off and ran away.

== Discovery and capture ==
On September 11, 2002, the decomposing body of an unidentified man was found by forester Alexander Zholudev. The victim had a bullet from a Makarov lodged into his head. Although some detectives had the feeling this would quickly become a cold case, inspector Yevgeny Gulyaev, who was recently on a business trip to Slantsy, noticed a group of drivers along the road. When one of their cars broke down, he asked them if any of their colleagues had gone missing, with one replying that somebody indeed had: Georgy Romanov. The corpse found in the forest was quickly identified as that of Romanov by the traffic police, but soon after, another body was discovered along the same road. The authorities, who had learned that Petrachkov had also gone missing in the area, connected the dots when a bullet was also found in the head of this body as well. Both killings pointed towards a gang operating in the area.

Later on, another forester by the name of Alexander Sergeevich recalled that several months earlier, he had seen a strange man loitering around the burial site at 5 o'clock in the morning. When they approached the man, he quickly entered his car and sped away.

The criminals were eventually captured when the cellphone belonging to Petrachkov, which Burdenko registered in his name, was traced and monitored by the police. After a month of close observation, the operatives moved in to arrest the criminals on November 13, 2003. Just a few days before, one of the gang members, Astafurov, sensed that there was some kind of ambush awaiting him in his home, and so he hid in a box storing potatoes. Trembling with fear, he spent two days in there before being discovered and arrested. However, Burdenko remained the only one uncaptured, with policemen only confiscating some of his items for examination. To the authorities' surprise, however, Burdenko himself later appeared in the police department, demanding that they return the things seized during the search. He was arrested on the spot, and other evidence was discovered in his apartment: $4,000, an investigator's handbook for investigating banditry, a book about Russian pistols, a radio, handcuffs and a cache of Makarovs. Quickly realising that they had been watched, the gang confessed to all of their crimes.

== Trial and sentences ==
When charged, the other members rallied behind their leader Burdenko, accusing the police of beating them into confessing. Meanwhile, Balchugina's mother, driven to despair by the fact that the criminals never revealed where her daughter's corpse was hidden, believed that she was still only kidnapped, and set out to Moscow to look for her. As for the gang, after five hours of deliberation, Justice Leonid Petrov handed out the following verdicts:

- Sergey Pugachev - sentenced to death and subsequently executed in 2005.
- Alexander Burdenko - sentenced to life imprisonment in a special regime colony.
- Dmitry Ignatovich - sentenced to 18 years imprisonment in a reinforced regime colony.
- Sergey Astafurov - sentenced to 13 years imprisonment in a reinforced regime colony.
