= Gennady Mikhasevich =

Soviet serial killer

- Mugshot of Mikhasevich
- Born: Gennady Modestovich Mikhasevich; 7 April 1947; Ist, Vitebsk Oblast, Byelorussian SSR
- Died: 25 September 1987 (aged 40); Pishchalauski Castle, Minsk, Byelorussian SSR
- Cause of death: Execution by shooting
- Other name: Vitebsk Strangler
- Conviction: Murder with aggravating circumstances (x36)
- Penalty: Death

Details
- Victims: 36 confirmed 43 confessed 55+ estimated
- Span of crimes: May 1971 – December 1985
- Country: Soviet Union
- State: Vitebsk
- Date apprehended: 9 December 1985

Gennady Modestovich Mikhasevich (Belarusian: Генадзь Мадэставіч Міхасевіч; 7 April 1947 – 25 September 1987) was a Soviet serial killer and serial rapist known as the "Vitebsk Strangler" (Віцебскі душыцель), who murdered a minimum of 36 women in Vitebsk, Polotsk and the surrounding regions in the Byelorussian SSR between 1971 and 1985.

== Personal life ==
Gennady Mikhasevich was born in the village of Ist (Vitebsk Oblast) in 1947. In outward appearance, Mikhasevich was a good family man, a teetotaller with two children and was a conscientious worker; he was also a member and local functionary of both the Communist Party and of the Voluntary People's Druzhina, and served in the Soviet Army. Mikhasevich later explained that his killing spree started after he had returned from his military service to find out that his girlfriend had left him and married another man.

== Murders ==
On the night of 14 May 1971, he was on his way from Vitebsk to Polotsk. It was late so he could not catch a bus to Polotsk where his parents lived. Mikhasevich reported that he was feeling despondent because of the breakup with his girlfriend, and had prepared a loop to hang himself. By chance, however, he encountered a young woman on the road and, in order to vent his anger, decided to kill her. He murdered again in October 1971, and strangled two other women in 1972, near Vitebsk. Mikhasevich graduated from a technical school in Vitebsk in 1973 and returned to Ist, starting work in a sovkhoz. He got married in 1976. In the meantime, the murders continued.

Many of his murders were committed to facilitate rape. He invariably strangled or smothered his victims, either assaulting them in solitary locations or, during later years, after having lured them into his own red Zaporozhets or the cars at his workplace (he later had a job in a repair garage). Mikhasevich did not carry weapons, choosing instead to use a variety of improvised means, including in one case, a cord made of rye. Besides killing, he robbed his victims of money and valuable items, some of which he would later present to his wife as gifts. He would also take mundane household items, like scissors.

The investigation started to advance in the 1980s, as the young investigator Nikolay Ignatovich firmly believed that all the killings of females near motorways in the region were not separate, isolated cases as previous investigators had conveniently believed, but had been committed by one person, a serial killer. The police also suspected that the serial killer was using a red Zaporozhets; as they started checking all the people of the Oblast who possessed such a car, Mikhasevich, as a druzhinnik, participated in these actions; essentially, searching for himself. This also gave him insight into the investigation itself, enabling him to learn of the steps investigators were taking beforehand, and allowing Mikhasevich to plan his own steps to avoid them. The year 1984 was especially 'prolific' for the murderer: he killed 12 women in this year alone.

Eventually, Mikhasevich, who was now getting concerned, made a fatal mistake. In order to derail the investigation, he sent an anonymous letter to the local newspaper on behalf of an imaginary underground organization, 'Patriots of Vitebsk', purportedly calling on his fellow militants to intensify their struggle of killing communists and lewd women. When he left a similar hand-written note next to his new victim, again signed on behalf of 'Patriots of Vitebsk', the investigators started to ascertain the handwriting of the male residents of the Oblast. Having checked 556,000 samples, the experts detected that the sample with the handwriting of Gennady Modestovich Mikhasevich bore a striking resemblance to the handwriting on the murderer's notes. Further investigation revealed other evidence, convincing them of Mikhasevich's guilt.

== Arrest and execution ==
Mikhasevich during an interview

On 8 December, a decision was made to detain Mikhasevich, but when investigators arrived at his home that evening he was not there. On 9 December, they learned at his workplace that he had taken vacation time and was "planning to go on holiday with his family." That same evening, Mikhasevich was arrested at his brother-in-law's house. He had packed luggage for the entire family and was carrying four plane tickets to Odessa. A search of his home revealed possessions belonging to murdered women. Psychiatrists found him sane and he was diagnosed with psychopathy. After initial denial, he confessed and was sentenced to death and executed by firing squad in 1987. His case became notorious in the USSR (“The Vitebsk Case”, “Витебское дело”), as it revealed how corrupt investigators had tried to close cases quickly: by the time Mikhasevich was finally arrested, 14 people had already been convicted for the crimes Mikhasevich committed, and a couple of them had been sentenced to death and executed for crimes they did not commit.

== See also ==
- List of serial killers by country
- List of serial killers by number of victims
