= Yuri Kurilsky =

Еxecuted Belarusian serial killer (1978/79-2007)

- Born: 1978/1979; Novopolotsk, Byelorussian SSR
- Died: 2007 (aged 28-29); Pishchalauski Castle, Minsk, Belarus
- Cause of death: Execution by shooting
- Other name: "The Monster with the Black Volga"
- Status: Executed
- Conviction: Murder with aggravating circumstances (3 counts)
- Penalty: Death

Details
- Victims: 3
- Span of crimes: 2004–2005
- Country: Belarus
- State: Vitebsk
- Date apprehended: 2006

Yuri Kurilsky (Belarusian: Юры Курыльскі; 1978/1979 – 2007), known as The Monster with the Black Volga (Belarusian: Монстар з чорнай волгай) was a Belarusian serial killer who killed three women and girls around the Vitebsk Region from 2004 to 2005. He was convicted, sentenced to death and subsequently executed for these crimes in 2007.

== Biography ==
Little is known of Kurilsky's personal life. Born in Novopolotsk, by the time of the crimes he was married and worked as an operator at the Naftan Oil Refinery. While he was a respected citizen, locals noted that he was easily angered and very aggressive when provoked.

From 2004 to 2005, Kurilsky would cruise around the Vitebsk Region in his black Volga and would pick up any victims he found suitable to satisfy his sexual demands. The first victim was a 23-year-old resident of Novopolotsk, whom, after he had sex with her, Kurilsky beat to death with a tire iron and then threw her body into the Usvyacha river. At first, this murder was considered an isolated incident, but almost a year later, two more bodies were pulled out of the river, bearing similar injuries to the first one.

The first victim was determined to be a 16-year-old schoolgirl from Gvozdovo, who had been strangled, while the other was a prostitute from Polotsk whose throat had been cut. The latter murders were determined to have been committed just a month apart, and DNA evidence revealed that all three victims had engaged in sexual intercourse with the same man.

After interviewing witnesses, authorities determined that all three victims were seen entering a Soviet-era black Volga, a vehicle which was uncommon to the area. This enabled them to check every vehicle matching the description, eventually leading them to Kurilsky. Upon inspecting his apartment and car, police found a knife with bloodstains from one of the victims, as well as bloodstains from yet another in the back of his car. In the subsequent interrogations, he readily admitted his guilt, but was unable to provide an adequate explanation for why he carried out his murders. Allegedly, it was later written in the court verdict that the murders were motivated by "the sudden arisal of a hostile relationship".

A psychiatric examination ruled that Kurilsky was sane and eligible to stand trial. During the trial, he again reiterated that he was guilty and asked for forgiveness from the victims' families. Subsequently, he was found guilty and sentenced to death. Upon hearing the verdict, Kurilsky simply smiled. After presumably refusing to appeal his conviction, Kurilsky was shot in the execution chamber of Pishchalauski Castle in Minsk in 2007, though the exact date remains unknown.

== See also ==
- List of serial killers by country
