= Valery Nekhaev =

Executed Soviet murderer

Valery Konstantinovich Nekhaev (Russian: Вале́рий Константи́нович Неха́ев; Belarusian: Валерый Канстанцінавіч Няхаеў; 1948 – 1983), known as The Minsk Poisoner (Russian: Минский отравитель), was a Soviet murderer who, together with his brother Alexander, poisoned several colleagues in Minsk from June to July 1982, killing three of them. For his crimes, Nekhaev was sentenced to death and subsequently executed.

== Biography ==
Valery Konstantinovich Nekhaev was born in 1948 in Minsk, Byelorussian SSR, the older of two sons. His family was dysfunctional, as his father died early on and his mother took no care in raising her children. Despite this, both brothers were allowed to enter higher education, but Valery later dropped out and went to work at the National Opera and Ballet, where he was described as a very reserved, yet easily offended individual.

On the night of June 26, 1982, 27-year-old Sergey Kucherov, a stage engineer at the Janka Kupala National Theatre, died at the 5th Clinical Hospital. The man's death was considered very odd, as an autopsy proved that he had succumbed to thallium poisoning, which had been mixed in with some wine. It soon became clear that Kucherov had complained of similar symptoms some time before, with another colleague of his, stage engineer Igor Lobanov, having the same issues. In that case, both men were driven to the hospital on a stretcher, as they had trouble walking by themselves. While undergoing treatment, they both reported that they suspected a man by the name of Vladimir Mezentsev, who had brought them a bottle of Sovetskoye Shampanskoye, which they both drank.

The very next day, two 26-year-old graduates of the Minsk Civil Engineering Institute, Georgy Laptev and Vladimir Rybakov, were admitted to a hospital in Minsk. When questioned as to what had happened, they claimed that they were celebrating their graduation, and one of the girls at the party invited them to drink some rare Saperavi wine. As it turned out, two bottles of this wine were found by the girl's mother at the door of Mezentsev's apartment. Soon after this, both Laptev and Rybakov succumbed to the poisoning. In early July 1982, three more men (Viktor Babashkin, Igor Zanchuk and Oleg Skripachev) were admitted to the Minsk hospital, suffering from similar symptomps, and on the morning after their admission, all three victims' hair began to fall out. Investigations revealed that they had been poisoned with a bottle of "Duchess" wine given to them by Mezentsev. While all three survived, Skripachev received severe complications from the poisoning and committed suicide a few years later. Due to the mounting suspicions against him, Mezentsev was arrested and brought in for interrogation, but to the surprise of the investigators, he told them that all of the bottles were given to him by Alexander Nekhaev, a chemist who graduated from the Belarusian State University's Chemistry Faculty.

Soon after, Alexander was arrested by Minsk police while returning from a drugstore. His brother, Valery, was also detained. Upon inspecting their apartment, authorities found a chemical warehouse with hundreds of chemical agents, including ones thallium, the poison used in the killings. Shortly after his arrest, Valery Nekhaev admitted responsibility for the murders, claiming that he had tried to frame Mezentsev because he had dropped some scenery on him and refused to apologize. After a quick trial, both brothers were found guilty: Valery was convicted on three counts of murder, sentenced to death and subsequently shot the following year. His brother, Alexander, was only convicted as an accomplice, and was given 5 years imprisonment.

The case caused a great outcry and an audit into how such poisonous substances were handled. After his release, Alexander Nekhaev was ordered to pay 1.368 rubles in damages to the state, none of which went to the victims and their families, as the Nekhaves were unable to afford paying them.

== In popular culture ==
Three documentaries were made on the case:

- "Hell's Potion", from the documentary series The Investigation was conducted... (in Russian)
- "Poisoners", from the documentary series Legends of the Soviet Detective (in Russian)
- "The Minsk Poisoner", from the documentary series No Statute of Limitations (in Russian)
