= Capital punishment in Belarus =

Europe holds the greatest concentration of abolitionist states (blue). Map current as of 2021 Abolished for all offences Retains death penalty Legal form of punishment but has had a moratorium for at least ten years

Belarus is the only country in Europe that uses capital punishment. As of 2025, it remains a legal penalty, with at least one execution confirmed and a death sentence issued, both in 2024. The death penalty has remained part of Belarusian law since independence from the Soviet Union in 1991.

The constitution permits the death penalty for "especially grave crimes". The list of capital offenses was expanded in 2023 to include high treason.

In a 1996 referendum, 80% of Belarusians voted to keep the punishment, and the Belarusian government says that this can be overturned only via another vote. The use of the death penalty and its methods were criticized by the United Nations. It is one of the reasons Belarus is excluded from the Council of Europe.

== History ==
The Belarusian Democratic Republic, as the first Belarusian state, was too short-lived to establish a codified legal system.

=== Belarusian SSR ===
Until 1928, Belarus used the Russian legal code. Its own 1928 criminal code introduced the death penalty for 38 crimes and described it as a temporary measure. Of these 38 offenses, only two were crimes against individuals: armed robbery and murder by a serviceman. Pregnant women and individuals under 18 were exempt from the punishment. A 1935 decree, effective until 1959, lowered the age limit for execution to 12.

During the Great Purge, between 1935 and 1940, over 35,000 people were executed, including 370 members of the literary intelligentsia. An estimated 10,000 to 15,000 were executed by the NKVD in prisons located in territories annexed after 1939.

In 1947, capital punishment was abolished, and was reintroduced in 1950 for spies and traitors, and then in 1954 for aggravated murder. In 1962, the death penalty was extended to bribery, and in 1965, the Presidium allowed its retroactive application to war criminals. Later, the list of capital offenses was expanded to include crimes such as currency speculation.

A 1987 case involved an individual sentenced to death who was subsequently acquitted after spending nearly 15 years in prison. During the investigation of serial killer Gennady Mikhasevich, an innocent man was wrongfully convicted and executed.

=== Republic of Belarus ===
After becoming independent, Belarus began to limit the use of the death penalty. In 1993, the list of capital crimes was reduced by eliminating economic crimes. Exemptions from the death penalty were introduced for women by 1994, followed by individuals over 65 in 2001. In 1997, life imprisonment was introduced as an alternative form of punishment. However, a presidential decree in the same year expanded the list of capital offenses to include terrorism.

A new criminal code adopted in 1999 reduced the number of capital crimes from 29 to 14. In October 2005, the parliament adopted an amendment to the Criminal Code declaring that the use of the death penalty was on a temporary basis only.

Lukashenko put forth the idea of another death penalty referendum in 2021. In December 2022, the parliament passed legislation that punishes high treason among officials and military personnel with the death penalty. Lukashenko signed this bill into law in March 2023.

== Legislation ==
Article 24 of the Constitution of Belarus states that:

Until its abolition, the death sentence may be applied in accordance with the law as an exceptional penalty for especially grave crimes and only in accordance with the verdict of a court of law.

As per the Criminal Code of the Republic of Belarus, capital punishment can be imposed for the following acts:

- War crimes
- Terrorism
- Crimes against humanity
- Aggravated murder
- Treason by an official or serviceman
- Sabotage by an organised group, or causing death or other severe consequences

Capital punishment may be imposed for preparation or attempted terrorism, but not for other crimes.

Capital punishment cannot be imposed on individuals under 18 years of age, those over 65, or on women. When a mental disorder is diagnosed that deprives the condemned person of the ability to understand their actions, the death penalty is not executed.

The death penalty is not applied if a pre-trial cooperation agreement is reached. The Prosecutor General must review petitions for these agreements.

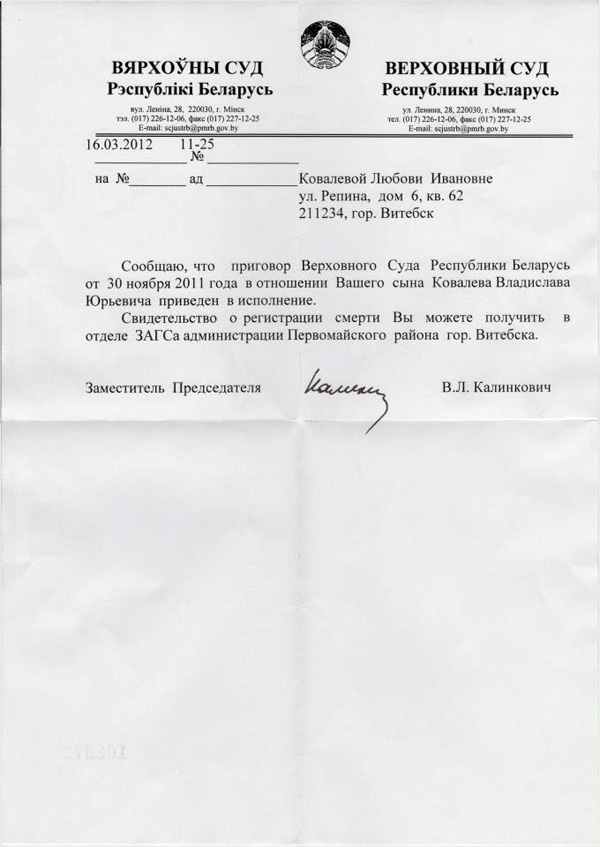
This letter was sent in 2012 to the mother of one of the perpetrators of the 2011 Minsk Metro bombing to notify her that her son had been executed.

Should the statute of limitations for the crime of a person sentenced to death expire, the court shall review the case. If the court does not find grounds to acquit the individual, the death penalty shall be commuted to imprisonment.

Death penalty criminal cases are presided over at first instance by a panel of one judge and two people's assessors, chosen from the general population. The death penalty can only be imposed on a defendant found guilty by a unanimous decision of all judges.

Executions are carried out non-publicly by shooting. Each condemned person is executed separately.

A prosecutor, a representative of the correctional facility, and a medical professional must be present at the execution. The medical professional confirms the death of the condemned.

After an execution, the facility administration notifies the sentencing court, which informs one of the deceased's close relatives. The body is not released for burial, and the burial place is not disclosed, a practice the UNHRC believes violates Article 7 of the International Covenant on Civil and Political Rights, and which the OSCE considers a violation of the Copenhagen Declaration, to both of which Belarus is a signatory.

The president may commute a death sentence to life imprisonment.

In 2004, the Constitutional Court of Belarus ruled that the President or the National Assembly could suspend or abolish the death penalty without a new referendum. This interpretation was supported in 2010 by the Court's Head and is also shared by the Council of Europe.

== Procedure ==
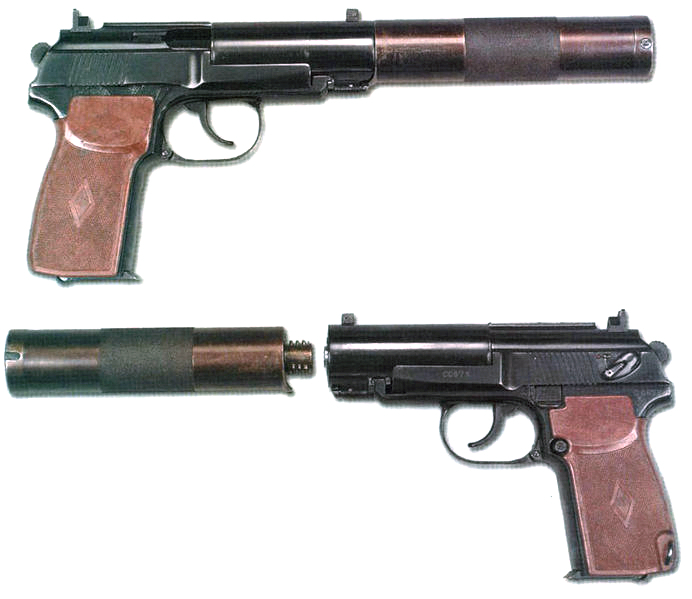
A PB pistol, used for executions in Belarus

In Belarus, prisoners sentenced to death are transferred to Minsk Detention Center No. 1 in the capital.

The execution is carried out by a member of the "committee for the execution of sentences," which also determines the execution site. According to Oleg Alkayev's book The Death Squad, on the day of execution the convict is transported to a secret location and informed that all appeals have been rejected. He is then blindfolded and taken to a nearby room. There two staffers force him to kneel in front of a bullet backstop. The executioner then shoots the convict in the back of his head with a PB-9 pistol equipped with a suppressor. Alkayev states that "The whole procedure, starting with the announcement about denied appeals and ending with the gunshot, lasts no longer than two minutes."

Following the execution, a prison doctor and other officials certify the death, and a death certificate is prepared. The remains of the executed are buried secretly, and the family is subsequently notified.

== Statistics ==
Official data on the statistics of death penalty application in Belarus is a state secret. Information is compiled and made public by human rights groups, such as Amnesty International and Viasna. These organizations gather their data through occasional government disclosures, case-by-case analysis of public media reports, and information received directly from the relatives of executed individuals. The number of executions actually carried out are particularly difficult to obtain.

For the Belarusian SSR, data on death sentences is available starting from 1985.

Death sentences in Belarusian SSR
1985	1986	1987	1988	1989	1990
21	10	12	12	5	20

For independent Belarus, multiple estimates exist regarding the number of death sentences.

Death sentences in Belarus (Note: This table primarily compiles data from the Belarusian human rights organization Viasna. Figures for 1991–2013 are drawn from their site and are almost fully corroborated by another report citing Ministry of Justice data. The data for 2011 differs between these two reports; the figure from the report citing MoJ data is preferred as it aligns with the total presented by Amnesty International. For 2014 onwards, data is based on manual analysis of Viasna's list of death penalty cases. Alternative estimates from various sources present slightly different figures. For example, BelaPAN reported 278 executions between 1992 and 2010, and later a total of 406 death sentences from Belarus's independence up to 2016. Amnesty International estimated 245 sentences between 1994 and 2014 based on Ministry of Justice data (compared to Viasna's 244 for the same period), and provided higher annual estimates for the 1990s (e.g., 40 in 1994, 46 in 1995, 53 in 1994, 46 in 1996, 55 in 1997, 84 in 1998) and for 2003 (5) and 2004 (5) It is important to distinguish between death sentences issued and executions carried out; the latter typically occur later than sentencing and may involve individuals from previous years. For instance, in 2018, 4 executions took place while only 2 new sentences were imposed. Oleg Alkayev, a former director of SIZO No. 1, said that 134 executions took place at the prison between December 1996 and May 2001, when he left Belarus to live in exile in Berlin, Germany.)
1991	1992	1993	1994	1995	1996	1997	1998	1999	2000	2001	2002
21	24	20	24	37	29	46	47	13	4	7	4
2003	2004	2005	2006	2007	2008	2009	2010	2011	2012	2013	2014
4	2	2	9	4	2	2	2	3	0	4	0
2015	2016	2017	2018	2019	2020	2021	2022	2023	2024		
2	4	4	2	3	3	0	0	1	1		

The Supreme Court rejected a death row inmate's appeal in January 2024. He was executed that October.

Death sentences can be commuted either by a decision from a higher court or through a Presidential pardon; both methods are rarely utilized. In 2012, President Lukashenko said he had pardoned only one man during his entire presidency up to that point. (Note: According to a report by the Belarusian Embassy in the UK in 2006, President Lukashenko pardoned two individuals between June 30, 2003, and June 30, 2005) Since then, there are three other known cases of pardons, including Rico Krieger as part of the 2024 Ankara prisoner exchange. There have been instances where prosecutors successfully petitioned for a reconsideration of a case, resulting in the imposition of a death sentence.

Typically, there is roughly a one-year gap between the issuance of a death sentence and its execution. The overwhelming majority of individuals executed are convicted of murder. However, those responsible for the 2011 Minsk Metro bombing and Rico Krieger in 2024 were sentenced for terrorism.

== Public opinion ==
In a 1996 referendum one of the seven questions addressed the abolition of the death penalty. The results showed that 80.44% of Belarusians opposed its abolition.

In 2000, 65% of Belarusians supported capital punishment. By 2010, support for retaining it was 48.2%, with 39.2% favoring abolition. (Note: A poll from the same year by a think tank affiliated with the President of Belarus showed 79.5% support for the death penalty and only 4.5% favoring abolition.) In 2013, 46% of Belarusians supported the death penalty, while 44% advocated for its gradual abolition. A 2017 poll conducted by a think tank associated with Lukashenko reported 60% support for the death penalty. Of those polled, 31% supported abolition, which included 18% who favored complete abolition. Support continued into 2020, with 63% of Belarusians backing the death penalty. In 2021, the Head of the Sociology Institute of NASB claimed on state TV that only 7% of the population supported its abolition.

== International reactions ==
Condemns in the strongest possible terms the executions in Belarus and deplores the fact that Belarus is currently the only country in Europe where the death penalty... is regularly and widely enforced.

— Parliamentary Assembly of the Council of Europe, 26 January 2000

The Council of Europe urged Belarus to implement a moratorium on the death penalty as a prerequisite for its membership. This position dates back to at least 2001, when European Council suggested that Belarus abolish capital punishment before seeking Council membership. Belarus's continued non-compliance led to the suspension of high-level contacts between Belarus and the PACE in 2010. The EU has similarly and repeatedly endorsed a moratorium.

In 2022, the UNHRC condemned Belarus for executing a person whose case was under Committee consideration, a breach of the Optional Protocol, which Belarus had accepted in 1992. (Note: Belarus denounced the Optional Protocol in late 2022.) Since 2007, Belarus has abstained from biennial UN General Assembly votes on a death penalty moratorium.

In 2023, U.S. Secretary of State Antony Blinken criticized Belarus's expanded death penalty scope, fearing its use to intimidate political opposition.

The UK Foreign Office criticized Belarus's use of the death penalty after the 2011 Minsk bombings' perpetrators were executed. In 2018, the German Foreign Office also called for an immediate moratorium.

In 2012, Russian Foreign Minister Sergey Lavrov said that the decision on capital punishment was a sovereign matter for each state. He acknowledged that Belarus's eventual accession to the Council of Europe, which would require abolishing the death penalty, was in Russia's interest.

In 2019, then-Foreign Minister Vladimir Makei said that public sentiment in Belarus favored capital punishment, but the government was working toward changing that. In 2022, after the Council of Europe suspended cooperation, Belarus's MFA claimed this jeopardized constructive dialogue on the death penalty. President Lukashenko, in 2013, called the death penalty "not good" but "necessary in some cases." In 2018, he contrasted European concerns with the lack of such conditions from Russia and China.
