= Illia Salei =

Belarusian lawyer and pro-democracy activist

- Ілля Салей
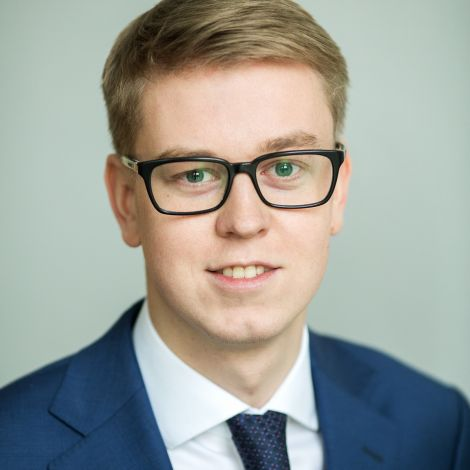
- Born: August 30, 1991 (age 35); Roslavl, RSFSR, USSR
- Citizenship: Belarusian
- Education: Belarusian State University, Duke University
- Occupation: Lawyer

Illia Salei (Belarusian: Ілля Салей, born 30 August 1991) is a Belarusian lawyer and pro-democracy activist, member of Viktar Babaryka's team and presidential campaign office at time of the 2020 Belarusian presidential election. Attorney of presidential candidates Viktar Babaryka and Sviatlana Tsikhanouskaya, as well as an opposition leader and a member of the presidium of the Coordination Council of Belarus Maria Kalesnikava. Former political prisoner and prisoner of conscience recognised by Amnesty International.

== Education ==
Graduated from Belarusian State University Faculty of Law in 2013 with highest honors. Obtained his Master of Laws from Duke University School of Law in 2014.

== Legal career ==
After graduation, Salei gained practical training at Marks & Sokolov LLC, an American-Russian international boutique firm in Philadelphia and at the international arbitration teams of Wilmer Cutler Pickering Hale and Dorr LLP in London, UK and Freshfields Bruckhaus Deringer LLP in Dubai, UAE.

Most of his legal career Salei spent as an associate / advocate at Borovtsov & Salei, an internationally recognized Belarusian law firm.

In 2022, Salei joined the Office of the General Counsel at the European Bank for Reconstruction and Development in London, UK.

== 2020 Belarusian presidential election ==
Lawyer and one of the managers of Viktar Babaryka's 2020 presidential campaign office in Belarus.

As a lawyer, provided full legal support to the campaign team of democratic presidential candidates Viktar Babaryka and Sviatlana Tsikhanouskaya at time of the 2020 Belarusian presidential election, as well as to an opposition leader, one of the members of the presidium of the Coordination Council of Belarus Maria Kalesnikava.

Together with Maxim Znak, Salei acting on behalf of Sviatlana Tsikhanouskaya appealed the results of the 2020 Belarusian presidential election to the Supreme Court of Belarus.

== Arrest and detention ==
On 9 September 2020, Salei was detained by KGB and the Main Directorate for Combating Organized Crime of the Ministry of Internal Affairs of Belarus. He was arrested and charged with threatening the national security of Belarus.

Coalition of Belarusian human rights organizations headed by Viasna Human Rights Centre and Belarusian Helsinki Committee recognized Salei as a political prisoner. Amnesty International deemed Salei a prisoner of conscience.

Law Society of England and Wales and American Bar Association wrote official letters to Alexander Lukashenko and Belarusian authorities demanding immediate release of Illia Salei. Duke Community Members issued a public statement in connection with the arrest calling for release of Illia Salei.

On 16 October 2020, Salei was released from Minsk Pre-Trial Detention Centre No.1 and placed under house arrest. On 16 April 2021, he was released on bail but remained under prosecution.

On 13 August 2021, Salei announced that he had temporary left Belarus for Poland.

== Meeting with Alexander Lukashenko ==
On 10 October 2020, Illia Salei was one of the participants of Alexander Lukashenko's meeting with Belarusian opposition leaders in the KGB Pre-Trial Detention Centre in Minsk.
