= Maria Kalesnikava =

Belarusian musician and activist (born 1982)

- Марыя Калеснікава; Мария Колесникова
- Kalesnikava in 2026
- Born: 24 April 1982 (age 44); Minsk, Byelorussian SSR, Soviet Union (now Minsk, Belarus)
- Education: Belarusian State Academy of Music; State University of Music and Performing Arts Stuttgart
- Occupations: Flutist; political activist; conductor; music teacher

Maria Kalesnikava (Note: This is the name she chose to be identified with, using the Russian form of her first name (Maria) and the Belarusian form of her surname (Kalesnikava). It is unknown whether she prefers the Russian (Aleksandrovna) or Belarusian patronymic (Alyaksandrauna).) (Marya Alyaksandrauna Kalesnikava (Note: Belarusian: Марыя Аляксандраўна Калеснікава, IPA: [maˈrɨja alʲakˈsandrawna kaˈlʲɛsʲnʲikava]; also romanized as Maryja Alaksandraŭna Kalesnikava using the Belarusian Latin alphabet.) / Maria Aleksandrovna Kolesnikova; (Note: Russian: Мария Александровна Колесникова, IPA: [mɐˈrʲijə ɐlʲɪkˈsandrəvnə kɐˈlʲesʲnʲɪkəvə].) born 24 April 1982) is a Belarusian professional flutist and political activist. In 2020, she headed Viktar Babaryka's electoral campaign during the presidential elections of 2020 in Belarus. Kalesnikava represented the united campaign of Sviatlana Tsikhanouskaya, then she became a member of the presidium of the Coordination Council formed during the 2020 Belarusian protests in opposition to the regime of Alexander Lukashenko. She is also a founder of the 'Razam' political party.

Kalesnikava was kidnapped by unidentified law enforcement officers on 7 September 2020 and the next morning taken into Ukrainian territory by force. Kalesnikava was intimidated and pressured to leave Belarus, but while on neutral ground she got out of the car through the rear window, tore her passport to pieces and went back on foot. On Belarusian territory she was arrested immediately. Maxim Znak, Kalesnikava's attorney, was detained the next day. On 11 September 2020, Amnesty International recognized Kalesnikava as a prisoner of conscience. She was awarded the International Women of Courage Award in 2021 as well as the Václav Havel Human Rights Prize the same year, accepted on her behalf by her sister. On 6 September 2021, Kalesnikava was sentenced to 11 years in a penal colony for her political activity. She was released in December 2025 and deported from Belarus.

== Early life and musical career ==
Kalesnikava was born on 24 April 1982 in Minsk to a family of engineers. She has one sibling, a sister named Tatiana Khomich. According to Tatiana, their parents were deeply fond of music. They inspired interest in it in their daughters and in a certain way influenced Maria's choice of profession. Maria studied in a music school, then graduated from the Belarusian State Academy of Music as a flutist and conductor.

At the age of 17, Kalesnikava started teaching the flute at a private gymnasium school in Minsk. She also played the flute at the National Academic Concert Orchestra of the Republic of Belarus under the direction of Mikhail Finberg. She played on tours across Italy, Poland, and Lithuania.

At the age of 25, she moved to Germany and enrolled to the State University of Music and Performing Arts in Stuttgart. She got two master's degrees, one in Early Music, and another in Neue Musik in 2012.

In the 2010s, Kalesnikava performed at concerts and was actively involved in organizing international cultural projects in Belarus and Germany, for instance, she was one of the creators of 'Eclat' music festival. Her other projects included 'Music and the Holocaust', school programm 'Orchestra of Robots', and a series of lectures under the title "Music Lessons for Adults".

In 2017, Maria participated in one of the first TEDxNiamiha conferences in Belarus. She took part in creation of the 'Artemp' art community that hosted contemporary art events. In the same year, she became the art director of the 'OK16' culture centre in Minsk.

== Political activity ==
Kalesnikava campaigning for Tsikhanouskaya in Babruysk on 25 July 2020

In May 2020, Kalesnikava became the head of Viktar Babaryka's presidential campaign, who was Alexander Lukashenko's greatest independent competitor at the 2020 Belarusian presidential election. When Babaryka was refused registration and detained, on 16 July 2020, Kalesnikova and representatives of two other independent candidates' campaigns — Sviatlana Tsikhanouskaya (wife of Sergei Tikhanovsky) and Veronika Tsepkalo (wife of Valery Tsepkalo) — announced the creation of a triple alliance. Tsikhanouskaya became their mutual candidate; she gained wide support across the country. When Lukashenko declared himself a winner with 80,1% of the votes, the opposition refused to acknowledge the results and accused Lukashenko of massive falsifications. The USA, Great Britain, Canada and 8 EU countries refused to acknowledge the election's results as legitimate. Street protests and meetings emerged across the country, demanding a repeat election and Lukashenko's dismissal, which were brutally put down by law enforcement.

Kalesnikava in her interviews always emphasized that she wasn't any kind of 'protest leader' and never took part in the meetings' organization. In that time the Belarusian opposition pursued the idea that all citizens were protest leaders and everyone was responsible for his country's future. She visited protest meetings as a private person; via mass media she asked both citizens and law enforcement to preserve peace.

On 18 August 2020, Kalesnikava joined the 7-member presidium of Coordination Council. On 19 August, she was selected as one of the main board members.

By mid-August Tsikhanouskaya and Tsepkalo were forced by authorities to leave the country. Meanwhile, Kalesnikava stated to the media that she by no means would leave Belarus because she felt it was deeply personal not to flee while her colleagues and friends were jailed under unlawful charges.

On 31 August 2020, Kalesnikova announced the start of a new political party, Razam, that she intended to make a democratic tool to protect human rights in the country.

== Arrest and repressions ==
On 7 September 2020, Belarusian media published the news that Kalesnikava was kidnapped in the center of Minsk. Her friends and colleagues could not reach her by phone. Later, witnesses stated that a woman was forcibly put into a black minivan by some unknown men in civilian clothes with covered faces. In the morning of 8 September 2020, the news was published that the authorities tried to deport Maria against her will, she was taken to the Alexandrovka border crossing with Ukraine. Later, Ukrainian Deputy Interior Minister Anton Gerashchenko wrote on his Facebook page, "This was not a voluntary departure. This was a forced deportation from her native country". The State Border Committee of the Republic of Belarus reported that at 4 a.m. she left Belarus together with Ivan Kravtsov and Anton Rodnenkov passed the border control and headed towards Ukraine. State-controlled TV-channels put around the story that Kalesnikava was detained at the border cross when trying to leave the country and move to her sister in Ukraine. In fact, as confirmed by the witnesses Rodnenkov and Kravtsov, in the neutral zone Kalesnikava managed to escape through the rear window of the car where she was kept, tore her passport to pieces, then headed back to Belarusian border. There she was immediately arrested. Following these news, Bundestag vice-chairman Claudia Roth promised to patronage Kalesnikava and help her via Libereco organization.

On 9 September 2020, Kalesnikava's colleague in Coordination Council, lawyer Maxim Znak was also arrested. On the same day, Kalesnikava's father, Aliaksandar Kalesnikau, was notified by the police that she had been jailed at a detention centre in Minsk. Through her lawyers, Maria appealed to the State Investigative Committee with the complaint that KGB and GUBOPiK officers threatened to kill her, they put a sack on her head and promised 'to deport her whether in one piece or in many pieces'. Deputy Head of Department of Home Affairs Gennadiy Kazakevich personally told Kalesnikava that She will be in prison without teeth for 25 years to sew clothes for the security forces.

On 10 September 2020, twelve organizations, including the Viasna Human Rights Centre, the Belarusian Association of Journalists, the Belarusian Helsinki Committee, the Belarusian PEN Center, released a joint statement naming Kalesnikava as a political prisoner. On 11 September 2020, Amnesty International recognized Kalesnikava as a prisoner of conscience.

On 20 August, Alexander Konyuk, the Prosecutor General of Belarus, initiated criminal proceedings against the members of the Coordination Council under Article 361 of the Criminal Code of Belarus, on the grounds of attempting to seize state power and harming national security.

On 12 September, Kalesnikava was transferred from Minsk to prison No. 8 in Zhodino. On 16 September, the Investigative Committee of Belarus charged Kalesnikava with "actions aimed at undermining Belarusian national security" using the media and the Internet.

On 10 October 2020, Kalesnikava's attorney Aliaksandar Pylchanka announced that Lukashenko requested a meeting with her to discuss changes to the Constitution, to which she refused in an expression of solidarity with other imprisoned dissidents. On 8 November 2020, the press office of the Babaryka campaign announced that investigators had extended Kalesnikava's detention until 8 January 2021.

On 6 January 2021, the Coordination Council announced that investigators had extended Kalesnikava's pre-trial detention until 8 March. She was transferred back to Minsk. In the end of the month, on 27 January, the Investigative Committee refused to open a criminal case against law enforcement officers who threatened to kill her.

On 12 February, Kalesnikava and Maxim Znak were charged with "conspiracy to seize state power in an unconstitutional manner" and "establishing and leading an extremist organization". Her attorney Liudmila Kazak was stripped of her license to practice law on 19 February by the Belarus Ministry of Justice. On 9 March 2021, Viktar Babaryka's social media reported that Kalesnikava's pre-trial detention had been extended through 8 May. Her attorney Illia Salei is under house arrest through 16 April. Final charges in May 2021 included three articles of the State Criminal Code. The defence refused all accusations and demanded to drop all charges due to absence of the event of a crime. The investigation and the trial were held behind closed doors, the accused were prohibited to study the case files.

For a year, in detention, Kalesnikava was denied visitors and couldn't meet her father. According to Tatiana Kalesnikava, Maria wrote more than 150 letters per month while jailed, while no more than 20 were received by the addressees. The correspondences sent to her were heavily censored, as Kalesnikava received no more than 5% of letters written to her. She also was prohibited from getting a flute. A year without practice could forever ruin her mastery as a musician.

=== Sentence ===
Starting 4 August 2021, after almost 11 months in custody, Kalesnikava and Maxim Znak stood trial behind closed doors in the Minsk Regional Court. The prosecutor demanded 12 years in prison for both of them. Maria pleaded not guilty and called any charges against herself and Znak 'absurd'. Throughout the investigation and trial, the details of the charges were not publicly disclosed. The attorneys of Kalesnikava and Znak were under a nondisclosure agreement. Though the authorities promised to make the proceedings public, in fact the courtroom was filled with strangers; foreign ambassadors who wanted to support Kalesnikava and Znak weren't allowed inside.

On 6 September 2021, Kalesnikava was sentenced to 11 years in prison. She is serving her sentence in penal colony no. 4 (Russian: ИК №4) in Gomel. Both she and Znak refused to request pardons because they believed they were innocent. They planned to appeal to a higher court.

In a written interview, Kalesnikava told the media that in jail she was offered many times to make a 'Protasevich-like' film recording with confessions and to admit guilt for her actions. In her first interview after the sentence, given by phone to BBC journalist Sara Rainsford, Kolesnikova complained that in prison 'everyone smokes everywhere', and the prolonged passive smoke will forever ruin her chances to come back as a professional flutist. However, she says she regrets nothing and believes that the protests of 2020 were the beginning of a new era in the country. According to Kalesnikava, triumph of democracy in Belarus is only a matter of time.

On 29 November 2022, Kalesnikava was hospitalized in critical condition. As stated by Babaryka's press service, she was put in a punitive isolation cell no later than 22 November. In Homel hospital she was diagnosed with perforated ulcer and had urgent surgery. As mentioned by Maria's sister, she never had any problems with GI tract before prison. In the isolation cell she was denied visits by her lawyer, had fainting spells and hypertension. Only in hospital was she allowed a 10-minute visit from her father, with three law enforcement officers present. On 9 December 2022, one of Kalesnikava's lawyers Uladzimir Pylchanka was disbarred.

For a long period she had been last heard from on 12 February 2023. In August 2023, after no news about Kalesnikava for six months, 13 cultural figures wrote an open letter to Lukashenko demanding information with no answer. On 17 December 2023, the Lev Kopelev Forum held a discussion in Cologne in support of Kalesnikava. The event was attended by former German Interior Minister Gerhart Baum, Kolesnikova's sister Tatsiana Khomich and former lawyer Lyudmila Kazak. She was heard from again after her father was allowed to visit her in prison on 12 November 2024.

=== Conditions of imprisonment ===
Kept in solitary confinement, she was reportedly subjected to inhumane conditions: deprivation of adequate food, lack of medical care and the destruction of letters from her loved ones in front of her. Her weight was said to have dropped to 45 kg.

=== Reactions to Kalesnikava arrest ===
Human rights activists and international community condemn Kalesnikava's sentence, the case is unanimously considered to be fabricated. The sentence is repressive and made as Lukashenko's political revenge.

- (European Union) The European Commission condemned the 7 September arrest, describing it as unacceptable.
- Germany demanded clarity on Kalesnikava's whereabouts and called for the release of all political prisoners in Belarus.
- Lithuania called Kalesnikava's abduction a disgrace, comparing it to something that Stalin-era secret police would have done, and demanded her immediate release.
- Poland denounced Kalesnikava's abduction as contemptible and called on immediate release of all political prisoners in Belarus.
- The United Kingdom expressed serious concern for Kalesnikava's welfare and said that her release must be given the highest priority.
- The United States expressed concern about the attempt to expel Kalesnikava by the Belarusian authorities.
- Amnesty International recognized Kalesnikava as a prisoner of conscience and demanded her immediate release.
- Kosovo's speaker of the Assembly, Vjosa Osmani, along with 9 other members of the parliament, signed a letter demanding the immediate release of Kalesnikava.

=== Release ===
On 13 December 2025, Kalesnikava was handed over to Ukraine along with 123 other prisoners, according to Kyiv's Coordination Headquarters for the Treatment of Prisoners of War, as part of a deal between the Lukashenko regime and the United States. In a statement on Telegram, Ukrainian authorities said that, after receiving necessary medical assistance, the released prisoners would be transported to Poland and Lithuania. Soon after, Kalesnikava arrived in Germany at the invitation of the German authorities. She was scheduled to play her flute in concert in Berlin in April 2026.

While critics disparaged the deal that freed Kalesnikava as "potash for prisoners", she argued that easing sanctions on Belarus's chief export was a small price to pay for freeing activists like herself, in order to help the people of Belarus and the overall position of Europe and the Western world.

== Awards ==
- 2020: Sakharov Prize (European Parliament, Prize for Freedom of Thought)
- 2021: Global Belarusian Solidarity Award by the Center for Belarusian Solidarity in the category "Deed"
- On 8 March 2021 (International Women's Day), Kalesnikava was presented with the International Women of Courage Award from the US Secretary of State, Antony Blinken. The ceremony was virtual due to the ongoing COVID-19 pandemic and included an address by First Lady Jill Biden.
- 2021: Lew-Kopelew-Preis (Germany, peace and human rights award)
- 2021: Stuttgarter Friedenspreis (Germany, award for courageous struggle against the autocratic regime of Alexander Lukashenko)
- 2021: Fritz-Csoklich-Preis (Austria)
- 2021: Menschenrechtspreis der Gerhart und Renate Baum-Stiftung (Germany, human rights award)
- 2021: Václav Havel Human Rights Prize, Parliamentary Assembly of the Council of Europe
- 2022: Theodor Haecker Prize, City of Esslingen
- 2022: Stig Dagerman Prize
- 2022: Bruno Kreisky Prize for Services to Human Rights (The award was presented to Kalesnikava in absentia due to her detention in Belarus; the prize was accepted on her behalf by her sister, Tatsiana Khomich)
- 2022: Charlemagne Prize
