= Razam (Belarusian political party) =

Belarusian political party

Together Разам Вместе
- Leader: Maria Kalesnikava
- Founder: Viktar Babaryka
- Founded: 14 June 2020
- Headquarters: Minsk, Belarus
- Ideology: Anti-Lukashenko; Social liberalism Pro-Europeanism
- Slogan: Разам — пераможам! (English: Together – We will win!)

Website
- vmeste.party

Razam (Belarusian: Разам, pronounced [ˈrazam], Russian: Вместе, romanized: Vmeste, lit. 'Together') is a Belarusian political party founded by Viktar Babaryka and Maria Kalesnikava on 14 June 2020. According to the party leaders, Razam is independent of the work of the Coordination Council, a Belarusian non-governmental body created by presidential candidate Sviatlana Tsikhanouskaya to facilitate a democratic transfer of power as the result of the 2020 Belarusian presidential election.

== History ==
Razam was established on 14 June 2020, ahead of the contested 2020 Belarusian Presidential election. The party's founders later supported Svetlana Tikhanovskaya's claim to have won a decisive first-round victory with at least 60% of the vote in the presidential election on 9 August 2020. The party aims to uphold the demands of the Coordination Council based on Tikhanovskaya's election program. Razam members have been actively participating in the Coordination Council's work to resolve the political crisis through a peaceful dialogue.

On 19 June 2020, Babaryka proposed to amend the Constitution through a referendum. Razam leaders insisted that it was impossible to form an effective governing system in the country without presidential term limits, a clear separation of powers, and meaningful input from the parliament.

== Criticism ==
Political scientists are skeptical about the possibility of the official registration of the party. No political parties have been registered in Belarus since 2000. The registration of the party does not favor the Alexander Lukashenko regime. However, journalists and political commentators note that there is nothing wrong with organizing supporters of change.
