= PB (pistol) =

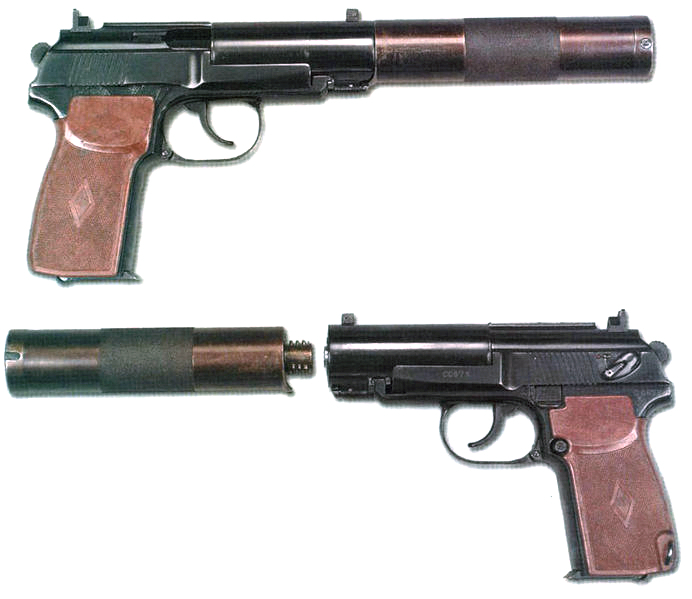
- Type: Integrally suppressed semi-automatic pistol
- Place of origin: Soviet Union

Service history
- In service: 1967–present
- Used by: KGB/FSB; Soviet Army reconnaissance Russian Airborne Forces (VDV)

Production history
- Designer: A.A. Deryagin
- Manufacturer: Izhevsk Mechanical Plant (1967–2013); Kalashnikov Concern (2013–present)
- Produced: 1967–present

Specifications
- Mass: 0.98 kg (2.2 lb)
- Length: 308 mm (12.1 in) (with suppressor); 170 mm (6.7 in) (without suppressor)
- Barrel length: 105 mm (4.1 in) (11,65 calibers)
- Cartridge: 9×18mm Makarov
- Action: Simple blowback, DA/SA
- Rate of fire: 30 rounds/minute
- Muzzle velocity: 290 m/s (950 ft/s)
- Feed system: 8-round detachable box magazine (Makarov pistol)
- Sights: Open iron sights

The PB (Russian: Пистолет бесшумный, romanized: Pistolet besshumnyy, lit. 'Pistol Silent', English: Silent Pistol; GRAU index 6P9) is a Soviet integrally suppressed semi-automatic pistol developed and manufactured by the Izhevsk Mechanical Plant, chambered in 9x18mm, based on the Makarov pistol; since the merger of the Izhevsk Mechanical Plant and the Izhevsk Machine-Building Plant to form the Kalashnikov Concern in 2013, the Kalashnikov Concern has continued to manufacture the PB. The weapon entered service in 1967.

== Design and features ==
The PB uses an integral suppressor, which, unlike most similar systems, consists of two parts. This allows the pistol to be carried and kept concealed without the front section of the suppressor attached, and for the suppressor to be quickly deployed prior to use. The pistol may also be fired safely without the front section attached, which may be important in critical situations. When fired like this, the PB sounds similar to a regular Makarov pistol. The detached suppressor is carried in a special compartment of the holster, which was designed especially for the PB.

The PB's firing mechanism and design is based on that of the Makarov pistol. Because the front part of the barrel is covered by the suppressor, the slide is very short, and therefore does not allow placing a return spring into it. For that reason, the spring is in the grip, and acts on the slide by means of a long lever.

The iron sights are fixed. It uses standard 8-round magazines from the Makarov pistol.

== Users ==
=== Current ===
- Belarus − Used for executions
- Russia − Used by the Spetsnaz, the National Guard, FSB Alpha Group, and reportedly the FSB Vympel Group during counter-terrorism missions
- Ukraine

=== Former ===
- Soviet Union − Used by the KGB, Ministry of Internal Affairs special units (OMON) and Soviet Army reconnaissance groups

== See also ==
- APB suppressed machine pistol
- List of modern Russian small arms and light weapons
