= Rostislav Shavel =

Belarusian professional footballer

Personal information
- Date of birth: 2 April 2001 (age 25)
- Place of birth: Minsk, Belarus
- Height: 1.82 m (6 ft 0 in)
- Position: Forward

Team information
- Current team: Falko Cherkassy

Youth career
- 2017–2020: Gorodeya

Senior career*
Years	Team	Apps	(Gls)
2020–2021	Gorodeya	5	(0)
2022–	Falko Cherkassy	9	(3)

International career
2017	Belarus U17		
- * Club domestic league appearances and goals as of 31 December 2022

Rostislav Shavel (Belarusian: Расціслаў Шавель, romanized: Rastsislau Shavel; Russian: Ростислав Шавель, romanized: Rostislav Shavel; born 2 April 2001) is a Belarusian professional footballer who plays for Falko Cherkassy.

== Football career ==
As of 2021, he last played for Gorodeya, becoming a free agent after the club was liquidated.

== Political persecution (since 2020) ==
Throughout 2020 and 2021 he was arrested multiple times for participation in the peaceful protest against falsified 2020 election results. After serving multiple short-term prison sentences (15, 15 and 3 days), on June 8, 2021, by a joint statement of nine organizations, including the Viasna Human Rights Centre, the Belarusian Helsinki Committee, he was recognized as a political prisoner. On September 22, 2021, he was given three years of house arrest with restricted movement.
