= Viktar Babaryka =

Belarusian banker, philanthropist, and pro-democracy activist (born 1963)

- Віктар Бабарыка
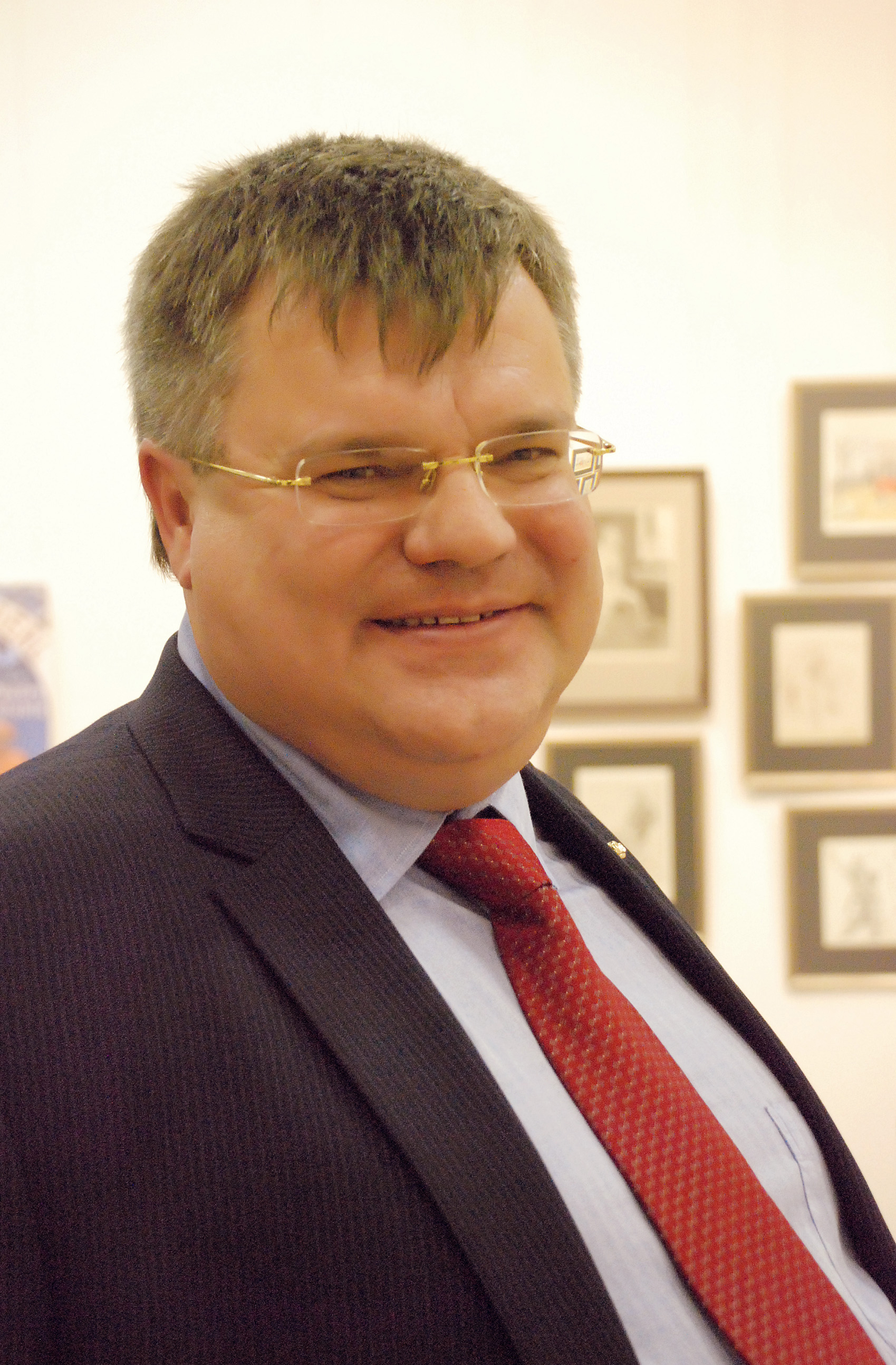
- Babaryka in 2012
- Born: 9 November 1963 (age 62); Minsk, Byelorussian SSR, Soviet Union
- Education: Belarusian State University
- Occupation: Banker
- Known for: Chairman of the Management Board of Belgazprombank (2000–2020); 2020 Belarusian presidential election
- Political party: Razam
- Spouse: Maryna Babaryka (m. 1988; died 2017)
- Children: 2
- Website: Official website

Viktar Dzmitryevich Babaryka (Belarusian: Віктар Дзмітрыевіч Бабарыка or Viktor Dmitryevich Babariko; born 9 November 1963) is a Belarusian banker, philanthropist, public and opposition political figure who intended to become a candidate in the 2020 Belarusian presidential election.

Although official polls were heavily censored by the government of incumbent president Alexander Lukashenko, who was running for re-election, independent polls established Babaryka as the early favorite for the 2020 president election. In June of that year, Babaryka was detained by the Belarusian government over charges of "illegal [financial] activities", leading his candidacy to be rejected the next month and to a 14 years-prison sentence for bribery and tax evasion in January 2021; the charges are considered to be politically motivated, and he is perceived as a political prisoner.

Many collaborators of Babaryka were also detained or sentenced around the same time, including his son Eduard who serves an 8-year prison sentence since July 2023; some fled the country to avoid repercussions. In April 2023, Babaryka was severely injured, allegedly by prison security, and disappeared four days later; although Belarus officials claim that Babaryka is "alive and healthy", this has been characterised as an enforced disappearance from the Belarusian government. In December 2025, he was released from prison by the Belarusian regime and de facto deported from Belarus.

== Life and career ==
Babaryka was born on 9 November 1963 in Minsk. In 1981, he graduated from secondary school No. 92 of Minsk. In 1988, he graduated from the Faculty of Mechanics and Mathematics of the Belarusian State University, in 1995 – the Academy of Public Administration under the aegis of the Cabinet of Ministers of the Republic of Belarus. Five years later, he finished master courses at the Belarusian State Economic University.

Babaryka has been working in the banking system of Belarus since July 1995. In July 2000, he was appointed as the chairman of the management board of Belgazprombank. On 12 May 2020, he voluntarily resigned as chairman of the management board of Belgazprombank and declared his intention to participate in the 2020 Belarusian presidential election. On 19 June 2020, Babaryka was detained. The detainment is believed to be politically motivated. Amnesty International considers Babaryka, his son and several other arrested opposition figures to be prisoners of conscience.

== Philanthropist ==
In 2008, Viktar Babaryka became one of the founders of the International Children's Charity Foundation "Chance". The foundation has been providing charity support to seriously ill children.

In 2018, on the initiative of Babaryka, Belgazprombank financed the publication of 15,000 copies of Svetlana Alexievich's five-volume edition and donated them to Belarusian libraries.

With the support of Viktar Babaryka, the original of Francysk Skaryna's Bible, as well as the paintings of Marc Chagall, Chaïm Soutine and Léon Bakst were returned to Belarus.

Viktar Babaryka also came up with a proposal to create an art-space OK16 organising exhibitions and theatrical performances.

== Running for the presidency ==
On 8 May 2020, the House of Representatives of the National Assembly set the presidential election in the Republic of Belarus on 9 August 2020. On 12 May, Viktar Babaryka expressed the wish to run for the presidency, and on 20 May he registered the second biggest initiative group that included 8,904 persons. The size of the candidate's initiative group almost matched the size of President Alexander Lukashenko with his 11 thousands.

The candidacy of Babaryka was publicly supported by Belarusian cultural figures including Nobel Prize laureate Svetlana Alexievich and director Andrej Kurejchyk. On 17 June, philosopher Uladzimir Matskevich (previously supporting the boycott of the election) left his signature to endorse Babaryka's running for presidency as a sign of solidarity with all the people who were persecuted during the election campaign and to encourage the opponents of Alexander Lukashenko's regime to unite around Babaryka, who had become the de facto leader of the Belarusian opposition. Apart from that, two former presidential candidates of the 2010 election also spoke out in support of Viktar Babaryka: Uladzimir Nyaklyayew (13 June) and Andrei Sannikov (15 June).

At the end of May, Internet polls showed that Viktar Babaryka was ranking first with more than 50% support. In view of such results, Belarusian authorities recategorized website surveys as equivalent to national public opinion polls, which can only be conducted by institutions with a special accreditation (not a single media agency possesses such an accreditation); electoral ratings of politicians have not been published in the country since 2016. On 31 May, Viktar Babaryka presented the Declaration of Fair Elections.

According to Belarusian legislation, in order to be registered as a presidential candidate, a person has to submit 100,000 signatures in his/her support – the initiative group gathered the needed amount by 6 June. By 9 June, Babaryka broke the record of Zianon Pazniak by gathering 230,000 signatures. By 19 June, Babaryka's team reported 425,000 signatures gathered.

On 17 June, the bank account of Babaryka's electoral fund in Belarusbank was blocked. According to the election team, more than 100,000 Belarusian rubles were frozen (approx. US$42,000).

On 20 June, Babaryka's team submitted the whole package of documents, including the needed number of signatures, to the Central Election Commission of Belarus.

On 14 July 2020, Babaryka was denied the registration as a candidate for presidency. A number of political scientists believe that, by doing so, the Chairperson of the Central Election Commission of Belarus deliberately violated the Constitution under the direction of incumbent President Lukashenko.

On 16 July, by the initiative of Viktar's Babaryka team together with the team of another unregistered alternative candidate Valery Tsepkalo a meeting in Babaryka's team office was held with registered alternative candidate Sviatlana Tsikhanouskaya, where a decision of joint presidential campaign was made. Later that day teams made an announcement on joining efforts to win presidential elections. Despite popular belief, there was no joint headquarters during the presidential campaign. Babariko's staff took over the organization of performances by candidates and trustees, Tsepkalo's staff concentrated on informational work, and Tikhanovska's staff adapted the campaign to her audience.

== Viktar Babaryka's campaign ==
Key people:

- Eduard Babariko, son, businessman, head of the election headquarters, detained on June 18, 2020
- Maria Kalesnikava, art-director of the cultural hub (center) "Ok16", detained on September 7, 2020
- Maxim Znak, lawyer, detained on September 9, 2020.
- Illia Salei, lawyer, detained on 9 September 2020.
- Maxim Bogretsov, former vice-president of EPAM Systems, HQ representative
- Ivan Kravtsov, architect, businessman, HQ representative, left Belarus September 8, 2020
- Anton Randnianlou, political expert, left Belarus September 8, 2020

On 9 September 2020, unknown masked men seized a member of the headquarters team and a member of the presidium of the Coordination Council, Maxim Znak, from the headquarters office at 25/1 V. Horuzhey Street in Minsk. Then the headquarters was searched and computer equipment and documents were confiscated. At the same time, unknown persons in civilian clothes and masks entered the house of Babarika's headquarters leader and member of the presidium of the Coordination Council of the opposition Maria Kalesnikava in the center of Minsk.

== Criminal prosecution ==
On 11 June 2020, a government search and seizure campaign started in Belgazprombank. Three members of Babaryka's initiative group, including the coordinator in Mogilev Region, former vice-mayor of Mogilev Uladzimir Dudarau, were detained. On the next day, the State Control Committee of the Republic of Belarus announced that 15 former and current employees of Belgazprombank had been detained. The committee's Department of Financial Investigation brought a criminal case pursuant to part 2 of Article 243 "Tax and duties evasion on a massive scale" and part 2 of Article 245 "Money laundering on a massive scale". At first, Viktar Babaryka was not targeted by the investigation, but, according to the Head of State Control Committee Ivan Tertel, the investigation team had "solid evidence of Babaryka's involvement in illegal activities" and "most of the detainees are cooperating with the investigating authorities and making confessions". Babaryka himself maintained that the investigation had no actual compromising materials and that the criminal case had purely political implications – this statement was indirectly confirmed by Alexander Lukashenko who said that "he had commissioned the State Control Committee to inspect the activities of Belgazprombank". The lawyers of the NGO "Pravovaja Initsiativa" ("Legal Initiative") declared that the claims of the State Control Committee, the President and his press-secretary about Babaryka's complicity and the guilt of persons detained within Belgazprombank case were unacceptable and crudely violated human rights, and was only intended to cut off Babaryka's presidential bid.

On 18 June 2020, Viktar Babaryka and his son and head of the initiative group Eduard Babayka were detained – later on it was reported that Babaryka had been arrested and sent to the Pre-Trial Detention Centre of the KGB of Belarus. According to the key charges, over a couple of years Belgazprombank had transferred more than 430 million dollars from its account to Latvia, and Viktar Babaryka was the "mastermind behind the crime". Starting from 19 June, the case has been investigated by the State Security Committee of the Republic of Belarus (KGB), as the defendants "put at risk national security interests". On 20 June, charges were pressed against Viktar Babaryka, and on the following day, against his son Eduard. In both cases the grounds for arrest were kept secret. Viktar and Eduard Babaryka are kept in custody in the Pre-Trial Detention Centre of the KGB of Belarus.

On 29 June 2020, Amnesty International recognized Viktar and Eduard Babaryka, as well as a number of Lukashenko's opponents, as prisoners of conscience.

On 2 July 2020, it was reported that Viktar Babaryka was accused of criminal offence pursuant to part 2 of Article 243 (tax and duties evasion on a massive scale), part 2 of Article 245 (money laundering on a massive scale) and part 2 of Article 431 (recurrent bribery or bribery on a massive scale) of the Belarusian Criminal Code. On 3 July, during a closed session Minsk City Court considered and dismissed Babaryka's complaint about the decision of the Court of Central District to keep him in custody.

On 10 October 2020, Lukashenko spoke with the imprisoned Babaryka, his son Eduard, and fellow candidate Sergei Tikhanovsky in a four-hour meeting concerning changes to the Constitution. Babaryka's election campaign coordinator Yuriy Voskresensky was subsequently released and spoke against public protests on state television. Babaryka campaign manager Maria Kalesnikava refused to attend this meeting. She and Babaryka remain in custody at this time.

On 6 November 2020, the court denied Babaryka's motion to end his pre-trial detention, which had been extended to 18 December. Babaryka was represented by his attorneys as he was not allowed to appear in person at this hearing.

== Criminal trial ==
The criminal trial of Viktar Babaryka commenced on 17 February 2021 at the Maskouski District Court in Minsk. On the first day of the trial, his attorney Dzmitry Layeuski requested house arrest for the defendant, and to have him tried by a lower level court. Both motions were denied by Judge Ihar Lyubavitski. The public is not permitted to enter the courtroom as audience members. The only media permitted in the courtroom were state-affiliated media. He faces charges of grand bribery by an organized group and large-scale laundering of illicit funds. If found guilty, he may face up to 15 years in prison. On 28 June 2021, he pled innocent and said he could not "confess to crimes he did not commit". On 6 July 2021, Babaryka was sentenced to 14 years' imprisonment after being found guilty on bribery and tax evasion.

In July 2023, Eduard Babaryka was sentenced to eight years in prison.

=== Hospitalisation and disappearance ===
On the night of 24 and 25 April 2023, Babaryka was, according to worker's rights group Rabočy Ruch, subjected to beating by prison security and subsequently transported to the surgical department of the Novopolotsk hospital three days later. At the time, he was described as being in a "moderately severe" state of health by the Telegram channel of his electoral team. He subsequently disappeared from the hospital the next day, and has not been seen since.

Babaryka's disappearance, along with the disappearances of Maxim Znak, Sergei Tikhanovsky, and others, has been characterised as an enforced disappearance by the office of Sviatlana Tsikhanouskaya, citing a report from the United Nations Human Rights Committee. The European Parliament has also condemned Babaryka's disappearance and blamed the government of Belarus.

Prison officials have denied that Babaryka has disappeared, claiming that he is "alive and healthy" and continues to serve out his sentence.

In January 2025, Roman Protasevich paid a visit to Babaryka.

=== Release ===
On 13 December 2025, he was released by the Belarusian regime and deported from Belarus to Ukraine in exchange for the lifting of sanctions on the Belarusian potash industry by the United States. Soon after, Babaryka arrived in Germany at the invitation of the German authorities.

== Public opinion ==
According to unofficial Internet polls, at least half of respondents were ready to support Babaryka in the upcoming presidential election over incumbent Alexander Lukashenko (assuming his candidacy would be allowed).

== Personal life ==
=== Family ===
His wife Marina died on 15 August 2017.

Children:

- son Eduard: businessman, founder of the crowdfunding platform Ulej, co-founder of the platform MolaMola.
- daughter Mariya: lives in Australia.

== Orders and honors ==
- In January 2002, the President of the Republic of Belarus Alexander Lukashenko officially thanked Babaryka for his significant contribution to the development of the banking system of Belarus.
