= Maxim Znak =

Belarusian lawyer and pro-democracy activist

- Максім Знак
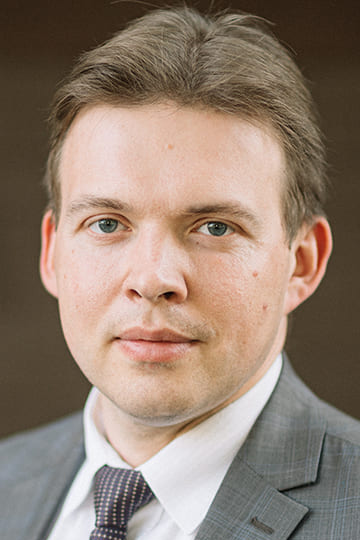
- Znak in 2020
- Born: 4 September 1981 (age 45); Minsk, Byelorussian SSR, Soviet Union (now Belarus)
- Citizenship: Belarusian
- Education: Belarusian State University
- Occupations: Politician, lawyer

Maxim Aliaksandravič Znak (Belarusian: Максім Аляксандравіч Знак; born 4 September 1981) is a Belarusian lawyer and politician, part of Viktar Babaryka's team, lawyer of Sviatlana Tsikhanouskaya, and a member of the presidium of the Coordination Council formed during the 2020–21 Belarusian protests in opposition to the rule of Alexander Lukashenko. Along with fellow opposition leader Maria Kolesnikova, Znak actively participated in the demonstrations and protests against the Lukashenko government after Sviatlana Tsikhanouskaya had left the country. He was sentenced to 10 years in prison by the Belarusian authorities. He was freed and exiled in 2025.

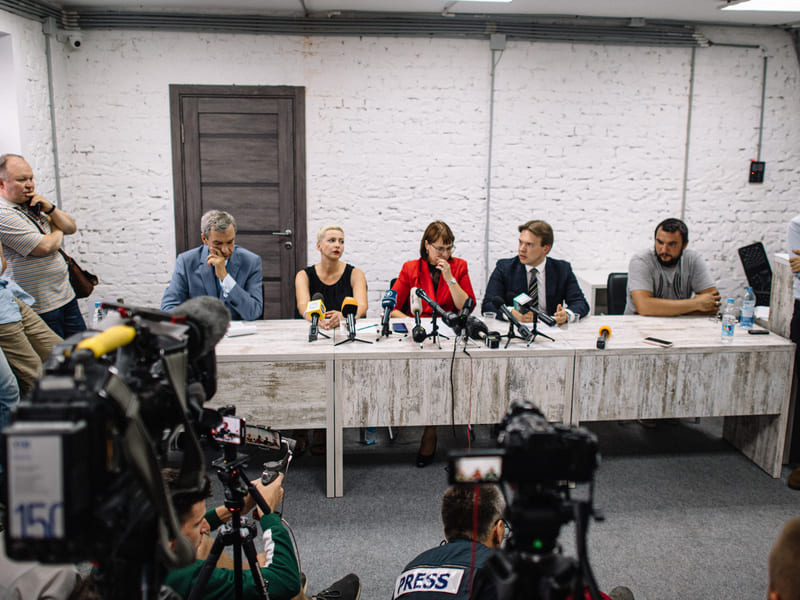
Maxim Znak, Olga Kovalkova, and Maria Kolesnikova during the first press conference of the Coordination Council of Belarus

== Childhood and education ==
Znak obtained his PhD in Law from the Belarusian State University.

== Legal career ==
Znak provided legal support for presidential candidate Viktar Babaryka, who was jailed in June 2020 during the Lukashenko 26-year presidency of Belarus, prior to the 2020 Belarusian presidential election. Babaryka had intended to contest the 2020 Belarus election before being rejected by election officials.

== Coordination Council and detention ==
Znak is one of the members of the presidium of the Coordination Council of Belarus that aims to help coordinate a transition to democracy in Belarus.

On 9 September 2020, he was abducted and detained by a gang of masked men wearing plain clothes. Prior to his detention, he was widely regarded as the last active member of the Coordination Council. He was detained by supporters of Lukashenko just two days after the forced deportation of his colleague and the former opposition leader Maria Kolesnikova. On 9 September, Znak had planned to attend a video press conference with Babaryka. He was kidnapped by masked men and did not attend the press conference. Znak's colleagues stated that he was detained in Minsk and that he had texted the word "masks" to them after his abduction. As of 9 September 2020, the Coordination Council has been unable to contact Maxim Znak following his detention. He has been briefly described as a "missing person".

On 9 November 2020 Znak's attorneys announced that his detention had been extended to 9 January 2021. As of 21 January 2021, he has remained in SIZO No. 1 in Minsk.

On February 12, Znak and fellow Coordination Council member Maria Kalesnikava were charged with “conspiracy to seize state power in an unconstitutional manner” and “establishing and leading an extremist organization. On 9 March, Znak's attorney announced that his pre-trial detention had been extended through 9 May 2021.

Starting 4 August 2021, after almost 11 months in custody, Znak and Kalesnikava stood trial behind closed doors in the Minsk Regional Court. They faced up to 12 years in prison. Both pleaded not guilty. Throughout the investigation and trial, the details of the charges were not publicly disclosed. The attorneys of Kalesnikava and Znak were under a nondisclosure agreement. Znak explained that the court sessions were closed because the authorities did not want the public to know that 'the charges are not reality based'.

Znak was held in Remand Prison no.1, one of the only prison's in Europe that still carries out the death penalty. During his holding, Znak produced a manuscript of 100 stories based on the 14th century Decameron, depicting tales of "resistance and self-assertion and the genuine warmth and appreciation of fellow prisoners". The manuscript was transported out of the prison to translator Jim Dingley who sent it on to Edinburgh-based publisher Scotland Street Press, who published the book in 2023 with the permission of Znak's wife and sister. The book went on to win the English PEN Award 2023, and was shortlisted for the Republic of Consiousness Prize 2024.

On 6 September 2021, Znak was sentenced to 10 years in prison. Amnesty International condemned the sentence. On September 21, 2021, Znak and Kalesnikava appealed against their sentences to the State Supreme Court.

On December 13, 2025, Maksim Znak, along with several other Belarusian political prisoners, was released and deported to Ukraine.

== Awards and honours ==
- The International Bar Association Award for Outstanding Contribution to Human Rights (2021).
- One of four Belarusian lawyers awarded the 2021 Human Rights Award by the Council of Bars and Law Societies of Europe.
- One of the recipients of the 2022 Franco-German Prize for Human Rights and the Rule of Law.
- Ales Adamovich Prize (2022), awarded for human dignity and creativity under inhumane conditions.
- Shortlisted for the 2024 Disturbing the Peace Award presented by the Vaclav Havel Center.
- The 2025 Disturbing the Peace Award presented by the Vaclav Havel Center.
