= Execution by shooting =

Method of execution

Execution by shooting is a method of capital punishment in which a person is shot to death by one or more firearms. It is the most common method of execution worldwide, used in about 70 countries, with execution by firing squad being one particular form.

In most countries, execution by a firing squad has historically been considered a more honorable death and was used primarily for military personnel, though in some countries — among them Belarus, the only country in Europe today that has the death penalty — the single executioner shooting inherited from the Soviet past is still in use.

== Brazil ==
Although Brazil abolished capital punishment in peacetime, it can be used for certain crimes in wartime, such as betrayal, conspiracy, mutiny, unauthorised retreat in battles, and theft of equipment or supplies in a military base. The execution method in this case is execution by shooting.

== Europe ==
=== Belarus ===
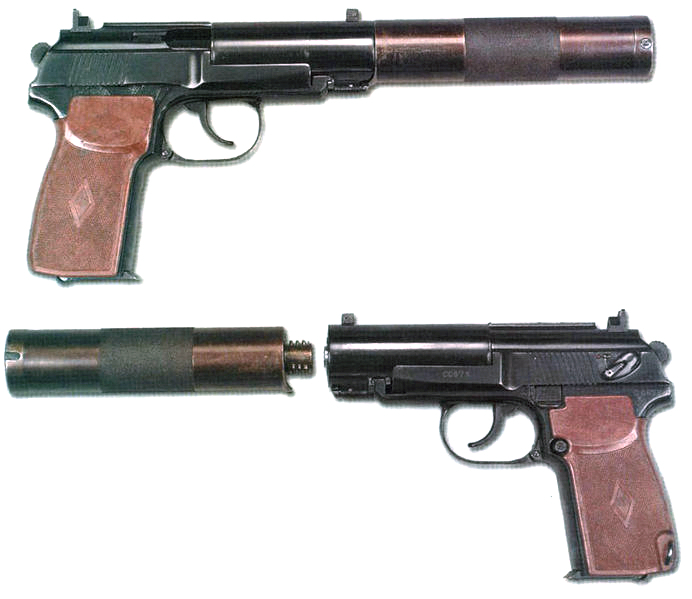
A PB pistol with suppressor, used for executions in Belarus

In Belarus, executions are performed by a single executioner shooting the condemned through the brain from behind with a suppressed pistol.

=== Germany ===
In Germany, shooting by a single bullet to the back of the head was the execution method used in East Germany from 1968 until the abolition of capital punishment in 1987 (although the last execution was carried out in 1981 with Werner Teske being the last executed anywhere in Germany). All executions in East Germany were conducted at a central execution place, located at the Leipzig Prison. Prisoners were not informed about the imminent execution until a few seconds before it was carried out — the prisoner was put to wait in an office and have one hour to write a farewell letter to their family. After a while, an officer would enter the office, telling the prisoner that their execution was imminent. The prisoner was then led into another room, passing three people — the warden, a public prosecutor and the executioner — seemingly by coincidence while walking on the corridor. While passing the executioner, one single shot was fired into the back of the prisoner's head from close range without having the barrel of the pistol touching the prisoners skin. This method was named "unexpected shot on close range" and it was taken great care that the execution was conducted without officers having to handle the prisoner manually in order to prevent any stress reactions. See Capital punishment in Germany.

=== Soviet bloc ===
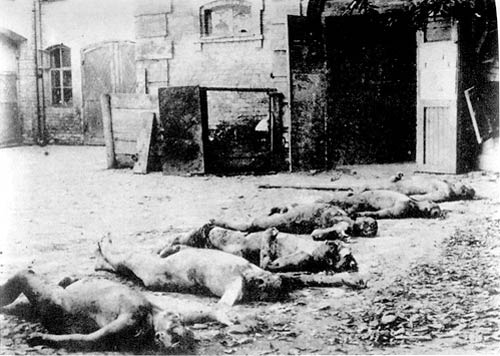
Lined up people executed by shooting by Cheka in 1918 during the Red Terror at a yard in Kharkiv, Ukrainian SSR, The Black Book of Communism

In 20th-century communist states, shooting was a standard form of execution of civilian and military prisoners alike, with the Soviet Union setting an example of the single-executioner approach. The firing squad, with its solemn and lengthy ceremony was used infrequently.

The most common method was the firing of a pistol bullet ("nine grams of lead") into the brain.

This method was widely used during the Great Purges of the late 1930s at locations outside the major cities, e.g. Krasny Bor near Petrozavodsk, against purportedly anti-social elements, "counter-revolutionaries" and other enemies of the people.

It was also used to execute those who had committed ordinary criminal offenses. Even after the breakup of the Soviet Union, people continued to be executed by shooting. Serial killers Andrei Chikatilo and Sergey Golovkin were executed in this way in 1994 and 1996, respectively, the latter just before Russia discontinued capital punishment as part of its accession to the Council of Europe.

=== United Kingdom ===
No British citizen was ever executed for a civilian crime by shooting by the British judiciary. Execution by firing squad was solely a military punishment. A Royal Commission on Capital Punishment considered shooting as a possible alternative to hanging, although the findings published in 1953 concluded shooting was not a sufficiently effective means of execution to justify a change to the method from hanging.

== United States ==
Since 1608, about 142 men have been judicially shot in the United States and its English-speaking predecessor territories, excluding executions related to the American Civil War. During the American Civil War, 433 of the 573 men executed were shot dead by a firing squad: 186 of the 267 executed by the Union Army, and 247 of the 306 executed by the Confederate Army.

Today, execution by shooting is allowed in the US states of Florida, Idaho, Oklahoma, South Carolina and Utah, as well as Mississippi.

In the United States, while most executions via shooting have used the traditional firing squad method, Florida enacted legislation in 2025 that opens the possibility of single shot executions like those in Belarus. This July 2025 law further expands the state's already extensive capital punishment laws to allow "any execution method not explicitly deemed unconstitutional," which includes all shooting executions. This makes the United States the only country in the Americas that currently allows executions via single shot, albeit only in Florida so far.

== Asia ==
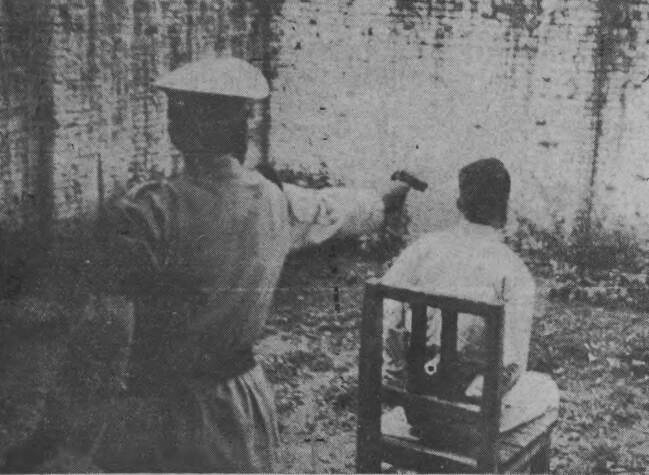
An execution by shooting in Shanghai in 1948

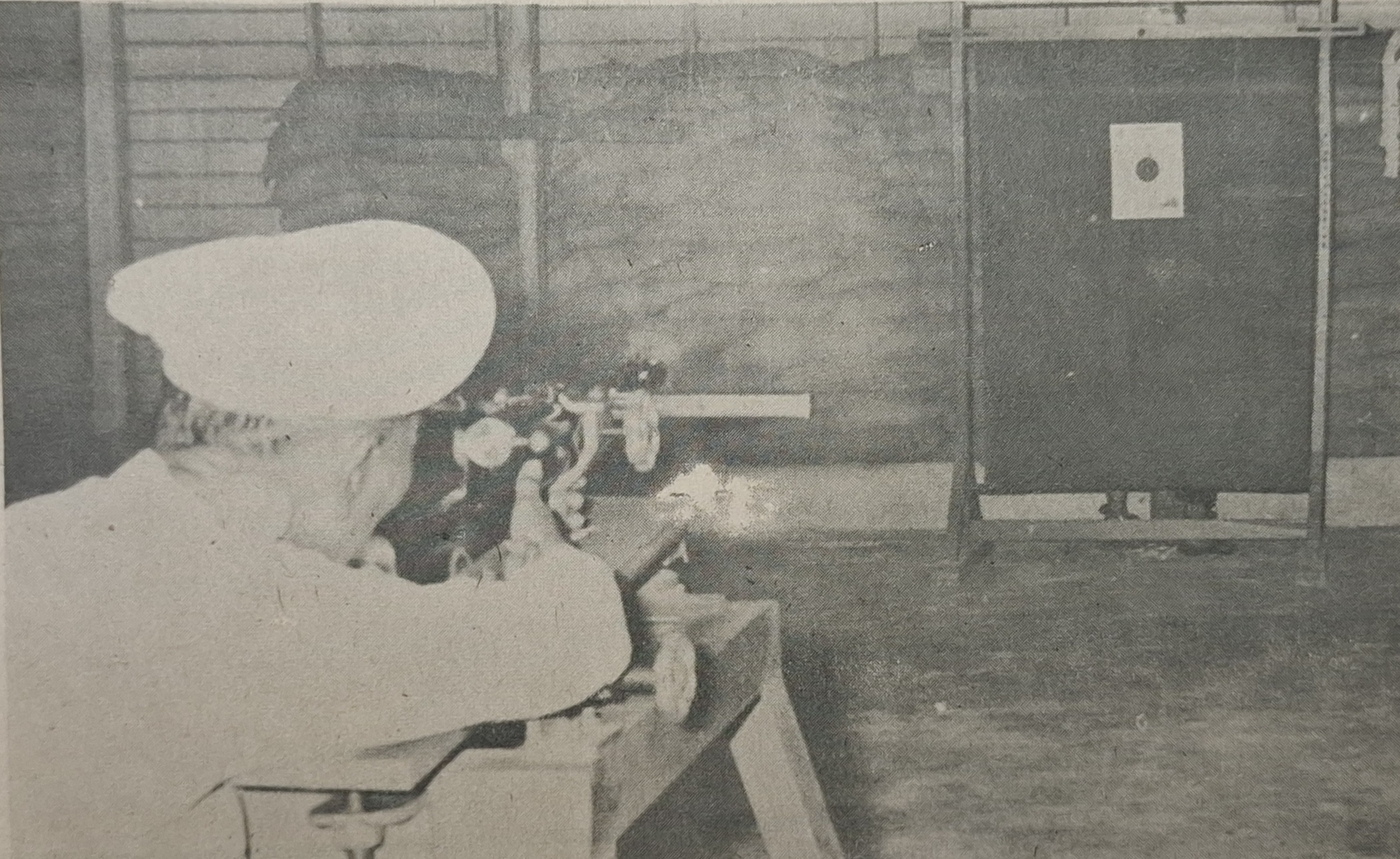
An execution by shooting in Bang Kwang Central Prison in 1972

=== Countries where shooting or firing squad is currently used ===
- Bahrain uses firing squads for execution.
- Indonesia administers capital punishment in Indonesia by firing squad, with shots aimed at the heart.
- North Korea carries out executions by firing squad in public, making it one of the few countries known to practice public execution.
- Oman uses firing squads for execution.
- United Arab Emirates uses shooting as the primary method of execution.
- Yemen uses shooting as the primary method of execution. While some executions are private, many of these shooting executions are carried out in public, as documented under capital punishment in Yemen.

=== Countries that formerly (or have rarely) used shooting but now use other methods ===
- China historically used shooting as a method of execution—either by a pistol shot to the back of the head or neck, or by a rifle shot from behind—but since 1997 many executions have increasingly shifted to lethal injection under capital punishment in China. Hong Kong abolished the death penalty and Macau never had the death penalty prior to the handover, and neither restored it when they returned to Chinese sovereignty.
- India historically used shooting during the Mughal period, including the practice known as blowing from a gun, which was later continued by the British, particularly after the Sepoy Mutiny of 1857. Executions are now carried out by long-drop hanging under capital punishment in India.
- Mongolia abolished capital punishment in 2016; prior to abolition, executions involved a bullet to the neck fired from a .38 caliber revolver, a method inherited from Soviet legislation, as documented under capital punishment in Mongolia.
- Myanmar has carried out executions by shooting under capital punishment in Myanmar.
- Taiwan formerly used shooting as the customary method of execution, involving a single shot aimed at the heart after the prisoner was rendered unconscious by anesthetic, as described under capital punishment in Taiwan.
- Thailand carried out executions by shooting from 1934 until 2003, using a mounted submachine gun; executions since then are performed by lethal injection under capital punishment in Thailand.
- Vietnam used firing squads prior to 2011, using SKS rifles and now carries out executions by lethal injection under capital punishment in Vietnam.

=== Countries where shooting is legal but not commonly used ===
- Iran typically carries out executions by hanging, particularly civilian executions; however, on relatively rare occasions (usually in cases pertaining to military and political crimes), people have been executed by firing squad or shooting in Iran, with one of the most recent documented shooting executions having occurred in 2008. Executions by shooting are legal under Iranian law per capital punishment in Iran.
- Saudi Arabia permits shooting as a method of execution under capital punishment in Saudi Arabia, though beheading is more common.

== See also ==
- Bullet fee
- Execution by firing squad
- Use of capital punishment by nation
