= Capital punishment in Europe =

Europe holds the greatest concentration of abolitionist states (blue). Map current as of 2022 Abolished for all offences Abolished in practice Retains capital punishment

Capital punishment has been completely abolished in all European countries except for Belarus and Russia, the latter of which has a moratorium and has not carried out an execution since August 1996. The complete ban on capital punishment is enshrined in both the Charter of Fundamental Rights of the European Union (EU) and two widely adopted protocols of the European Convention on Human Rights of the Council of Europe, and is thus considered a central value. Of all modern European countries, San Marino, Portugal, and the Netherlands were the first to abolish capital punishment, whereas only Belarus still practises capital punishment in some form or another. In 2012, Latvia became the last EU member state to abolish capital punishment in wartime.

The last execution in Europe took place in Belarus, which carried out one execution in 2024.

== Abolition ==
=== Legal instruments in Europe ===
The Council of Europe has two main instruments against capital punishment: Protocol 6 and Protocol 13.

Protocol 6, opened for signing in 1983, which prohibits capital punishment during peacetime has been ratified by all members of the Council of Europe.

Protocol 13, opened for signing in 2002, prohibits capital punishment in all circumstances. All member states of the Council of Europe have ratified it except Azerbaijan, which have signed but not yet ratified. Still, Azerbaijan had already abolished capital punishment in 1998. Armenia is the latest country to ratify Protocol 13 in February 2024, having however abolished the death penalty since 2003.

=== 21st century ===
The only country in Europe that continues to execute in the 21st century is Belarus (last execution done in 2022).

No member of the Council of Europe has carried out executions in the 21st century. The last execution on the present day territory of the Council of Europe took place in 1997 in Ukraine.

=== History ===
Abolition began to appear in European history towards the end of the 18th century, but has only been a real trend since the end of the Second World War when human rights became a particular priority. In the United Principalities of Moldavia and Wallachia (Romania) and Portugal, the death penalty had been abolished for civil crimes in 1864 and 1867 respectively, but was more or less reinstated during the 20th century. The Kingdom of Italy had abolished the death penalty for civilians with the adoption of the Zanardelli Penal Code of 1889 (previously it had not been applied in Tuscany alone since 1859, or even earlier, in the Grand Duchy of Tuscany, for brief periods starting in 1786), but the Fascist regime reintroduced capital punishment in 1926, then expanding its range of cases with the 1930 Penal Code. In the Netherlands, too, it was declared "cruel and uncivilized" and abolished, again for civil crimes alone, in 1870. In San Marino, after not having been physically carried out for centuries, it was definitively abolished for all crimes in 1865.

The European Convention on Human Rights was adopted in 1950, but some countries took many years to ratify it. The United Kingdom retained the death penalty for high treason until 1998; however, this technicality was superseded by the absolute ban on the death penalty in 1976. William Joyce was the last person to be put to death for high treason in the UK, on 3 January 1946 at Wandsworth Prison.

A moratorium on the death penalty has been in place in Russia since 1 January 2010. According to the 19 November 2009 decision of the Constitutional Court of the Russian Federation, the death penalty shall not be practiced in Russia at any time before the ratification of the above-mentioned protocol. The Constitutional Court has also clarified that the decision is not an extension of the moratorium but the abolition of the capital punishment, since it will be no longer possible to practice it legally.

2009 was the first year that no one was executed anywhere in Europe, however in March 2010, Belarus resumed executions, with the most recent one taking place in October 2024.

The European Union has long since been opposed to the death penalty, supporting the European Convention, and its 2000 Charter of Fundamental Rights included an absolute ban on the death penalty in all circumstances. The Charter has been made legally binding by the Treaty of Lisbon as it was fully ratified and became effective on 1 December 2009. The treaty also has a provision for the EU to join the Council of Europe and accede to the European Convention on Human Rights.

The EU has been an active promoter of abolition worldwide and has been promoting a United Nations moratorium on the death penalty. No member state of EU has ever performed executions since its establishment on 1 November 1993. The only state to have performed executions in Europe whilst a member of the EEC, the EU's predecessor, is France, last shooting a prisoner in 1963 and last beheading one with the guillotine in 1977. The death penalty was abolished in France in 1981 at the firm and stubborn initiative of President François Mitterrand. All other states, too, had effectively abolished capital punishment prior to the EU's formation—at least within their metropolitan European territories and regarding peacetime offenses. Those that had not fully abolished it soon extended the ban to wartime offenses as well, and since then, a complete renunciation of the death penalty has become a necessary requirement for the admission of new states to the EU. Outside the metropolitan European Territory, two hangings were carried out in 1977 in Bermuda, a Special Territory of the EEC as an Overseas Territory of the United Kingdom (after the United Kingdom joined the EEC in 1973). Due to later abolition dates in countries that joined later, there have been more recent executions in places that are now part of the EU, the most recent example being Latvia, which shot a prisoner in 1996.

The Council of Europe has made abolition of the death penalty a prerequisite for membership. As a result, no execution has taken place on the territory of the organisation's member states since 1997. The Parliamentary Assembly of the Council of Europe continues to monitor the capital punishment issue. The current General Rapporteur on the abolition of the death penalty for the Parliamentary Assembly is German Member of Parliament Marina Schuster.

Country	Method	Year of last use (peacetime)	Abolished (peacetime)	Year of last use (wartime)	Abolished (wartime)
Albania	Firing squad, hanging	1992	2000	?	2007
Andorra	Garrotte, firing squad	1943	1993		1993
Armenia	Single shot	1991	2003	?	2003
Austria	Hanging	1950	1950	?	1968?
Belarus	Single shot	2022	–	?	–
Belgium	Guillotine, firing squad	1950	1996	1950	1996
Bosnia and Herzegovina	Firing squad	1977	2000	?	2000?
Bulgaria	Firing squad	1989	1998	?	1998?
Croatia	Firing squad	1987	1990	?	1997?
Cyprus	Hanging	1962	2002	?	2002?
Czech Republic	Hanging	1989	1990	1948	1990
$**$ Denmark	Decapitation, firing squad	1892	1930	1950	1994
Estonia	Single shot	1991	1998	?	1998?
Finland	Firing squad, beheading, hanging	1825	1949	1944	1972
France	Guillotine, firing squad	1977	1981	1961	1981
Germany	Guillotine, hanging, firing squad	1951	1949	?	1949
(Georgia (country)) Georgia	Shooting	1995	1997	1993	1997
Greece	Firing squad	1972	1975	?	2004
Hungary	Hanging	1988	1990	?	1990
Iceland	Public beheading	1830	1928	–	1928
(Republic of Ireland) Ireland	Hanging	1954	1990	1922	2002
Italy	Firing squad	1947	1948	1947	1994
Kosovo	Firing squad	1987	1999	?	1999
Latvia	Shooting	1996	1999	?	2012
Liechtenstein	Public beheading	1785	1989	?	1989
Lithuania	Shooting	1995	1996	?	1998
Luxembourg	Hanging, firing squad	1948	1979	1949	1979
Malta	Hanging	1943	1971	1942	2000
Moldova	?	None since independence	1995	None since independence	2005
Monaco	Guillotine	1929	1962 or 1964	?	1962 or 1964
Montenegro	Firing squad	1981	2002	None since independence	2002
Netherlands	Hanging, firing squad	1860	1870	1952	1983
North Macedonia	Firing squad	1988	1991	?	1991
Norway	Beheading, firing squad	1876	1902	1948	1979
Poland	Hanging	1988	1997	?	1997
Portugal	Hanging, garrotte, firing squad	1846	1867	1917	1976
Romania	Firing squad	1989	1990	?	1991
Russia	Single shot	1999 (in Chechnya); 1996 (mainland Russia)	–	?	–
San Marino	Hanging	1468 or 1677	1848	?	1865
Serbia	Firing squad	1992	2002	?	2002
Slovakia	Hanging	1989	1990	None since independence	1990
Slovenia	Hanging	1959	1989	?	1991
Spain	Garrotte, firing squad	1975	1978	1939	1995
Sweden	Guillotine$*$, beheading, hanging	1910	1921	?	1973
Switzerland	Beheading, firing squad	1940	1942	1944	1992
Turkey	Hanging	1984	2002	1921	2004
Ukraine	Single shot	1997	2000	?	2000
United Kingdom	Hanging	1964	1965 (suspended) 1969 (abolished)	1953	1998
Vatican City	Mazzatello, hanging, beheading, guillotine	1870 (as Papal States)	1969	?	1969

$*$Only used once, at the very last execution in Sweden $**$Abandoned totally in 1930, however reintroduced 1945-1950 for certain collaborations with the occupying Nazi German forces between August 1943 and May 1945. Executions carried out by the police.

==== Former countries ====
Country	Method	Year of last use (peacetime)	Abolished (peacetime)	Year of last use (wartime)	Abolished (wartime)
East Germany	Guillotine, single shot	1981	1987	1945	1987

== Belarus ==
The only European country that executes criminals is Belarus, as that country is not part of the European Convention on Human Rights. Executions in Belarus are carried out by shooting.

== Russia ==
Capital punishment in Russia has been indefinitely suspended, although it still remains codified in its law. There exists both an implicit moratorium established by the President Yeltsin in 1996, and an explicit one, established by the Constitutional Court of Russia in 1999 and which was most recently reaffirmed in 2009. Russia has not executed anyone in the Russian Federation since August or September 1996 (except one in 1999 in the Chechen Republic, a former limited recognition state). However, Russia was suspended from the Council of Europe in the wake of its 2022 invasion of Ukraine, and subsequently announced its intention to withdraw from the organization before being effectively expelled, former President and Prime Minister Dmitry Medvedev endorsed restoring death penalty in Russia.

== Bosnia and Herzegovina ==
The death penalty in Bosnia and Herzegovina has been constitutionally abolished since 1995. However, it was only on 4 October 2019 that capital punishment was completely erased from the Constitution of Republika Srpska, one of Bosnia and Herzegovina's two entities. While it was still in place, it was endorsed under Article 11 of the Constitution of Republika Srpska.

== Separatist territories and partially recognized jurisdictions ==
In Europe there are also partially unrecognized states. In 2006, the Parliamentary Assembly of the Council of Europe wrote that:

While Artsakh abolished the death penalty on 1 August 2003, when it decided to implement the Republic of Armenia's new Criminal Code on its territory, the other territories, Abkhazia, Transnistria and South Ossetia, have not done so, retaining capital punishment in their legislation both in peacetime and in wartime. As South Ossetia decided in 1992 to make Russian legislation applicable on its territory, it has observed a moratorium on executions since 1996. The death penalty is in the Transnistrian Criminal Code which came into force in 2002. In July 1999, de facto President Smirnov ordered a moratorium on executions, and there is said to be only one prisoner on death row in Transnistria.

Abkhazia formalized its moratorium in 2007, moving towards full abolition. On 12 January 2007 the parliament of Abkhazia adopted a law entitled "Moratorium on the Death Penalty", establishing a moratorium on executions during peacetime. Since 1993 the country has had a de facto moratorium on executions. Although there have been 10 sentences of death in Abkhazia, these have never been implemented.

The Turkish Republic of Northern Cyprus retains the death penalty only for crimes committed under special circumstances (war crimes). See also Capital punishment in Cyprus.

There is no death penalty in Kosovo.

The Donetsk People's Republic introduced the death penalty in 2014 for cases of treason, espionage, and assassination of political leaders. There had already been accusations of extrajudicial execution occurring.

The Luhansk People's Republic introduced the death penalty on 26 September 2014 in cases of homosexual rape.

== Polling ==
Despite the fact that nearly all nations in Europe do not have capital punishment, polling has found some have majority support for the practice and its return.

In 2015, a poll found that 70% of Estonians are in favour of the death penalty, an increase of support from then 62% in a 2010 poll.

In 2020, a Ipsos/Sopra Steria survey found that 55% of French people support reintroduction of the death penalty, an increase.

In April 2021, a poll found that 54% of Britons said they would support reinstating the death penalty for those convicted of terrorism in the United Kingdom. About a quarter (23%) of respondents said they would be opposed.

Hungary (76%) and Serbia (58%) have majorities in support for the death penalty.

== See also ==
- Use of capital punishment by country
- Capital punishment abolitionism
- European Court of Human Rights
- European Convention on Human Rights
- Human rights in Europe
