= Capital punishment in the Soviet Union =

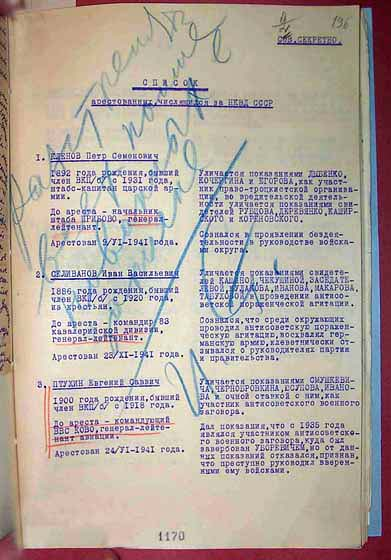
Lavrentiy Beria's proposal of 29 January 1942 to execute 46 generals. Joseph Stalin's resolution: "Shoot all named in the list. – J. St."

Capital punishment in the Soviet Union was a legal penalty for most of the country's existence. The claimed legal basis for capital punishment was Article 22 of the Fundamental Principles of Criminal Legislation, which stated that the death penalty was permitted "as an exceptional measure of punishment, until its complete abolition".

According to Western estimates, in the early 1980s Soviet courts passed around 2,000 death sentences every year, of which two-thirds were commuted to prison terms. A 1991 Helsinki Watch report stated that in January of that year the Soviet Union for the first time published capital punishment data. It was disclosed that, in 1990, 445 individuals were given the death sentence, 195 people were executed and 29 death sentences were commuted. Execution took the form of a gunshot to the back of the head. Following a 1935 decision made by the Central Executive Committee and publicized in the newspaper Izvestiia, minors as young as 12 years old could legally be punished with the death penalty.

== History ==
During the Second All-Russian Congress of Soviets of Workers' and Soldiers' Deputies in November 1917, the government of Soviet Russia decreed the abolition of the death penalty. In February 1918, the death penalty was reinstated. Hangings and shootings were very extensively employed by the Bolsheviks as part of their Red Terror.

The first person to be sentenced to death by a Soviet court was Alexey Schastny, Admiral of the Baltic Fleet, on 21 June 1918. Conditional death sentences were also delivered in the early 1920s. Decrees issued in 1922, 1923 and 1933, repealed in 1959, provided police with the right to carry out summary executions. Capital punishment was abolished on 26 May 1947, but reinstated in 1950. Capital punishment was extended to cases of aggravated murder in 1954.

== Capital crimes ==
In addition to treason, espionage, terrorism and murder, capital punishment was imposed for economic crimes, such as "the pilfering of state or public property in especially large amounts". The hijacking of an aircraft became a capital crime in 1973.

=== Economic crimes ===
Capital punishment for crimes against state and public property was reintroduced in 1961. During that year two foreign currency traders, Rokotov and Faibishenko, were retroactively sentenced to death and executed. By 1987, it is estimated that over 6,000 people had been executed for economic crimes. The death penalty was generally applied if the crime involved sums exceeding about 200,000 rubles, though there was no fixed threshold.

Several officials were executed for economic crimes as part of Yuri Andropov's anti-corruption campaign. Vladimir I. Rytov, a deputy Minister of Fisheries, was executed in 1982 for smuggling millions of dollars' worth of caviar to the West. The director of Gastronom 1, one of Moscow's most prominent gourmet food stores, was executed in 1984 for corruption. The chairman of Technopromexport was executed in 1984 for "systematically taking big bribes". Berta Borodkina, head of the restaurants and canteens department in Gelendzhik, was sentenced to death for receiving US$758,500 in bribes.

Applications of the laws on economic crimes were criticized as both creating and promoting antisemitic outcomes. International bodies such as the ICJ argued and provided evidence of an overemphasis on Jewish people's involvement in these crimes despite their being a minority population in the Soviet Union. In 1964 The New York Times noted that "60 percent of the 160 persons executed for economic crimes since 1961 were Jews." Nikita Khrushchev, leader of the Soviet Union, denied these criticisms had any merit.

== Capital punishment in the Post-Soviet states ==
- Armenia
- Azerbaijan
- Belarus
- Estonia
- (Georgia (country)) Georgia
- Kazakhstan
- Kyrgyzstan
- Latvia
- Lithuania
- Moldova
- Russia
- Tajikistan
- Turkmenistan
- Ukraine
- Uzbekistan

== See also ==
- Capital punishment in Russia
- Capital punishment in Belarus
- Capital punishment in Ukraine
- Capital punishment in Cuba
- Capital punishment in Vietnam
- Capital punishment in the United States
