= Anatoli Neželski =

Estonian serial killer

- Born: 22 January 1951 (age 75)
- Conviction: Murder x3
- Penalty: 15 years imprisonment

Details
- Victims: 3
- Span of crimes: 1994–1996
- Country: Estonia
- State: Harju
- Date apprehended: 17 March 1998

Anatoli Neželski (born 22 January 1951) is an Estonian serial killer who murdered three people in Tallinn between 1994 and 1996. After Neželski was found guilty, convicted and given 15 years imprisonment, he was subsequently released in 2013 after serving out the entirety of his sentence.

== Early life ==
Neželski was born in 1951. In his youth, he was employed on fishing boats and travelled around various seaports, before changing professions to work in a plywood and furniture factory. While employed at the factory, Neželski, who had a lifelong interest in firearms, manufactured himself a pistol which he would later use in the killings. Around this time, he married a local woman, but the couple soon divorced, with his ex-wife describing Neželski as a religious fanatic who attended the Alexander Nevsky Cathedral every morning so he could pray to God. After their divorce, Neželski began working as a security guard at a shop in Priisle, but also served as a druzhinnik whenever possible.

== Murders and flight ==
As his financial situation gradually started to worsen, Neželski decided that he should turn to robberies to survive, using his experience as a druzhinnik and knowledge of police procedures to avoid getting caught. On 27 June 1994, he went to his ex-wife's home on Läänemere tee in Lasnamäe and broke inside. There, he threw out her new boyfriend, 26-year-old Gennadi, who was visiting at the time. When Gennadi attempted to get back inside, Neželski grabbed his self-made pistol and killed him on the spot.

On 31 August 1994, Neželski attempted to rob the Antonius bureau de change on Luise Street, but was met with resistance from the head manager, 31-year-old Jüri. The two men exchanged gunfire, with Anatoli suffering injuries to the leg and Jüri being killed on the spot with two revolver shots. Neželski was unable to steal any money from the venue, as he was forced to flee from the crime scene.

The final crime occurred two years later, on 7 March 1996. On that day, Neželski entered the main building of the Hansabank on Liivalaia Street, and attempted to extort the 48-year-old Rita, an accountant for AS Pesutehnika, for all her money. When the woman retaliated, she was shot with a Chinese-manufactured TT pistol which her killer had recently bought from a market. He then stole a bag containing a total of 49,000 krooni and went into hiding, first staying with an acquaintance on Nisu Street, whom he repaid by repairing his apartment, using the stolen money to pay off his debts and living expenses. Over the next two years, Neželski avoided capture by constantly changing his hideouts and stealing food from stores in order to survive.

== Imprisonment and release ==
On the morning of 17 March 1998, Anatoli Neželski was detained on Kauba Street while collecting bottles. Shortly after his capture, Neželski readily confessed to all of his crimes, indicating how, why and where he had committed the respective killings. He was convicted and sentenced to 15 years imprisonment for all three crimes, in addition to being required to pay 70,000 krooni in damages to the victims' family members. The reason for his relatively short sentence was due to a loophole in Estonian law at the time: in 1994, the harshest penalty available was the death penalty and there were no life sentences, and the longest available being the 15 year-sentence. When he was captured in 1998, the death penalty had been abolished and the highest available penalty he could be given was the 15-year sentence.

In 2009, after 11 years behind bars, Neželski applied for early release, citing that he was repentant about his wrongdoings and wanted to live and work to redeem himself. In 2012, Neželski withdrew his requests for early release from the Harju County Court, as his sentence was nearing its completion by that time. In March 2013, he was released from prison, and now lives freely in Tallinn.

== See also ==
- List of serial killers by country
