= Anatoly Slivko =

Soviet serial killer (1938–1989)

Anatoly Slivko Анатолий Сливко
- Slivko, pictured at his trial in 1986
- Born: Anatoly Yemelianovich Slivko; 28 December 1938; Izerbash, Dagestan ASSR, Russian SFSR, USSR
- Died: 16 September 1989 (age 50); Novocherkassk prison, Novocherkassk, Russian SFSR, USSR
- Cause of death: Execution by shooting
- Spouse: Lyudmila Slivko (m. 1963)
- Children: 2
- Status: Executed
- Motive: Sexual sadism; Possession; Necrophilia
- Conviction: Murder with aggravating circumstances
- Penalty: Death

Details
- Victims: 7+
- Span of crimes: 2 June 1964 – 23 July 1985
- Country: Soviet Union
- Date apprehended: 28 December 1985

Anatoly Yemelianovich Slivko (Russian: Анатолий Емельянович Сливко; 28 December 1938 – 16 September 1989) was a Soviet serial killer and necrophile who sexually assaulted, murdered, and mutilated seven boys in and around Nevinnomyssk, Stavropol Krai, Russian SFSR, between 1964 and 1985. He is also known to have sexually assaulted at least 36 other victims.

Slivko's murder victims were aged between 11 and 15. All were deceived into participating in home movies ostensibly reenacting the scene of a partisan soldier executed by Nazi soldiers in which the boy would be hanged. Upon rendering his victim unconscious, Slivko would sexually assault, then murder and dismember his victim before setting the body alight. The entire routine would invariably be filmed, photographed, and documented in diaries to fuel Slivko's pyrophilia and erotic fantasies.

The routine of hanging, mutilation and burning enacted by Slivko was an attempt to recreate a traffic accident involving the violent death of a teenage boy he had witnessed in 1961 which had sexually aroused him and awakened his paraphilias.

Sentenced to death in 1986, Slivko was executed by shooting on 16 September 1989.

== Early life ==
=== Childhood ===
Anatoly Yemelianovich Slivko was born on 28 December 1938 in the town of Izerbash, Dagestan ASSR, Russian SFSR. He was the oldest of two children born to impoverished parents.

At the time of Slivko's birth, Ukraine was in the grip of a famine caused by Joseph Stalin's forced collectivization of agriculture, from which Soviet Dagestan was not immune. The marriage between Slivko's parents was fraught: both parents frequently argued. Furthermore, his father was an alcoholic. Slivko was an intelligent, but sickly child who suffered from insomnia and several childhood illnesses. He was also a classic loner, and later recalled his childhood as blighted by instability, hunger, war, and poverty.

When the Soviet Union entered the Second World War, Slivko's father was conscripted into the Red Army. Slivko himself witnessed many atrocities committed by German troops following their invasion of the Soviet Union, including their invasion of his own home in 1943. One of his most graphic wartime memories was of seeking shelter with four other children in a cemetery to escape German bombing raids, only to be pushed aside by these children, who were repulsed by his emaciated appearance. According to Slivko, as he crouched into a ball, he observed the mutilated remains of a woman and a horse strewn across a nearby street.

=== Adolescence ===
Slivko performed poorly academically. Although intelligent, his lack of commitment to his studies and propensity to daydream in class resulted in his achieving average grades. When he reached puberty, Slivko discovered he was homosexual; he also discovered he suffered from erectile dysfunction. Both discoveries deeply shamed Slivko, who kept his sexuality and sexual dysfunction a secret from his family and few close friends.

==== Military service ====
In an effort to escape his humble origins, Slivko applied for a scholarship at Moscow State University shortly after his graduation from school in 1956, although he failed the entrance exam. Shortly thereafter, he began his compulsory military service and was deployed in the Russian Far East. He was frequently subjected to the mockery and ridicule of his comrades—many of whom derided his timid and submissive personality. His superiors concluded Slivko was "incompatible" with military life, and he was discharged from the Soviet Army—officially due to health issues—in 1960, prior to the completion of his service.

== Relocation to Stavropol ==
In 1961, Slivko relocated from Izerbash to Stavropol Krai, where he found employment as a telephone engineer. His younger sister later relocated to the same city, obtaining employment in a local factory. In late 1962, Slivko's sister—having become concerned as to her brother's introverted lifestyle and lack of interaction with women—introduced him to a young colleague of hers named Lyudmila. The two began dating and married in a modest ceremony the following summer. Shortly after their wedding, the couple relocated to the city of Nevinnomyssk, where they soon established reputations as upstanding members of the community.

According to Slivko, although he cared for his wife, his sexuality obscured any physical attraction to her and his erectile dysfunction limited their intercourse to brief episodes of what he termed "quick, humiliating" coupling. On one occasion, he did seek medical help to overcome his inability to sustain an erection in the presence of a female, although the sight of a young nurse discreetly laughing at his predicament meant he never again sought any form of professional advice.

Slivko later admitted to investigators he and Lyudmila had engaged in intercourse no more than ten times throughout their seventeen-year relationship, and never after the birth of their second child.

=== Erotic fantasies ===
In 1961, Slivko witnessed a traffic accident in which a drunken motorcyclist swerved onto a pavement and into a group of pedestrians, fatally injuring a boy in his early teens who was wearing a Young Pioneers uniform. For reasons Slivko would later insist he never could explain, this scene had sexually excited him, triggering a powerful orgasm. (Note: Other eyewitnesses to this accident would later remark Slivko "seemed to be in a trance" as he "crouched and watched [the accident] from the sidewalk.") He later recalled the accident vividly: "The boy had experienced convulsions in his death throes as the smell of gasoline and fire permeated the air ... That boy looked so helpless, especially in his uniform. It reminded me of how I felt inside myself after a childhood of pain and suffering. Each time he cried out in agony, I became more excited. [By the time of the boy's death], I became oblivious to everyone else apart from that boy."

Having achieved orgasm, Slivko walked approximately twenty yards towards a nearby bus shelter where he sat and continued to stare at the deceased teenager, who remained pinioned beneath the motorcycle as emergency services arrived at the scene. According to Slivko, he experienced arousal, elation and a sense of empowerment as he sat and contemplated the suffering the teenager had endured before his death.

Slivko would later describe his witnessing the traffic accident as one of the most pivotal moments in his life. Prior to witnessing the accident, he had repressed his sexuality; after witnessing the accident, he developed an overwhelming desire to engage in physical sexual relations with young males. Furthermore, the sight of blood on the teenager's shoes further compounded the shoe fetish he had already developed, and he began incorporating boys' footwear into his masturbatory fantasies.

== Youth club ==
Within months of witnessing this traffic accident, Slivko established a youth club in Nevinnomyssk. Ostensibly, the club was established to encourage local boys to participate in Young Pioneer activities, although Slivko also soon began using the club as a means of befriending boys and developing methods to gain their trust. (Note: In interviews following his arrest, Slivko insisted he had initially attempted to suppress the urge to reenact the traffic accident, although the urge became too constant and potent, and he soon surrendered to his will.)

This first club was destroyed in an act of arson approximately one year after its establishment. Allegedly, the perpetrator was one of the boys who attended the club and whom Slivko had either mistreated or molested. No criminal charges were filed. Shortly thereafter, Slivko established a new club, which he named Chergid. This youth club was based three miles from his home.

Slivko's youth club activities aroused no suspicion; the parents of boys who attended the club regularly bestowed praise upon him for devoting attention to their children and steering them away from trouble. Slivko regularly took his young charges on hiking and hill climbing expeditions, with the expeditions frequently lasting for days at a time. Articles relating to the club's activities frequently appeared in local newspapers and radio broadcasts. Slivko also granted several interviews with local television outlets and even received commendation from local Communist Party officials for his ongoing efforts to educate, entertain and morally nurture Nevinnomyssk's youth. In 1977, he was elected Deputy of the City Council and awarded the title of Honoured Teacher of the Soviet Union.

=== Hanging experiments ===
By June 1963, Slivko had devised a routine whereby he could physically relive the erotic fantasies sparked by the 1961 traffic accident: once or twice a year, he would form a close friendship with a boy at the youth club typically aged between 11 and 15, but never older than 17. (Note: Following his arrest, Slivko stated to investigators he never selected a youth older than 17 both because the boy killed in the 1961 traffic accident which had sparked his fantasies had been in his early teens, and out of concerns regarding the victim's physical strength.) The boy would be short for his age and would be wearing a Young Pioneers uniform – just like the boy Slivko had seen die in the traffic accident. Slivko would gain the boy's confidence and tell him of an experiment he knew which involved a controlled hanging to stretch the spine, and that he would be required to reenact the scene of a partisan executed by Nazi soldiers for his youth club as Slivko filmed the hanging, after which, the boy was assured, Slivko would revive him from his state of unconsciousness.

Prior to each boy undertaking this "experiment", Slivko would harmlessly rehearse the hanging scene with his intended victim in order to gain his confidence; he would then purchase a new uniform for the victim to wear and shine his shoes before enacting the hanging. In addition, to prevent any vomiting, the victim was required not to eat for several hours before the experiment. Once the boy was anaesthetized via inhaling ether, had placed the noose around his own neck and was unconscious, Slivko would strip him naked, caress and fondle him, arrange the body in suggestive positions, and repeatedly masturbate – frequently onto the boy's shoes. This entire process would invariably be filmed by Slivko on one of his 16mm cameras and retained to fuel his erotic fantasies. To allay any parental concern as to their sons' participation in these home movies, their parents were informed Slivko – known in the community to have created several amateur documentaries with his personal camera – was to film these videos on the stage at his club. (Note: Although the parents of many of Slivko's initial victims duped into partaking in these home movies were aware the films were to depict reconstructions of Second World War skirmishes between partisan fighters and Nazi soldiers, none of these parents were aware these home movies involved the actual hanging—controlled or otherwise—of their sons.)

Although many of the boys Slivko initially persuaded to participate in these home movies were restrained and hanged inside or within the vicinity of Chergid, by the mid-1960s, he had begun to persuade his victims to participate in his home movies in increasingly rural locations—often without their parents' knowledge.

== Murders ==
Over the course of 22 years, Slivko persuaded forty-three boys to take part in this contrived experiment. In thirty-six cases, following his established ritual of photography, filming and repeated masturbation, Slivko revived these boys. Cautioned by Slivko into silence, these individuals resumed their lives unaware of what had happened to them whilst they had been unconscious. However, in seven cases, Slivko's behaviour became violent: once these victims were unconscious, he extensively dismembered their bodies, poured gasoline on their limbs and torso, and set the remains on fire to remind himself of the traffic accident which had sparked his arousal. Slivko typically retained the victim's shoes as a memento, as well as the photographs and films which he developed in a home laboratory. In addition, Slivko meticulously recorded details of each hanging—fatal or otherwise—in his diaries. The shoes, pictures and films served as stimuli for Slivko's masturbatory fantasies for months or years until he needed fresher stimuli and killed again.

On 2 June 1964, Slivko killed his first victim, a 15-year-old runaway named Nikolai Dobryshev. Slivko claimed this particular victim was killed unintentionally, as he had been unable to revive Dobryshev upon completion of his routine of filming, photography, and masturbation, although he later admitted in one interview with a psychiatrist that the teenager's death triggered a greater sense of arousal within him than his previous, non-fatal hangings. Nonetheless, the sense of shock at the death of this victim drove Slivko to dismember the boy's body and discard the remains in the Kuban river. He also destroyed the film and photographs he had taken of this particular victim, although he retained the boy's shoes. In May 1965, Slivko befriended his second victim, Aleksei Kovalenko, at his youth club. This victim was killed intentionally, with Slivko retaining all footage and imagery of the hanging, molestation and mutilation. Kovalenko was reported missing, although his parents were informed by police their child was a runaway.

Killing those children became like work to Slivko, in a sense. He had to keep those two very diverse parts of his personality apart from each other or else one of them might have brought the other down, so to speak. Whenever he ventured too close to crossing over between the decent family man version of himself and the sick and twisted psychopath ... that was when he was at his most vulnerable.

— Criminal psychologist, reflecting on Slivko's mindset and ability to separate his recidivism from his respectable public persona.

Eight years later, on 14 November 1973, 15-year-old Aleksandr Nesmeyanov disappeared in Nevinnomyssk. Nesmeyanov—another member of Chergid—had recently befriended Slivko prior to his disappearance. Slivko actively participated in the search for Nesmeyanov in the weeks following his murder; printing missing person posters and mobilizing ground searches which he ensured did not cover the murder location.

Two years later, on 11 May 1975, another member of Slivko's youth club, 11-year-old Andrei Pogasyan also disappeared. The boy was last seen by a neighbour, who informed police that Pogasyan had told him he was to participate in a "film in the forest," although the boy did not mention Slivko by name. Pogasyan's mother did inform investigators that Slivko had shot a partisan film in a nearby forest in which her son had previously participated; however, as the police already knew Slivko had won awards for other, more innocuous films, he was eliminated as a suspect following brief questioning in which he admitted the boy was a member of his youth club but denied any involvement in his disappearance.

In 1980, Slivko killed his fifth victim, 13-year-old Sergey Fatniev. He was also an active member of Chergid, and by the time Slivko committed this murder, his sadism and lust had escalated to a degree in which he specifically rearranged his victim's dismembered body and shoes before his camera in order to fuel future masturbatory fantasies. His diary entries denoting Fatniev's murder, dismemberment and the burning of his body and clothing also indicate his lack of "disgust and shame" at his actions. The next victim was Vyacheslav Khovistik, aged 15, whom Slivko killed in the autumn of 1984.

On 23 July 1985, Slivko killed his final victim, 13-year-old Sergey Pavlov, who disappeared after telling a neighbour he was meeting the leader of Chergid to participate in a home movie. Although police informed Pavlov's mother her son was a runaway, his parents remained unconvinced. Both questioned Slivko, who denied any involvement; however, his mother's questioning of fellow Chergid members revealed several boys had participated in hanging experiments to stretch their spines in efforts to stimulate growth at Slivko's insistence, and that the boys had invariably lost consciousness.

== Arrest ==
Following Pavlov's disappearance, a local prosecutor named Tamara Languyeva began actively investigating the boy's absence. Her enquiries lasted several months, and by November 1985 Languyeva had discovered that several other boys who had attended the same youth club had also disappeared over the course of several years – often, like Pavlov, having informed their relatives they were to participate in home movies filmed by Slivko.

Although Languyeva found no evidence of anything illegal in the way the club actually operated, her questioning of several boys did reveal that many members had agreed to being hanged into unconsciousness in controlled experiments by Slivko as part of a repeated ritual for his homemade partisan movies. Many of these current and former members of the youth club had also suffered "temporary amnesia" following their revival.

The severed footwear of two of Slivko's murder victims. Slivko retained the shoes of his victims to incorporate into his masturbatory fantasies.

=== Evidence retrieval ===
At the recommendation of Languyeva, a city prosecutor authorised a formal search of Slivko's home and youth club in December 1985. Although little incriminating evidence was recovered at Slivko's Stavropol home, a search of a locked darkroom at his youth club revealed numerous photographs and films depicting the hanging, molestation and dismemberment of his victims. Also recovered were numerous knives, axes and coils of rope and rubber hose in addition to paraphernalia attesting to his shoe fetish, including several pairs of boys' shoes and boots which had been completely sawn through at mid-foot. (Note: Several of Slivko's home movies depict him severing through the metatarsal bones of his victims with a saw as their feet remained in their polished shoes. On occasion, the footwear would be burned; typically, the footwear—severed or otherwise—would be retained.)

==== Confession ====
Confronted with the evidence recovered from his darkroom, Slivko began confessing to seven murders and thirty-six non-fatal hangings on 28 December. He blamed his crimes on distress brought upon him by sexual frustration and emphasized the primary purpose of his retaining the snuff material and paraphernalia was to both fuel his erotic fantasies via masturbational outlets and to relieve internal tension. Slivko also claimed that, initially, he had hoped that his retaining the photographs and films of his fatal hangings would suffice to prevent a resurfacing of the desire to commit future homicides, although as time passed, the intervals between the urge to murder and dismember a new victim gradually decreased. His murder victims, he stated, had all been aged between eleven and fifteen, and he had gradually learned via the methodology of his successive crimes what he termed "valuable lessons" to minimise or destroy any incriminating evidence actually linking his murders to him.

In February and March 1986, Slivko led investigators to the dismembered and buried bodies of six of his victims, although he was unable to locate the body of his first victim, whom he had discarded in the Kuban river over twenty years previously. He was formally charged with all seven murders, in addition to seven counts of sexual abuse and seven counts of necrophilia and remanded in custody, to await trial.

== Trial ==
Slivko's trial was held in Nevinnomyssk in June 1986; he pleaded not guilty to the charges—claiming all seven deaths were accidental. He was found guilty of all charges and sentenced to death later the same month and was transferred to Novocherkassk prison to await execution. Slivko appealed against his conviction to the Supreme Court of Russia, but this appeal was rejected.

=== Death row interview ===
At the request of a Rostov-based detective named Viktor Burakov, Slivko was asked by the police to provide an insight into the minds of serial murderers just weeks prior to his execution. Slivko agreed to this request and consented to both face-to-face interviews and handwritten correspondence with investigators, who were actively seeking insight into the mind of a then-unidentified serial killer active in and around the Rostov Oblast known as the Forest Strip Killer, who had killed a minimum of twenty-nine victims by the time of their initiating contact with Slivko.

Slivko did provide investigators with a deep insight into how offenders such as himself were able to function in society without detection or suspicion, the general "rules" created insofar as to how their crimes were to be committed to achieving their desired outcome, and advice as to how to prevent the emergence of future offenders such as himself in Soviet society, which included his suggestion that Soviet schools should provide adolescent students with greater knowledge and acceptance of sexuality, adding in one letter: "If I had had [knowledge of sexual perversions], I might have gone to a doctor as soon as the first abnormal symptoms appeared." However, Slivko knew little of the investigators' ongoing manhunt in the Rostov Oblast, and much of the actual advice he provided on the specific case would prove to be incompatible or incorrect.

At the time of the investigators' final death row interview with Slivko, his scheduled execution was to take place within hours. According to procurator Issa Kostoyev, upon conclusion of their final meeting he deceived Slivko into the belief they were to convene at a later date by shaking his hand and stating, "Next time, we'll talk in greater detail." The then-unidentified Rostov serial killer, Andrei Chikatilo, was arrested in November 1990 and would be convicted of killing fifty-two women and children in October 1992.

== Execution ==
On 16 September 1989, just hours after his final interview with Kostoyev, Slivko was taken from his death row cell to a soundproofed room and executed with a single gunshot to the back of the head.

== See also ==
- Capital punishment in the Soviet Union
- Crime in the Soviet Union
- List of Russian serial killers
- List of serial killers by number of victims
- Pyrophilia

== Bibliography ==
- Clarkson, Wensley (2021). Serial Killers of Russia: Case Files from the World's Deadliest Nation. London: Welbeck Publishing. ISBN 978-1-787-39602-9.
- Conradi, Peter (1994) [1992]. The Red Ripper: Inside the Mind of Russia's Most Brutal Serial Killer. London: True Crime. ISBN 0-440-21603-6.
- Cullen, Robert (1994) [1993]. The Killer Department: Detective Viktor Burakov's Eight-Year Hunt for the Most Savage Serial Killer of Our Times. London: Orion Media. ISBN 1-85797-210-4.
- Hall, Susan (2020). The World Encyclopedia of Serial Killers: Volume Three, M–S. Denver, Colorado: WildBlue Press. ISBN 978-1-952-22533-8.
- Kalman, Robert (2014). Born to Kill in the USSR. Altona, Manitoba: Friesen Press. ISBN 978-1-460-22731-2.
- Lane, Brian (1994) [1991]. The Butchers: A Casebook of Macabre Crimes and Forensic Detection. Kettering: Index. ISBN 978-1-852-27297-5.
- Lawson, John (2015). Murder Most Moscow: True Stories of Russia's Worst Serial Killers. Los Angeles: CreateSpace. ISBN 978-1-514-67009-5.
- Lourie, Richard (1993). Hunting the Devil: The Pursuit, Capture and Confession of the Most Savage Serial Killer in History. London: Grafton. ISBN 0-06-017717-9.
- Ramsland, Katherine (2013). The Devil's Dozen: 12 Notorious Serial Killers Caught by Cutting-Edge Forensics. New York City: Berkley Publishing Group. ISBN 978-0-425-27077-6.
- Rodrigues, Aldo (2005). The Worst People in History. London: Futura. ISBN 978-0-557-15108-0.
- Toates, Frederick; Coschug-Toates, Olga (2022). Understanding Sexual Serial Killing. Cambridge: Cambridge University Press. ISBN 978-1-316-51759-8.
- Wallace, Bill (2013). Mass Killers: Compelled to Destroy. Australia: Canary Press. ISBN 978-1-907-79590-9.
