= Capital punishment in Georgia =

Capital punishment in Georgia may refer to:

- Capital punishment in Georgia (country)
- Capital punishment in Georgia (U.S. state)
