= Akhmed Khaybullayev =

Russian footballer

Personal information
- Full name: Akhmed Aligadzhiyevich Khaybullayev
- Date of birth: 29 March 1985 (age 41)
- Place of birth: Izberbash, Dagestan, Russian SFSR
- Height: 1.88 m (6 ft 2 in)
- Position: Goalkeeper

Senior career*
Years	Team	Apps	(Gls)
2001–2002	FC Anzhi Makhachkala	0	(0)
2006	FC Dagdizel Kaspiysk	6	(0)
2006	FC Baltika-2 Kaliningrad	20	(0)
2007	FC Anzhi Makhachkala	0	(0)
2007	FC Baltika-2 Kaliningrad	13	(0)
2008	FC Volga Tver	34	(0)
2009	FC Sheksna Cherepovets	31	(0)
2010–2011	FC Volga Tver	25	(0)
2011–2014	FC Dagdizel Kaspiysk	59	(0)
2016–2017	FC Legion-Dynamo Makhachkala	8	(0)
- * Club domestic league appearances and goals

Akhmed Aligadzhiyevich Khaybullayev (Russian: Ахмед Алигаджиевич Хайбуллаев; born 29 March 1985) is a former Russian professional football player.

== Club career ==
He made his debut for the senior squad of FC Anzhi Makhachkala on 13 June 2007 in the Russian Cup game against FC Rotor Volgograd.
