= Izberbash =

Town in the Republic of Dagestan, Russia

Izberbash Избербаш
- Town

Other transcription(s)
  - Dargwa: Избор
  - Kumyk: Йизбирбаш
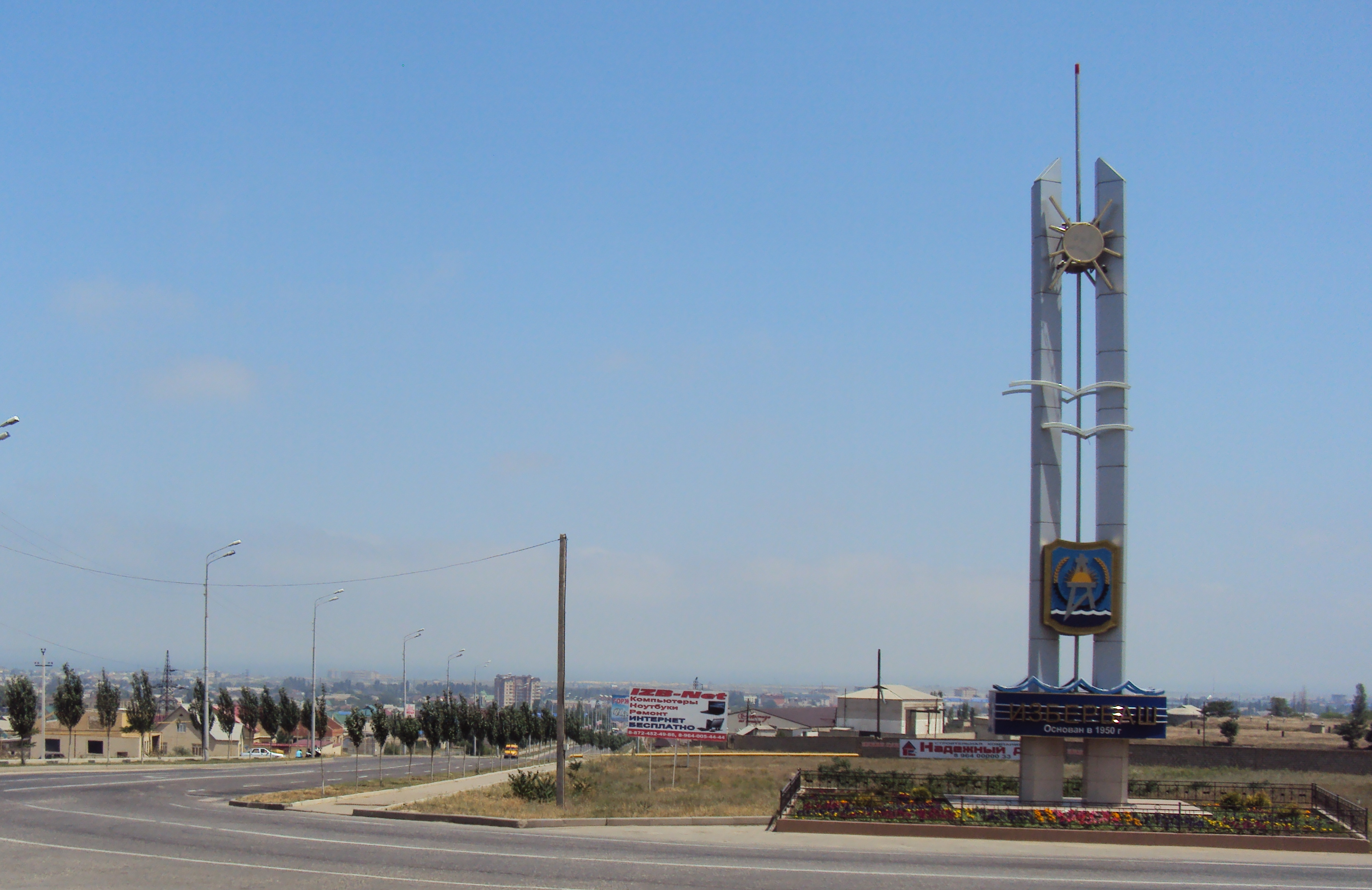
- Welcome sign at the entrance to the town

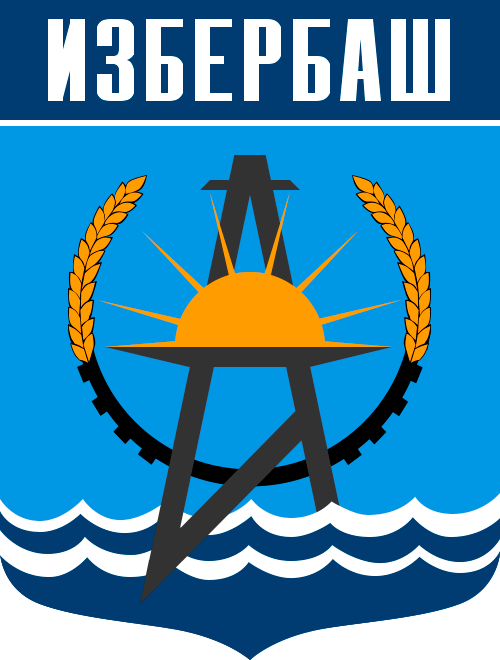
- Coat of arms
- Interactive map of Izberbash
- Location of Izberbash Izberbash (Republic of Dagestan)
- Coordinates: 42°33′48″N 47°51′49″E
- Country: Russia
- Federal subject: Dagestan
- Founded: 1932
- Town status since: 1949

Area
  - Total: 22.55 km^{2} (8.71 sq mi)
- Elevation: 0 m (0 ft)

Population (2010 Census)
  - Total: 55,646
  - Estimate (2021): 55,996 (+0.6%)
  - Rank: 297th in 2010
  - Density: 2,468/km^{2} (6,391/sq mi)

Administrative status
  - Subordinated to: Town of Izberbash
  - Capital of: Town of Izberbash

Municipal status
  - Urban okrug: Izberbash Urban Okrug
  - Capital of: Izberbash Urban Okrug
- Time zone: UTC+3 (MSK)
- Postal code: 368500–368502
- Dialing code: +7 87245
- OKTMO ID: 82715000001
- Website: www.mo-izberbash.ru

Izberbash (Russian: Изберба́ш; Dargwa: Избир; Kumyk: Йизбирба́ш, Yizbirbaş) is a town in the Republic of Dagestan, Russia, located on the coast of the Caspian Sea 56 kilometers (35 mi) southeast of Makhachkala, the capital of the republic. Population: 55,646 (2010 census); 39,365 (2002 census); 28,122 (1989 Soviet census).

== History ==
It was founded in 1932 as an oil extraction settlement. Town status was granted to it in 1949.

On 1 October 2024 the mayor of Izberbash, Magomed Isakov, was arrested by the Russian government for accepting a 3.9 million ruble (US$40,902.5) bribe "for not the commission of actions related to the abolition of the permit for the construction of a house" from a contractor, facing a 15 year sentence.

== Administrative and municipal status ==
Within the framework of administrative divisions, it is incorporated as the Town of Izberbash—an administrative unit with the status equal to that of the districts. As a municipal division, the Town of Izberbash is incorporated as Izberbash Urban Okrug.

== Demographics ==
Ethnic groups in the city administrative area (2002 census):

- Dargins (65.4%)
- Kumyks (14.4%)
- Lezgins (7.3%)
- Russians (5.1%)
- Avars (2.8%)
- Laks (2.0%)
- Azerbaijanis (1.0%)

Ethnic groups in 2021:

- Dargins (66.1%)
- Kumyks (15.7%)
- Lezgins (10.0%)
- Russians (2.1%)
- Avars (2.6%)
- Laks (1.7%)
- Tabasarans (0.8%)

== Education ==
- M. M. Medzhidov Professional and Pedagogical College

== Geography ==
=== Climate ===
Izberbash has a cold semi-arid climate (Köppen climate classification: BSk).

Climate data for Izberbash
Month	Jan	Feb	Mar	Apr	May	Jun	Jul	Aug	Sep	Oct	Nov	Dec	Year
Mean daily maximum °C (°F)	3.9 (39.0)	4.3 (39.7)	7.7 (45.9)	14.5 (58.1)	21.1 (70.0)	26.3 (79.3)	29.2 (84.6)	28.8 (83.8)	24.0 (75.2)	17.7 (63.9)	11.3 (52.3)	6.5 (43.7)	16.3 (61.3)
Daily mean °C (°F)	0.8 (33.4)	1.3 (34.3)	4.5 (40.1)	10.5 (50.9)	17.0 (62.6)	22.1 (71.8)	25.2 (77.4)	24.7 (76.5)	20.1 (68.2)	14.1 (57.4)	8.2 (46.8)	3.6 (38.5)	12.7 (54.8)
Mean daily minimum °C (°F)	−2.2 (28.0)	−1.6 (29.1)	1.3 (34.3)	6.6 (43.9)	12.9 (55.2)	17.9 (64.2)	21.2 (70.2)	20.6 (69.1)	16.3 (61.3)	10.6 (51.1)	5.2 (41.4)	0.8 (33.4)	9.1 (48.4)
Average precipitation mm (inches)	23 (0.9)	31 (1.2)	22 (0.9)	20 (0.8)	29 (1.1)	24 (0.9)	26 (1.0)	24 (0.9)	40 (1.6)	46 (1.8)	33 (1.3)	32 (1.3)	350 (13.7)
Source: Climate-Data.org

== Notable people ==
People from Izberbash:

- Viktor Bolshov (born 1939), Soviet high jumper
- Milana Dadasheva (born 1995), Russian wrestler
- Mukhtar Gusengadzhiyev (born 1964), Russian circus actor
- Akhmed Khaybullayev (born 1985), Russian footballer
- Anatoly Slivko (1938–1989), Soviet serial killer
