= Izberbash Pedagogical College =

M. M. Medzhidov Professional and Pedagogical College
- Пофессионально-педагогический колледж имени М. М. Меджидова
- Former name: Temir-Khan-Shurinsky Real School (1880-1892)
- Type: State Budgetary Educational Institution of Secondary Vocational Education
- Established: 8 September 1880; 145 years ago
- Director: Adzieva Salikhat Magomedsalamovna
- Location: Izberbash, Russia; 42°33′45″N 47°52′31″E
- Campus: urban
- Language: Russian
- Website: ppk-m.dagestanschool.ru

Izberbash Pedagogical College (Russian: Избербашский педагогический колледж), officially designated the M. M. Medzhidov Professional and Pedagogical College, is among the oldest institutions of public education in Dagestan and served as the first center in the republic for the training of schoolteachers. It traces its origins to the Temir-Khan-Shura Real School (in present-day Buynaksk), which was established in 1880. The college functions as a state-funded institution of secondary vocational education and is in the city of Izberbash, Dagestan.

Its academic structure comprises three departments: music, art and graphics, and elementary education.

== History ==
=== Temir-Khan-Shura ===
The Temir-Khan-Shura Real School was officially opened on September 8, 1880, although its origins go back to 1878. In 1892, the institution was renamed the Provincial Real School of Temir-Khan-Shura, a title it carried until 1922. That year marked the inauguration of the First Dagestan State Pedagogical Technical School in Temir-Khan-Shura (present-day Buynaksk). This was the first specialized educational institution in the republic’s history, created to train teachers, provide them with teaching materials, and maintain a boarding facility. The school’s first graduating class completed their studies in May 1925, with 17 students receiving diplomas. Following the introduction of compulsory universal primary education in 1930, these graduates played an important role in putting the new policy into practice.

=== Buynaksk ===
In 1939, after the city was renamed Buynaksk, the institution itself became known as the Buynaksk Pedagogical College. It carried out this name until 1946, when it was redesignated as the First Dagestan Pedagogical College, a title it would hold for nearly three decades, until 1975.

=== Izberbash ===
In 1970, in the aftermath of a devastating earthquake in Dagestan, the First Dagestan Pedagogical College was relocated from Buynaksk to Izberbash. In 1973, after being transferred to the city of Izberbash, the Sergokalinsk Pedagogical School was renamed the Izberbash Pedagogical School. In 1976, it was merged with the Izberbash Pedagogical School, consolidating their resources and traditions. From 1975 until 1995, the institution functioned under this combined structure.

In 1995, the school was reorganized as the Izberbash Pedagogical College. Just three years later, by Decree of the State Council of the Republic of Dagestan No. 192, issued on August 19, 1998, the college was named in honor of Magomed Medzhidovich Medzhidov—a prominent Dagestani statesman, Honored Teacher of both the Russian Federation and the Dagestan ASSR, and a recipient of the Order of Lenin and the Order of the Red Banner of Labor. From that moment, it became known as the Izberbash Pedagogical College named after M. M. Medzhidov.

The institution underwent several further reorganizations in the years that followed. Between 2011 and 2014, it was officially titled the State Budgetary Educational Institution of Secondary Vocational Education named after M. M. M. Medzhidov. From 2014 to 2016, it was known as the Republican Pedagogical College named after M. M. Medzhidov. Finally, in 2016, it received its current designation as the State Budgetary Professional Educational Institution of the Republic of Dagestan “Professional and Pedagogical College named after M. M. Medzhidov.”

== Student body and graduates ==
In the 2022–2023 academic year, the college enrolled 1,321 students: 809 in full-time study (720 on a state-funded basis and 89 on a tuition-contract basis) and 512 in part-time study. In 2022, the institution graduated 143 mid-level specialists.

== Awards ==
In 1972, on its 50th anniversary and in recognition of its contributions to the training of public education personnel, the pedagogical school was awarded an Honorary Certificate by the Presidium of the Supreme Council of the Dagestan ASSR.

== Leaders of the organization ==
Years	Directors
1922–?	Abdurakhman, Isaev
?–?	Mutagadzhiev, Aziz
1948–1975	Balkovaya, Elizaveta Savvichna (1910–1981)
1975–1986	Dugrichilov, Magomed Murtuzalievich (1925–2003)
1988–2020	Vechedov, Davudbek Magomedovich (b. 1947)
2020–present	Adzieva, Salikhat Magomedsalamovna (b. 1971)

== Alumni ==
- Abdullaev A. M., Doctor of Philosophy
- Adjamatov, Atkay, writer
- Gadzhiev, Abakar, Rear Admiral
- Gadzhiev, Bulach, Honored Teacher of Schools of the RSFSR, People's Teacher of the USSR
- Gadzhieva, Sakinat, Doctor of Historical Sciences, Professor
- Gadzhiyev, Magomet, Hero of the Soviet Union of the Patriotic War of 1941-1945
- Daniyalov, Abdurakhman, Doctor of Historical Sciences, Cavalier of 5 Orders of Lenin
- Dzhalilova, Sabina, Candidate of Pedagogical Sciences
- Kapiev, Efendi, writer
- Kurbanov, Sumen, Hero of the Soviet Union of the Patriotic War of 1941–1945
- Magomedov, Shugaib Magomedovich, participant in the Patriotic War (1941–1945), Doctor of Historical Sciences, Professor
- Maksudov, Magomed, Honored Scientist of the RSFSR and the DASSR, Doctor of Medical Sciences
- Markov, Aleksey, writer
- Nuraev, N., power engineer
- Rashidov, Rashid, Dargin children's poet
- Razilov, R., former People's Commissar of Education of Dagestan
- Shilo, Svetlana Vladimirovna, member of the Union of Journalists of the Russian Federation
- Tikhilov, Said Murtuzalievich, member of the Union of Artists of the Republic of Dagestan, Honored Sculptor, essayist
- Tsvaygenbaum, Israel, artist
- Umalatova, Takhmina, Candidate of Art History, Honored Artist of the Republic of Dagestan
- Zakargaev, Zakarya, Member of the Union of Artists of the Russian Federation
