= Capital punishment in Albania =

Europe holds the greatest concentration of abolitionist states (blue). Map current as of 2022. Abolished for all offences Abolished in practice Retains capital punishment

Capital punishment in Albania was abolished for murder on 1 October 2000, but was still retained for treason and military offences. The reason for the abolition of the death penalty in Albania as well as in other European nations was the signing of Protocol No. 6 to the ECHR.

Under communism, the People's Socialist Republic of Albania performed around 6,000 executions between 1941 to 1985. The last execution of civilians, carried out after the election of the post-communist government, was a double hanging on 25 June 1992, where the perpetrators of the Libofshë massacre, brothers Dritëbardh and Josif Çuko, were hanged for five counts of murder in the public square in Fier.

In 2007 Albania ratified Protocol No. 13 to the ECHR, abolishing capital punishment under all circumstances and replacing it with life imprisonment in the statute books.
