= Second Optional Protocol to the International Covenant on Civil and Political Rights =

1989 international convention

Signatories to the Second Optional Protocol to the ICCPR: parties in dark green, signatories in light green, non-members in grey

The Second Optional Protocol to the International Covenant on Civil and Political Rights, aiming at the abolition of the death penalty, is a subsidiary agreement to the International Covenant on Civil and Political Rights. It was created on 15 December 1989 and entered into force on 11 July 1991. As of December 2024, the Optional Protocol has 92 state parties. The most recent country to ratify was Zambia, on 19 December 2024.

The Optional Protocol commits its members to the abolition of the death penalty within their borders, though Article 2.1 allows parties to make a reservation allowing execution "in time of war pursuant to a conviction for a most serious crime of a military nature committed during wartime" (Brazil, Chile, El Salvador). Cyprus, Malta and Spain initially made such reservations, and subsequently withdrew them. Azerbaijan and Greece still retain this reservation on their implementation of the protocol, despite both having banned the death penalty in all circumstances. (Greece has also ratified Protocol no.13 of the European Convention on Human Rights, which abolishes capital punishment for all crimes).

== See also ==
- First Optional Protocol to the International Covenant on Civil and Political Rights
- Capital punishment by country
- List of most recent executions by jurisdiction
