= People's assessors =

People's assessors system is a part of the judicial system of China.

== Selection ==
The court will determine the number of seats for assessors it needs with approval from the standing committee of the corresponding people's congress and the corresponding higher court. The assessors can be chosen from a pool of candidates from (1) a random selection of residents over 28 years old in the court's jurisdiction, which should be five times of the total seats as determined, (2) applications, and (3) recommendations by local communities. The eligibility of the candidates will be determined by judicial administrative organs in consultation with the police and the court. The judicial administrative organs will then select assessors from eligible candidates in consultation with the court. No more than one fifth of the seats can be filled by candidates via applications or recommendations. The list of assessors should be published five days before appointment for public scrutiny, then submit for approval from standing committee of corresponding people's congress. After an appointment made by the standing committee of corresponding people's congress, the assessors should swear an oath to uphold the constitution in public.

I, as a people's assessor of People's Republic of China, swear to be loyal of the country, of the people, and of the constitution and laws, to participate in the judicial process lawfully, to fulfill my duties faithfully, to upload honesty and integrity, to make impartial judgement, and to defend the justice of the society. 我是中华人民共和国人民陪审员，我宣誓：忠于国家，忠于人民，忠于宪法和法律，依法参加审判活动，忠实履行审判职责，廉洁诚信，秉公判断，维护社会公平正义

== Role ==
According to law, beside single-judge trials, people's assessors sit together in judicial panels with professional judges to try cases. Judicial panels should consist of one judge with two assessors or three judges with four assessors. Assessors cannot preside on the panel, but otherwise have equal rights as professional judges. Assessors cannot try cases alone like professional judges.
