= Capital punishment in Malta =

Capital punishment for murder was abolished in Malta in 1971. However, the death penalty continued to be part of the country's military code until it was fully abolished on 21 March 2000. Malta is a signatory of the Second Optional Protocol to the International Covenant on Civil and Political Rights that commits it to abolition of the death penalty within its borders. Malta has also ratified protocol 13 to the European Convention on Human Rights, that bans the death penalty in all circumstances.

Eighteen executions were carried out between 1876 and 1943. The last executions, on 5 July 1943, were of the brothers Karmnu and Guzeppi Zammit who were hanged for the murder of Spiru Grech. The last execution for a crime other than murder took place during World War II, when Carmelo Borg Pisani was hanged for treason on 28 November 1942. Pisani was a Maltese-born man who had joined the Italian National Fascist Party and taken Italian citizenship in 1940. He returned to Malta on an espionage mission in anticipation of an Axis invasion of the island.

The last person condemned to death was Anthony Patignott, on 1 October 1963, for the killing of Manwel Baldacchino. The Governor General of Malta, Maurice Henry Dorman, commuted Patignott's sentence to life imprisonment.

Public opinion in Malta is strongly opposed to the death penalty. The 2008 European Values Study (EVS) found that 70.3% of respondents in Malta said that the death penalty can never be justified, while only 4.5% said it can always be justified.
