= Priisle =

Subdistrict of Tallinn, Estonia

Coordinates: 59.451227°N 24.881072°E

- Subdistrict of Tallinn
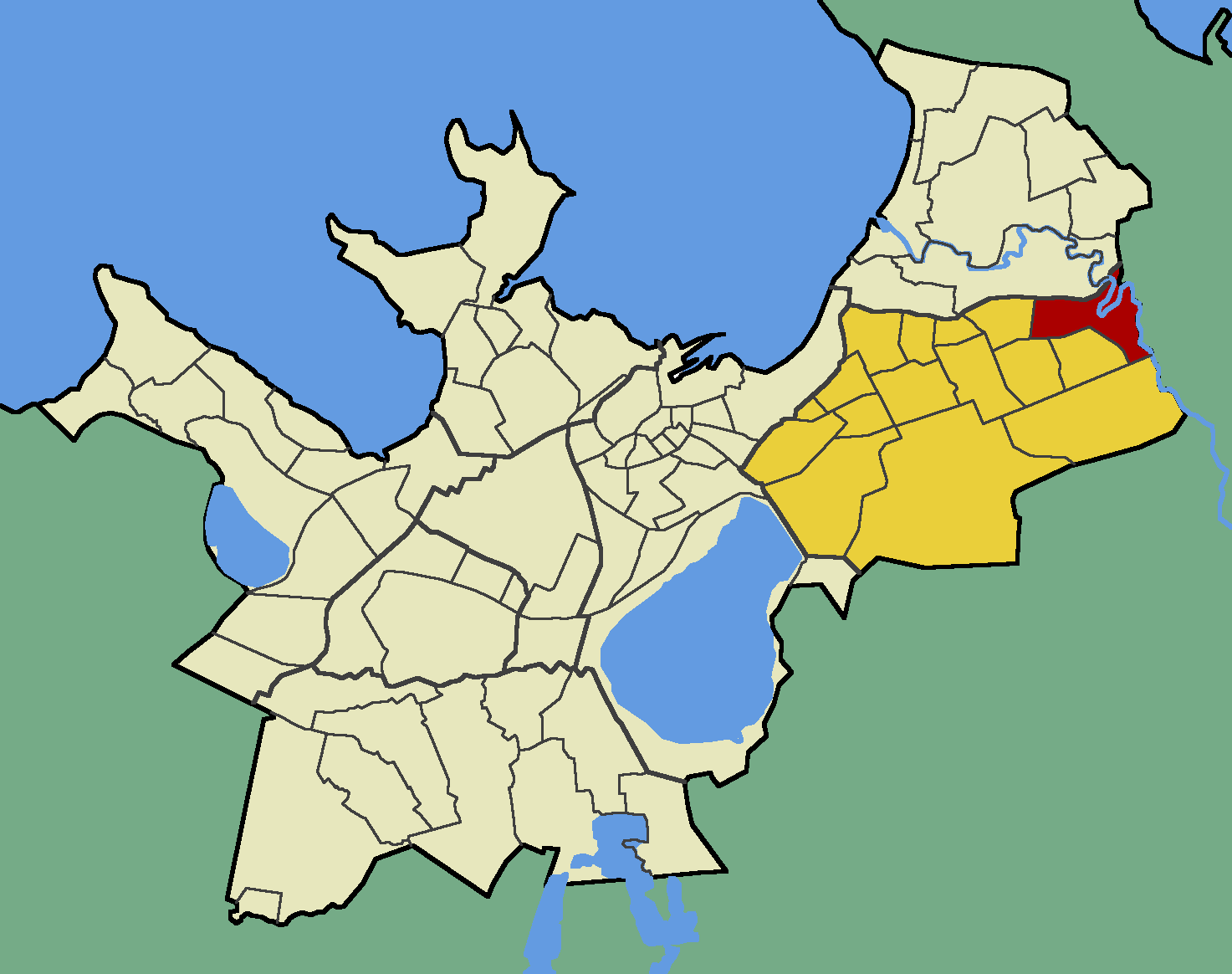
- Priisle within Lasnamäe District.
- Country: Estonia
- County: Harju County
- City: Tallinn
- District: Lasnamäe

Population (01.01.2014)
  - Total: 10,949

Priisle is a subdistrict (Estonian: asum) in the district of Lasnamäe, Tallinn, the capital of Estonia. It has a population of 10,949 (As of 1 January 2014).

== Iru hill fort ==
On a hill by Pirita River in Iru, the remains of an ancient hill fort are located. The settlement has a history dating back to the third millennium BC. It seems to have been continuously occupied, and strengthened into a more fortress-like castle in the 5th century AD. It remained in use until the 11th century. Archaeological investigations have shown that the settlement was burnt several times. Some of the oldest remains of buildings in Estonia, as well as some of the oldest items made of iron, have been found during excavations.

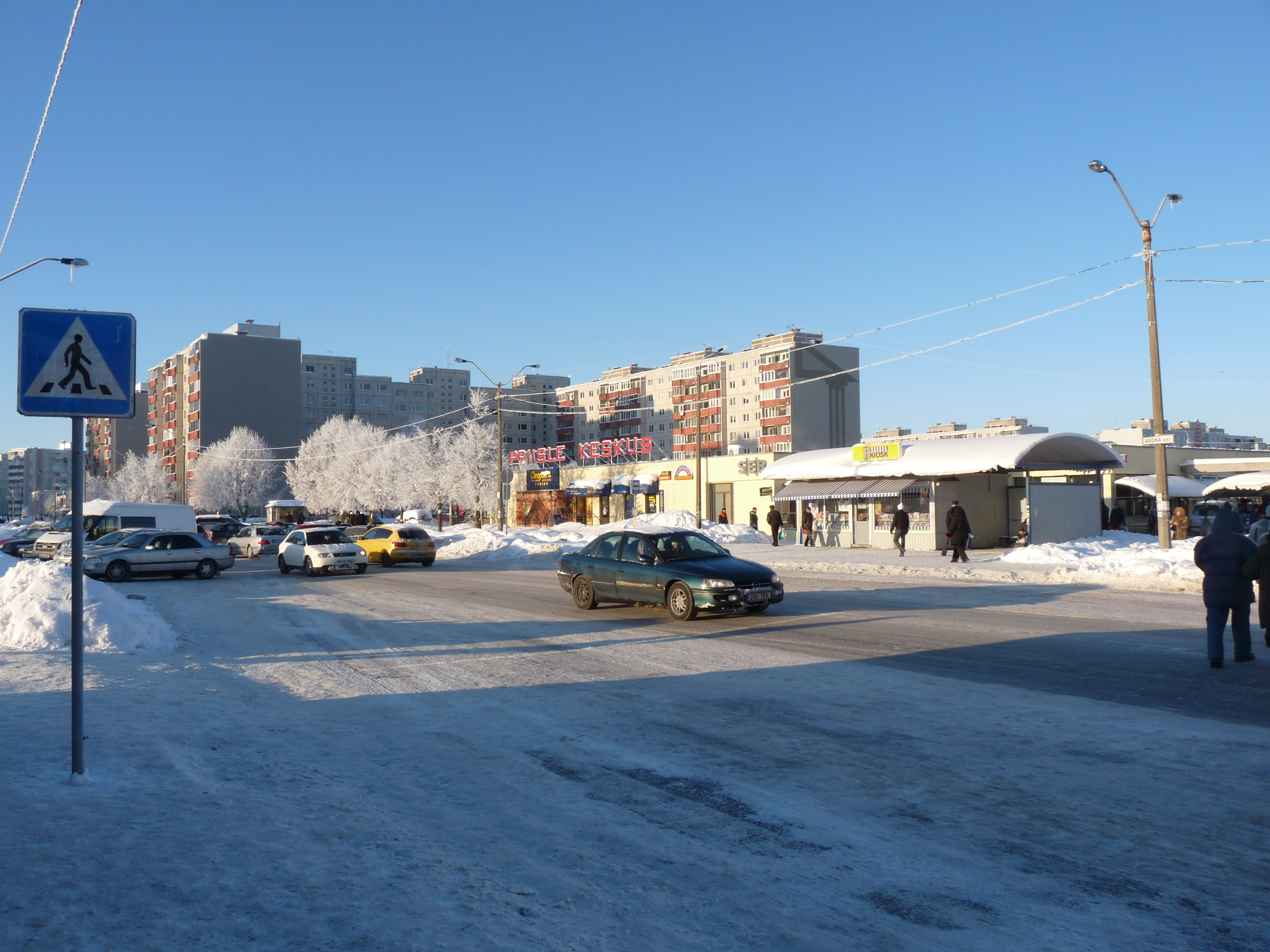
Priisle center

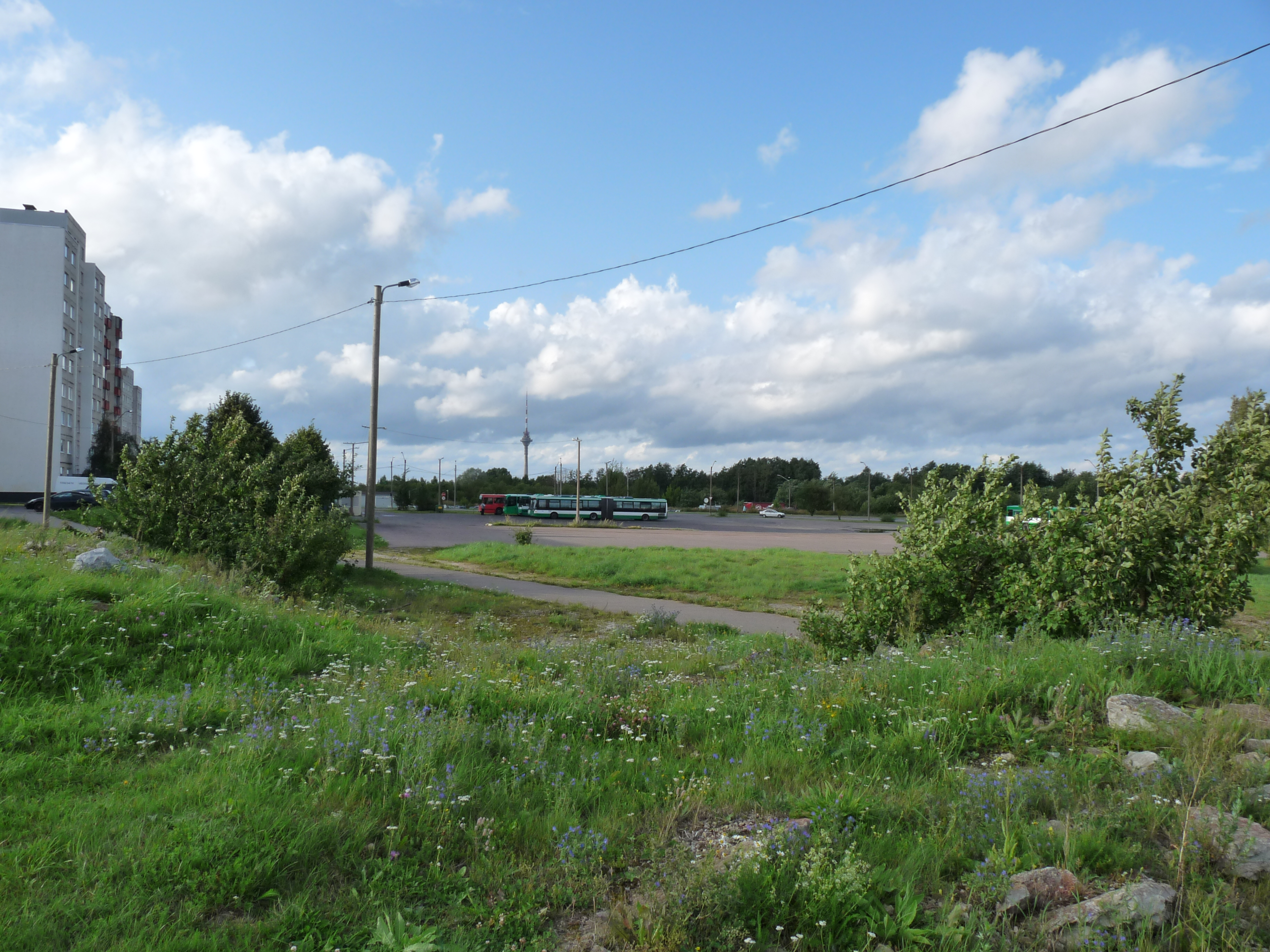
End of Kärberi street

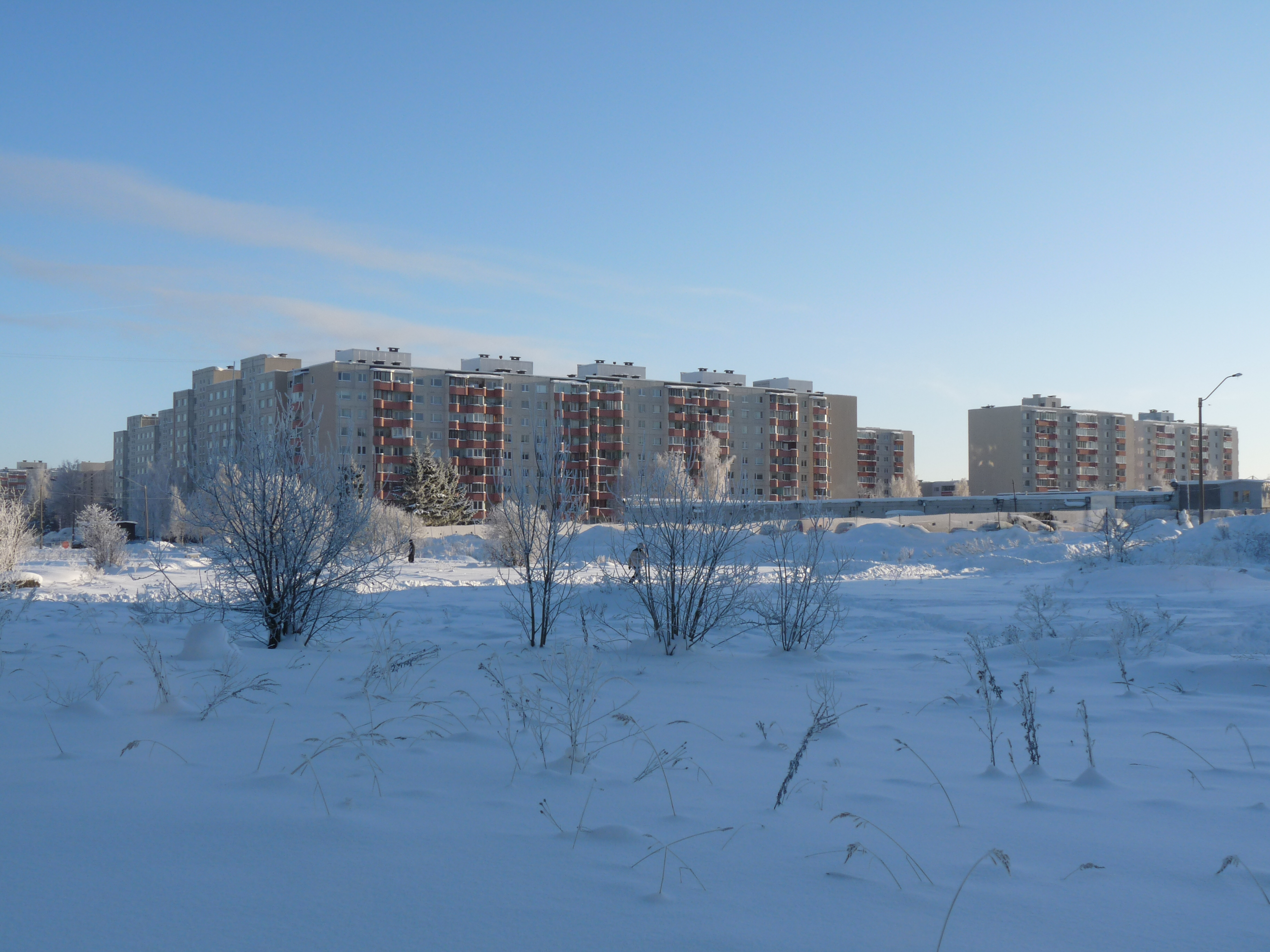
Linnamäe

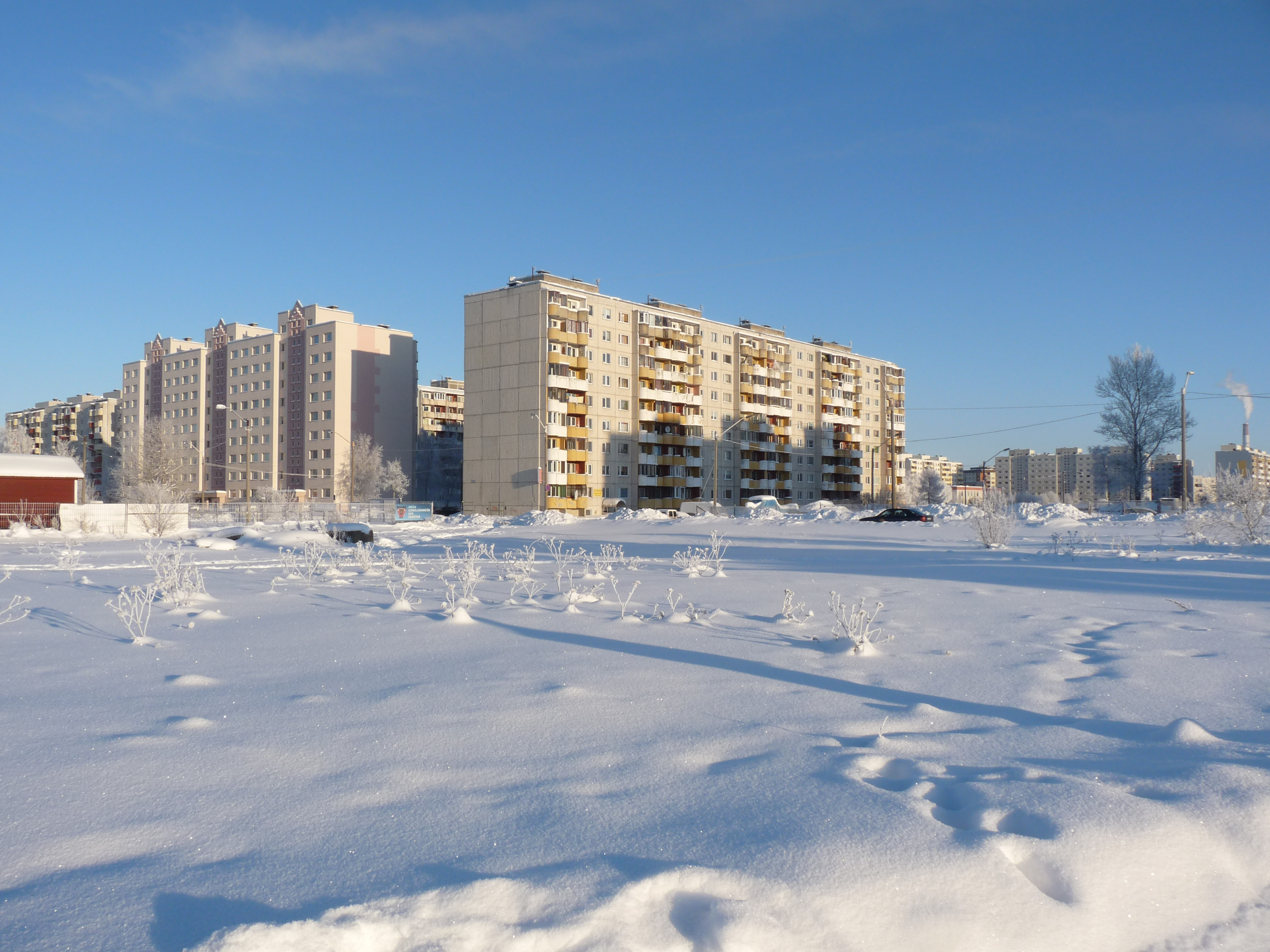

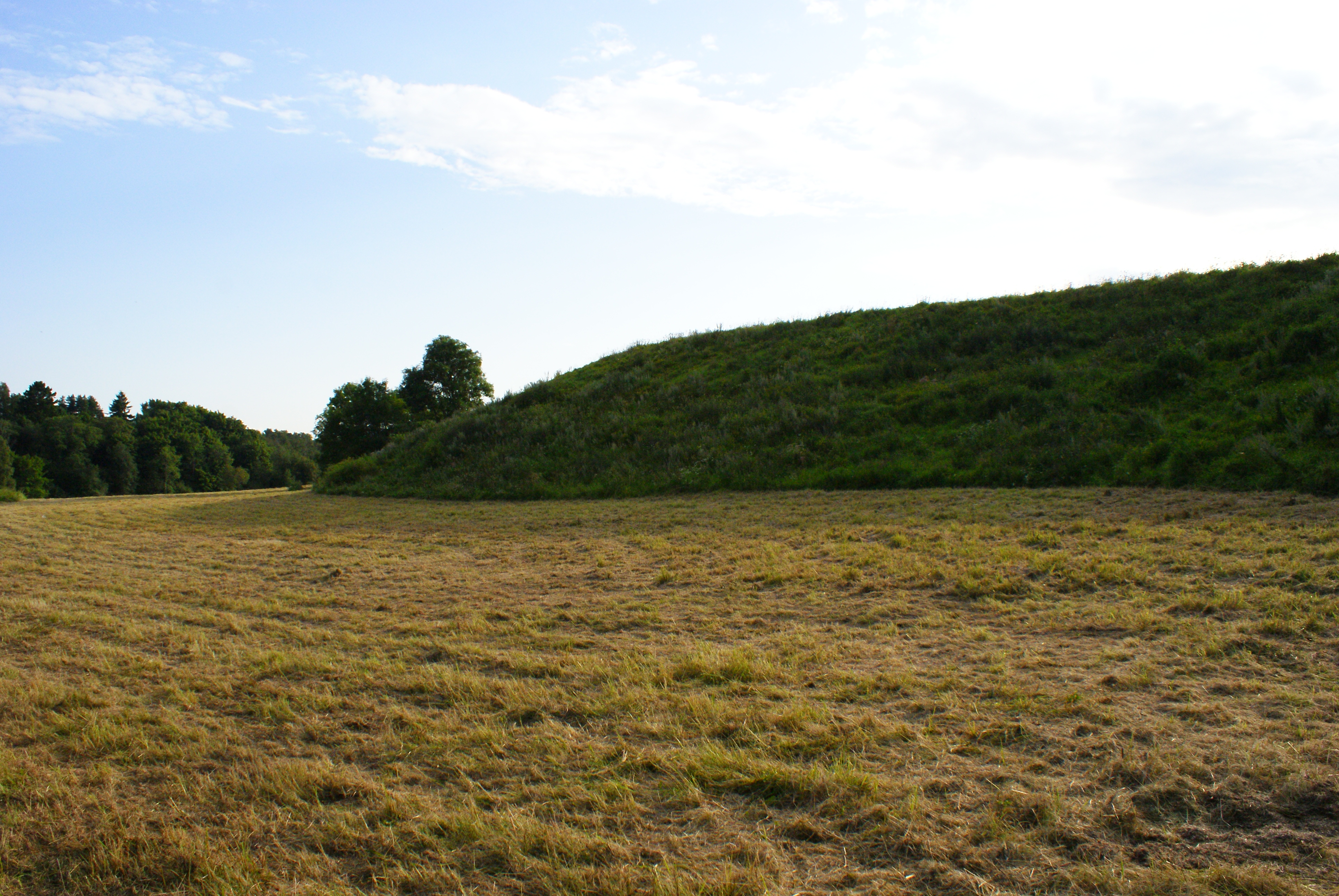
Iru hill fort, site of an Ancient Estonian settlement, surrounded by the Pirita River.
