= Pyrophilia =

Sexual gratification from fire and fire-starting activity

Pyrophilia is a relatively uncommon paraphilia in which a subject derives gratification from fire and fire-starting activity. It is distinguished from pyromania by the gratification being of a sexual nature.

== Description ==
While the erotic focus immediately raises the diagnostic issue of pyromania, the Diagnostic and Statistical Manual of Mental Disorders IV classifies this disorder as an impulse-control disorder, with nothing to indicate or suggest an overlap between this disorder and the paraphilias.

Other than the purposeful act of fire-setting itself, there is no mention of the possibility that the tension or affective arousal experienced before the act; the fascination with, interest in, or attraction to fire and its situational contexts (for example, paraphernalia, uses, consequences); or the pleasure, gratification, or relief when setting, witnessing, or participating in the aftermath of fires might be sexual in nature or even contain a sexual arousal component.

Some described cases of pyrophilia do not include behaviors commonly associated with pyromania, such as being a regular “watcher” at fires in their neighbourhood; setting off false alarms; deriving pleasure from institutions, equipment, and personnel associated with fire, spending time at the local fire station, setting fires in order to be affiliated with the fire department; and either showing indifference to the consequences to life and property caused by the fire or deriving satisfaction from the resulting destruction of property. Sexual gratification need not involve actual fire; arousal or masturbatory aids may include fantasies or talk of setting a fire. In other instances, the patient may derive arousal primarily from setting or watching their fire.

Pyrophilia has been diagnosed in very few instances, and is not fully accepted by the general psychological community.

== See also ==
- Arson
- Pyromania
