= Capital punishment in Cyprus =

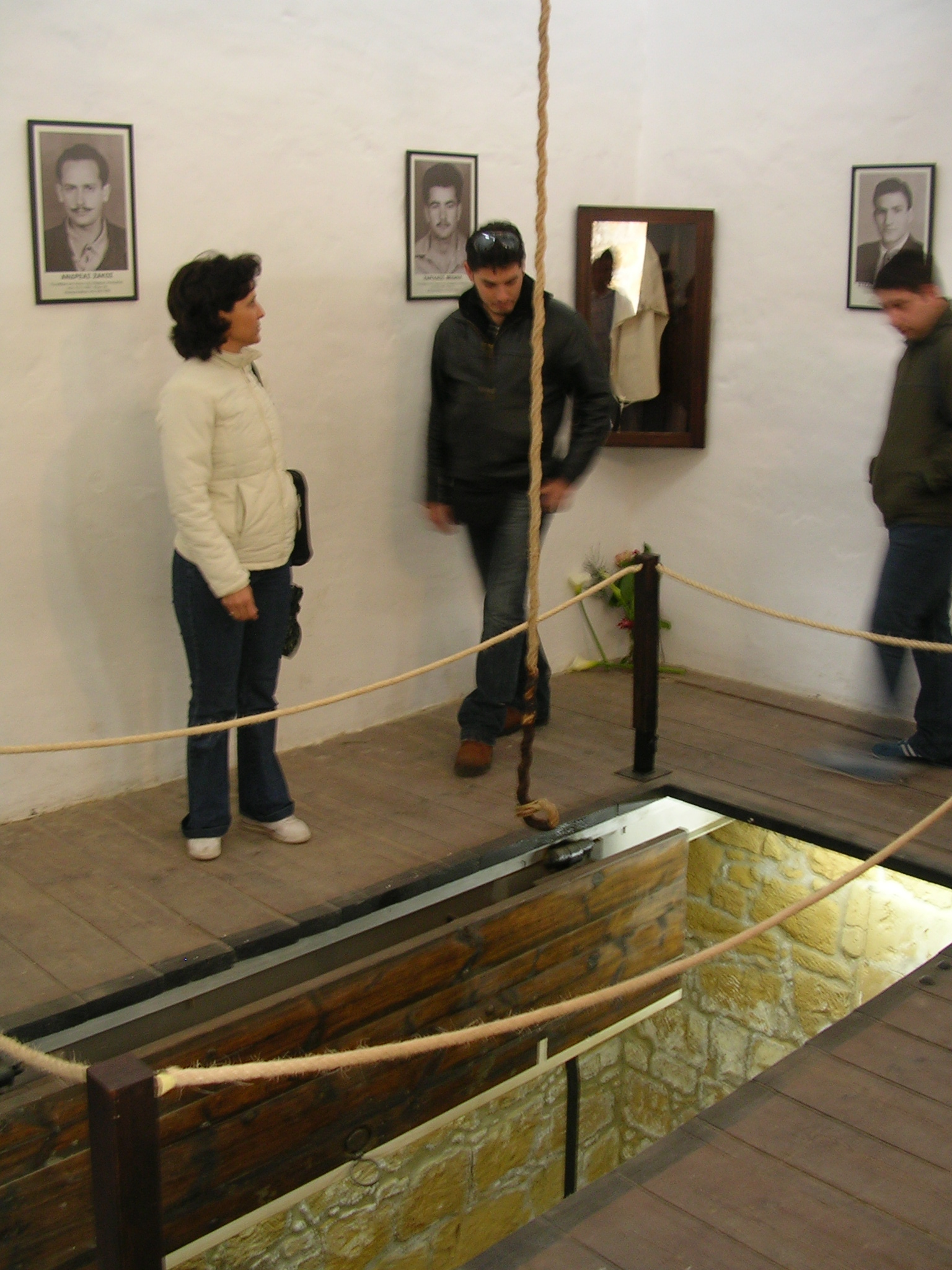
The gallows at the Nicosia Central Prison, now a museum (2006)

Capital punishment for murder was abolished in Cyprus on 15 December 1983. It was abolished for all crimes on 19 April 2002. The death penalty was replaced with life imprisonment. Cyprus is a signatory to the second optional protocol of the International Covenant on Civil and Political Rights, which provides for full abolition of capital punishment. Cyprus initially had a reservation on the second protocol, allowing execution for grave crimes in times of war, but subsequently withdrew this reservation. The Constitution of Cyprus was amended in 2016 to eliminate all forms of capital punishment.

The last three executions in Cyprus were carried out on the same day, 13 June 1962. These executions were the first after Cyprus gained independence in 1960 and therefore remain the only ones the country has ever carried out. Three men, Hambis Zacharia, Michael Hiletikos and Lazaris Demetriou, were hanged for murder at the Central Jail of Nicosia, the country's only prison.

Zacharia had killed a man in a Limassol vineyard with an axe in September 1958. Hiletikos and Demetriou were convicted of shooting a man outside a Limassol night-club in 1961. Hiletikos had fled to Britain, but was extradited back to Cyprus in November 1961. The British executioners Harry Allen and John Underhill travelled to Cyprus to carry out the hangings.

Prior to independence, nine men had been hanged in 1956 and 1957 by the British for acts committed as members of EOKA. The Central Jail of Nicosia still functions as a prison, but the area where executions were carried out is now a museum.

The unrecognised state of the Turkish Republic of Northern Cyprus retains the death penalty. Article 15 of the state's constitution declares that capital punishment can be imposed in cases of treason during wartime, acts of terrorism, piracy jure gentium, and for repeated crimes punishable by life imprisonment. Even in these instances, no execution of capital punishment can be carried out unless the Northern Cyprus legislative assembly decides so under the provisions of Article 78. In 2014 the criminal code (cap. 154) was amended and capital punishment was removed for all instances. However, the military criminal code still prescribes execution by firing squad for the severe acts of treason, specifically when personnel endanger state security, surrender unlawfully, or disobey critical operational orders during wartime or mobilization. As of 2026 Northern Cyprus has never carried out an execution.
