= Life imprisonment in Albania =

In Albania, life imprisonment is a legal penalty for men over 18 who commit certain crimes. It is the severest punishment available under Albanian law. Parole may only be granted after the prisoner has served 25 years (or 35 years in extreme cases), and only if the prisoner is found unlikely to re-offend and has displayed perfect behavior while in prison. Otherwise, an inmate shall not be released, and will remain in prison for the rest of their lives. Albania is one of the few countries in Europe that imposes life sentences without possibility of parole. Only men may receive life; the maximum sentence for women is 30 years' imprisonment. Prisoners who committed their crimes when below the age of 18 may be sentenced to a maximum of 20 years.

Crimes that carry possible life sentences include murder, terrorism, crimes against humanity, war crimes, and serious violent crimes (e.g., robbery) resulting in death.
