= Capital punishment in Latvia =

Europe holds the greatest concentration of abolitionist states (blue). Map current as of 2022 Abolished for all offences Abolished in practice Retains capital punishment

Capital punishment in Latvia was abolished for ordinary crimes in 1999 and for crimes committed during wartime in 2012. Latvia is party to several international instruments which ban capital punishment.

== History ==
Latvia regained independence in 1991 after the fall of the Soviet Union. Subsequently, the death penalty in civilian cases was reserved for murder and the only method of execution, as during Soviet times, was shooting with a single bullet to the back of the head. The last executions took place in January 1996.

In October 1996, President Guntis Ulmanis stated that he would commute any death sentence to a term of imprisonment.

Latvia continued to hand down death sentences until 1998. On April 15, 1999 the death penalty in peacetime was abolished by ratifying Protocol No. 6 to the European Convention on Human Rights. In 2002, Latvia signed Protocol No. 13 to ECHR, concerning the abolition of the death penalty under all circumstances. The law on the ratification of Protocol 13 was adopted on 13 October 2011, and the protocol was ratified on 26 January 2012, entering into force on 1 May 2012.

Latvia was the last European Union country to retain capital punishment for wartime murder, until it abolished it in 2012. Latvia acceded to the Second Optional Protocol to the International Covenant on Civil and Political Rights in 2013.
