= Capital punishment in Armenia =

Capital punishment in Armenia was a method of punishment that was implemented within Armenia's Criminal Code and Constitution until its eventual relinquishment in the 2003 modifications made to the Constitution. Capital punishment's origin in Armenia is unknown, yet it remained present in the Armenia Criminal Code of 1961, which was enforced and applied until 1999. Capital punishment was incorporated into Armenian legislation and effectuated for capital crimes, which were crimes that were classified to be punishable by death, including treason, espionage, first-degree murder, acts of terrorism and grave military crimes.

The last publicly known use of capital punishment in Armenia was in 1991, when the execution was carried out with a single bullet shot to the head. After this, the death penalty was put on a moratorium and came under heavy criticism from both nations and international organisations.

== History ==
Armenia's application of capital punishment in the modern era dated back to their Criminal Code of 1961, of which was implemented while the country was under a republic of the Union of Soviet Socialist Republics. Armenia's Criminal Code of 1961 enforced the death penalty for 16 war-time crimes and 18 peace-time criminal offences. After their declaration of independence from the Union of Soviet Socialist Republics, Armenia suspended the use of capital punishment, yet they continued to use the Criminal Code of 1961, which enabled courts to legally sentence individuals who they believe had violated capital crimes to death.

In February 1991, an unknown individual was charged with committing first-degree murder and was executed through a single gun shot to the head. This would be the last time Armenia used the 1961 Criminal Code to sentence an individual to death and have that sentence carried out, and it would mark the last time the death penalty was used as a form of punishment. However, Armenia's courts would continue sentencing criminals to death, pending execution. Since 1990, there had been 13 death sentences that were imposed by courts before capital punishment was abolished.

=== Reform ===
1992 saw reform for Armenia's Criminal Code of 1961. The democratic government decided to remove two of the peace-time criminal offences, speculation and mass theft, bringing the total amount of criminal offences punishable by death down to 32.

In 1995, the revised Armenian Constitution was implemented, however, capital punishment was still implemented within the constitution. Under Chapter 2, Article 17 of the new Constitution, it states "Everyone has the right to life. Until such time as it is abolished, the death penalty may be prescribed by law for particular capital crimes, as an exceptional punishment". Moreover, Armenia's current Criminal Code experienced the removal of another capital crime; desertion. The continued implementation of the death penalty within their constitution, even after revision, brought criticism from Amnesty International, a Human Rights-focused organisation.

Armenia's acceptance to the Council of Europe in early 2001 illustrated a push towards the complete eradication of the death penalty with an official suspension of the death penalty being enforced shortly after joining the union. The Council of Europe has made the termination of the death penalty a necessity for membership hence, upon gaining membership status, Armenia had to sign Protocol No. 6. The European Convention on Human Rights which was enforced and used by the Council of Europe stated that, under Section I, Article 2, "Everyone's right to life shall be protected by law" and that, under Protocol No. 6, Article 1 "The death penalty shall be abolished". Nevertheless, Armenia's loyalty was tested when five criminals shot up parliament, killing the current prime minister and other governmental officials.

=== Removal ===
2003 came with an overhaul to the outdated Criminal Code and introduced Armenia's new Criminal Code of 2003 on 1 August. This change effectively saw the termination of the death penalty as a means of punishment for individuals charged after its incorporation (criminals convicted prior to this were legally able to be sentenced to death). Under Article 16(4), The Constitution also prohibited extradition if the individual being extradited will be sentenced to death. On top of this, on 29 September, Armenia also ratified (and later put into force on 1 October) Protocol No. 6 of the European Convention of Human Rights which banned the death penalty from being used in peace-times, restricting to only grave war-time criminal offences.

Armenia replaced crimes that had capital punishment as the sentence with life imprisonment. This resulted in the current 38 active cases of individuals being sentenced to death row to have their punishment changed to life imprisonment. The new Armenia Criminal Code of 2003 illustrated the circumstances surrounding individuals who had been sentenced to life imprisonment. Under Article 60, (1) of the Criminal Code, it states that life sentence is "isolation of the convict in a form of keeping him imprisoned in a corrective institution without time-limit". As of 2003, individuals can only be sentenced to life imprisonment pending that they break one of the following six criminal offences: murder, genocide, application of prohibited methods of war, terrorism against the representative of a foreign country or international organisation, international terrorism and crimes against human security.

2005 was the death penalty's final year in Armenian Constitution. The updated Constitution illustrated the complete removal of capital punishment, stating, under Chapter 2 (Fundamental Human and Citizen's Rights and Freedoms), Article 15, "Everyone shall have the right to life. No one shall be condemned to the death penalty or executed".

On 19 May 2006, Armenia signed Protocol No. 13 of the European Convention of Human Rights. Under Protocol No. 13, no derogation would be made for the application of the death penalty, even during times of emergency and war. However, as of May 2020, Armenia has yet to ratify or put the Protocol into force. Under Article 6 of the Armenian Constitution, international treaties do not enter legal force until they are ratified, illustrating they have yet to implement it.

== Capital crimes ==
In Armenia, from 1961 to 2003, capital crimes were considered serious criminal offences that had the possibility of being punishable by the death penalty. Armenia's Criminal Code of 1961 divided these crimes into two sections: peacetime and wartime (including military) crimes.

=== Peacetime crimes ===
Before revision of Armenia's Criminal Code in 1992, there were 18 peacetime crimes that had the ability to be punishable by death. They were: treason, espionage, acts of terrorism, acts of terrorism against representatives of foreign states, the creation and distribution of counterfeit cash, mass theft of state or social property, sabotage, organisational acts towards the commitment of grave crimes against the state, grave crimes against another workers' state, aggravated rape, speculation, activities causing disruption to the work of corrective labour institutions, bribe-taking, aircraft hijacking, banditry, the infringement of the life of a police officer or people's guard, premeditated murder under aggravated circumstances, and evasion of mobilisation.

In 1991, speculation and mass theft were rejected as capital crimes. As of the implementation of the Armenian Criminal Code of 2003, these peacetime crimes no longer have the possibility of carrying a death penalty if committed.

=== Wartime crimes ===
Before the amendment of Armenia's Criminal Code in 1992, there were 16 wartime crimes that, if committed, could include the death penalty as a form of punishment. These war-times crimes primarily could only be committed by an individual in the military. They were: desertion, insubordination, forcible actions against a superior officer, intentionally destroying or damaging military property, offering resistance to a superior or forcing him to violate official duties, abuse of authority, exceeding authority, and neglectful attitude towards duty, pillage, voluntary surrender into captivity, abandonment of ship, unwarranted abandonment of battlefield or refusal to use a weapon, violation of rules for performing combat lookout, violation of service regulations for guard duty, surrendering or abandoning to the enemy as a means of waging war, evasion of military service by mutilation or any other method and the unwarranted abandonment of unit in a combat situation.

In 1995, desertion was abolished as a capital crime. As of the implementation of the Armenian Criminal Code of 2003, these crimes in wartime no longer carry capital punishment.

== Public opinion and debate ==
The debate for removal began to take serious form with the election of the first president, Levon Ter-Petrosyan, who was recognisably anti-capital-punishment through his refusal to sign any death warrants, and the amended Armenia Constitution of 1995, which illustrated the move away from its application in the criminal justice system through Article 16.

=== Amnesty International ===
Amnesty International, a humans right focused organisation, wrote an academic article criticising Armenia's continued incorporation of the death penalty in their Constitution and criminal justice system, in 1997. The article, titled, "Armenia: Time to abolish the death penalty", argued that capital punishment was based on a poorly designed system that resulted in anonymity regarding the circumstances surrounding certain criminals. Moreover, the article expressed Amnesty's concerns over the obtainment of confessions through physical and mental duress, the lack of appeal and the continued use of sentencing individuals to death regardless of the moratorium in place.

Amnesty International also commented on the mysterious circumstances surrounding Armenia's last execution. The execution was held in Saratov, in the Russian Federation, with only the Armenian Minister of the Interior (at the time) knowing that the prisoner would be transferred, but not about the fate or execution. This raised flags concerning Armenia's control over their enforcement of capital punishment.

Moreover, Amnesty revealed the nature of Armenia's execution procedures. Upon the prisoner's plea for clemency being denied, they would be taken from their cell and their denied appeal for clemency would be read, right after which they would have immediately been taken to another cell and be executed by a sole executioner with a revolver.

=== The Council of Europe and their impact ===
The movement towards attaining membership in the Council of Europe saw standards being set for Armenia by the Council. In 1999, five gunmen shot up parliament, murdering the current prime minister, parliament speaker and six government officials. Some Armenians and high-ranking government officials demanded the gunmen be executed under the retained death penalty. However, due to the moratorium set in place post-1991, the execution of the gunmen was turned away, and instead they were sentenced to life imprisonment.

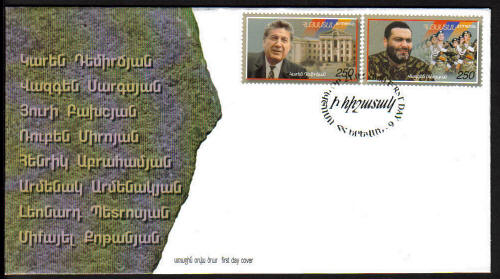
A postal card depicting Karen Demirchyan and Vazgen Sargsyan, the defence minister and a politician of Armenia at the time. Both were victims in the Armenia Parliament Shooting.

Following the aftermath, Vardan Ayvazyan, the leader of the Stability parliamentary group at the time stated that "Armenia, as a country, should develop a system of principles based on European values. From this point of view, the abolishment of capital punishments is necessary". Others disagreed with this opinion, Semyon Bagdasaryan, head of Stability Group, stated "In my opinion the verdict on the people involved in the 27 October case should be capital punishment", this argument was supported by the new Prime Minister, Andranik Margaryan, who called for the execution of the five gunmen. A representative of the Council of Europe stated that sentencing the gunmen to death "could bring the Parliamentary Assembly to suspend the participation of Armenia", the representative continued, stating "Abolition of capital punishment is a hard-core human rights principle and therefore non-negotiable for the Council of Europe". Ultimately, the Armenian courts decided to sentence the five gunmen to life imprisonment, abiding by the wishes of the Council of Europe and retaining their membership status.

== Other information ==
Ashot Manukyan was an Armenian citizen who experienced the many changes capital punishment went through in Armenia during his imprisonment. In 1996, Ashot Manukyan was sentenced to capital punishment for first-degree murder changes of three Armenian servicemen. However, following capital punishment's removal in 2003, all death sentences were abolished, this saw his initial punishment of being sentenced to death be substituted for life imprisonment. On 24 January 2020, Ashot Manukyan was released from prison and placed on parole after serving 24 years from his life sentence, following a decision made by the Criminal Court of Appeal of Armenia, which was based on a negative conclusion given from the Penitentiary Service of the Ministry of Justice and positive conclusion from the Probation Service.

== See also ==
- Capital punishment in Europe
- Human rights in Armenia
- Social issues in Armenia
