= Capital punishment in Ukraine =

Europe holds the greatest concentration of abolitionist states (blue). Map current as of 2022 Abolished for all offences Abolished in practice Retains capital punishment

Capital punishment was abolished in Ukraine in 2000. In 1995 Ukraine entered the Council of Europe and thus was obliged to abolish the death penalty. The Verkhovna Rada introduced amendments to the then-acting Criminal Code in 2000, according to which "death penalty" was withdrawn from the list of official punishments of Ukraine. Ukraine carried out its last execution in 1997 according to Amnesty International.

== History ==
Capital punishment continued to be a legal penalty in Ukraine following the collapse of the Russian Empire in 1917. Among the list of known people who were executed by the Ukrainian authorities was Ivan Samosenko.

In October 1995, Ukraine formally committed to abolishing the death penalty. A month later, Ukraine became a member of the Council of Europe, with the abolition of capital punishment being one of the key obligations it undertook with this accession.

Despite this commitment, Ukraine continued to issue death sentences and conduct executions. This led to a warning from the PACE in January 1997, threatening to prevent Ukraine's full participation in the Assembly. In response, Ukraine introduced a moratorium on executions in March 1997 and signed Protocol No. 6 of ECHR. However, continued concerns led to another threat from PACE in 1999 to annul the credentials of the Ukrainian delegation. This pressure ultimately prompted the Parliament to ratify the Protocol with 228 out of 450 deputies voting in favor, just exceeding the required 226.

At the request of the People's Deputies of Ukraine, the Constitutional Court ruled the death penalty unconstitutional in December 1999. The Verkhovna Rada introduced amendments to the then-acting Criminal Code in April 2000 that withdrew capital punishment from the list of official punishments in Ukraine (in peace and wartime).

Ukraine was the last Council of Europe member state that used to be part of the Eastern Bloc to abolish the death penalty for peacetime offenses. Latvia, also a former Soviet republic, abolished it for wartime offenses only in 2012.

== Politics ==
National Corps, a Ukrainian far-right political party, supports bringing back the death penalty.

== Reintroduction in Donetsk and Luhansk People's Republics ==
The Donetsk People's Republic, a Russian occupied, partially recognized breakaway state in territory internationally recognised as part of Ukraine, introduced the death penalty in 2014 for cases of treason, espionage, and assassination of political leaders. There had already been accusations of extrajudicial executions occurring. The Luhansk People's Republic, which was also a partially recognised secessionist breakaway state in what is Ukrainian territory, also introduced capital punishment.

On June 9, 2022, following the siege of Mariupol during the Russian Invasion of Ukraine, British volunteers to Ukraine Aiden Aslin and Shaun Pinner, and Moroccan Brahim Saadoun were sentenced to death for "terroristic activities" in a proceeding widely described as a show trial; however, they were later released in a POW exchange between Ukraine and Russian authorities.

The Ukrainian government, which did not recognize the independence of these republics, threatened to prosecute anyone involved in such executions for murder.

== Statistics ==
Amnesty International data from 1996 indicates that Ukraine had the second-highest number of executions globally, surpassed only by China.

Death penalty in Ukraine
Year	Sentenced	Executed
1992	79	103
1993	117	78
1994	143	60
1996	167	167
1997		13

While executions ceased in 1997, courts continued to hand down death sentences. This led to an increase in the number of people on death row, rising from 250 in 1997 to 400 in 1999.

Between 1992 and 1995, a total of 339 death sentences were handed down. Of these, 337 were for premeditated murder and 2 were for rape. On average, four death sentences were commuted per year during this period.

== Public opinion ==
In 1991, 58% of Ukrainians believed that capital punishment was necessary. Support for the death penalty peaked in 2000, the year it was officially abolished, with 72% of the population supporting it. Following its abolition, public support for its restoration has fluctuated. In 2016, only 37% of Ukrainians believed capital punishment was necessary. By 2017, 38% expressed a desire for its restoration, a figure that rose to 51% in 2021.

The NASU Institute of Sociology has published data on public opinion regarding the abolition of the death penalty:

Should the death penalty have been abolished in Ukraine?
	2002	2004	2006	2008	2010	2012	2014	2016
Yes	14.4	14.6	20.3	23.5	21.7	20.9	26.1	30.8
Hard to tell	18.7	22.2	24.9	25.1	28.1	22.9	27.8	26.1
No	66.8	61.7	54.5	51.1	49.8	55.7	45.7	43.0
