= Capital punishment in Georgia (country) =

Capital punishment in Georgia was completely abolished on 1 May 2000 when the country signed Protocol 6 to the ECHR. Later Georgia also adopted the Second Optional Protocol to the ICCPR. Capital punishment was replaced with life imprisonment.

The last person executed in Georgia was in 1995, having been convicted for murder. The person was executed by a single shot to the back of the head.

== History ==
In ancient times and the Middle Ages, the death penalty was imposed in Georgia for crimes considered especially heinous, such as treason, piracy, and publicly insulting the king. In 1170, King George III of Georgia also decreed capital punishment for "repeated theft". Various methods of execution were used, including hanging, strangulation, throwing from a cliff, and burning alive.

Tamar of Georgia was the first monarch to abolish the death penalty in Georgia. This was attributed to the decline in theft and piracy during her reign, resulting from increased prosperity as the Kingdom of Georgia became one of the strongest states in the region. The abolition is believed to have remained in effect until the second half of the 13th century, when the Mongols invaded Georgia.

In 19th-century Russian Georgia, Ilia Chavchavadze was one of the most prominent advocates of abolishing the death penalty. He campaigned for its abolition in the Russian Duma. Following his assassination, his wife, honoring his abolitionist views, appealed to the Tsarist authorities not to execute his murderers.

Article 19 of the Constitution of the Georgian Democratic Republic abolished the death penalty in Georgia. However, the constitution was adopted on 21 February 1921, only a few days before the Sovietization of Georgia.

=== Soviet Georgia ===
Socialist doctrine rejected the use of the death penalty, and Soviet criminal and penal theory formally gave preference to correction and re-education. In practice, however, the death penalty was used throughout most of the Soviet Union's history. It was officially described as an "exceptional measure of punishment" that would remain in force only until its "full abolition".

On 25 March 1921, the government decreed the death penalty for hoarding in an attempt to address shortages of goods, which were attributed to speculation by merchants. The first case in the registration archive department of the Georgian Cheka concerned seven individuals accused by the Cheka of appropriating foodstuffs. Three of them were sentenced to death and executed extrajudicially.

Between 1921 and 1924, many summary executions were carried out by the Cheka against "counter-revolutionaries", including Georgian military officers involved in the Committee for the Independence of Georgia. During the Great Purge in 1937–1938, the Special NKVD Troika of the Georgian SSR (Особая Тройка при НКВД ГССР) tried more than 20,000 people under NKVD Order No. 00447 for being classified as “kulaks, criminals and other counter-revolutionary elements”. In October 1937, citing overcrowded prisons, Lavrentiy Beria requested that the functions of the Military Collegium of the Supreme Court of the Soviet Union be delegated to the local Special Troika, allowing it to consider cases against individuals accused of membership in "Trotskyist terrorist subversive-espionage organizations" and "right-wing terrorist-subversive espionage organizations". The request was approved. Throughout the Soviet Union, Georgia was the only exception where individuals included in the "Stalin's lists" were tried by the Special Troika, and the judicial functions related to the purges were fully integrated into the Special Troika. Overall, it is estimated that the Special Troika in Georgia sentenced more than 10,000 people to death for various reasons. Additionally, the NKVD "National Troika" tried 1,982 people, of whom 432 were executed.

The death penalty in peacetime was abolished on 26 May 1947 by a special edict of the highest legislative body, the Presidium of the Supreme Soviet of the USSR, but it was restored on 12 May 1950 by the same body. Thereafter, cases involving a possible death sentence were tried by a panel of three judges, one of whom was a professional judge, while the others were "people's assessors". The sentence was passed by a majority vote. Convicts could appeal the decision, except in cases where they were tried by the Georgian Supreme Court as a court of first instance. A sentence could also be reduced through judicial review following a protest by the relevant judicial authority. The Georgian Supreme Soviet or the USSR Supreme Soviet could grant clemency to a convicted person. The death penalty was not applied to pregnant women or minors.

The Georgian Criminal Code of 1960 provided for capital punishment as a possible penalty for 33 crimes. By 1991, the criminal code prescribed capital punishment as a possible penalty for up to 30 crimes, including some that did not involve the use of violence. Between 1980 and 1991, 124 people were sentenced to death, 65 of whom were executed.

=== Post-Soviet years ===
The first post-Soviet years were characterized by inconsistent approaches toward the practice of capital punishment in Georgia. Following the declaration of independence, Georgia continued to operate under the Soviet-era criminal code, which prescribed the death penalty as a possible punishment for multiple crimes. On 20 March 1991, Georgia became the first former Soviet republic to take concrete steps toward abolishing the death penalty, with the parliament removing it as a possible punishment for four economic offences. In August, it was also abolished for two additional offences.

In 1992, the Georgian Military Council announced its intention to declare a moratorium on death sentences until the adoption of a new criminal code. On 21 February 1992, Georgia restored the Constitution of the Georgian Democratic Republic, which contained a provision abolishing the death penalty. However, the old criminal code remained in force and continued to provide for capital punishment. On 17 June 1992, the Georgian State Council issued a resolution stating that the relevant bodies were tasked with drafting proposals to bring existing legislation into conformity with the constitution. Until such amendments were adopted through legislative procedures, however, all existing legislation, including provisions concerning punishment and the death penalty, remained in force.

Consequently, provisions prescribing the death penalty remained in effect. The abolition was not incorporated into Georgian legislation, and the criminal code continued to provide for capital punishment. Courts therefore continued to issue death sentences, although judicial executions were no longer carried out. Thus, Georgia had a moratorium on executions, but not on death sentences themselves.

On 3 August 1992, the death penalty was abolished for 14 military crimes, most of which carried this possible punishment only when committed during wartime or in combat situations.

With the beginning of the War in Abkhazia, local military tribunals unauthorized by the Georgian government were established in the region and carried out several executions.

In March and July 1993, two new offences punishable by death — genocide and mercenary activities — were introduced into the criminal code. This may have been related to the War in Abkhazia. On 2 November 1993, Eduard Shevardnadze issued a decree authorizing extrajudicial executions in cases of banditry and looting. The decree was issued in the context of the armed conflicts taking place in the country. On 7 November 1993, nine people were shot dead for looting in Zugdidi. According to the Tbilisi commandant, "several people" were summarily executed during a curfew in Tbilisi in November 1993 after refusing to present identification documents.

In March 1994, the moratorium on judicial executions was lifted, and at least 14 people were executed before February 1995, mostly for premeditated aggravated murder. At the same time, at least 20 death sentences were commuted.

In February 1995, under a tacit agreement, the Clemency Commission suspended consideration of clemency petitions in death sentence cases. Since clemency petitions had to be reviewed by the Commission before the cases could be submitted to the President, whose final decision was required for an execution to be carried out, this effectively blocked the execution procedure. As a result, a de facto moratorium on the death penalty was established.

The new Constitution of Georgia, adopted in August 1995, retained the death penalty as an "exceptional measure of punishment... for the commission of especially serious crimes against life". On 11 December 1996, the Parliament abolished capital punishment for 11 crimes. By February 1997, the criminal code prescribed the death penalty as a possible punishment for only seven crimes. Instead of capital punishment, a new category of punishment — life imprisonment — was introduced into legislation.

On 10 December 1996, Eduard Shevardnadze declared an official moratorium on executions, stating that the abolition of capital punishment was necessary for Georgia's accession to the Council of Europe. However, courts continued to issue death sentences during this period, although they remained unenforced. Since most death sentences had been issued for premeditated aggravated murder, abolishing capital punishment for other crimes did not produce a significant statistical difference. As of February 1997, 51 people were held on death row in prison, in conditions described by Human Rights Commissioner Aleksandr Kavsadze as "defying description".

Besides other violations of due process, law enforcement officials were frequently reported to have used torture and other forms of violence, particularly to extract confessions from defendants. Death sentences were issued in cases involving political prisoners, including supporters of the violently deposed President Zviad Gamsakhurdia, who were defeated by Eduard Shevardnadze's post-coup government during the civil war. Prominent death sentences included those issued against Badri Zarandia and Loti Kobalia, Gamsakhurdia loyalists, as well as Davit Otiashvili, a member of the formerly pro-Shevardnadze Mkhedrioni militia, which was disbanded by Shevardnadze in 1995.

In July 1997, President Shevardnadze commuted the death sentences of all prisoners awaiting execution, including Kobalia, Zarandia, and other Gamsakhurdia loyalists, reducing their sentences to 20 years' imprisonment. On 11 November 1997, the Parliament of Georgia abolished the death penalty for all crimes under the Georgian criminal code. Georgia became the second post-Soviet country — after Moldova — to abolish the death penalty. This abolition was further reinforced by the signing of Protocol No. 6 to the European Convention on Human Rights. Georgia later also adopted the Second Optional Protocol to the ICCPR. Despite this, a constitutional provision allowing the introduction of capital punishment in exceptional cases remained in force.

On 27 December 2006, the Parliament of Georgia adopted a constitutional amendment banning the death penalty in the constitution.

==== Debate ====
There was a public debate in the 1990s over whether the death penalty should be retained or abolished. Much of the concern was related to rising violent crime and the ineffectiveness of judicial and law-enforcement institutions. Criminal groups were often able to free their members from prison through the use of force. People frequently took justice into their own hands, and suspects were sometimes subjected to mob violence, including stoning. In addition, a majority of the population considered the death penalty necessary as a deterrent against future crimes. According to former MP Elene Tevdoradze, by the time of the abolition of the death penalty in 1997, approximately half of the population supported retaining it, while the other half opposed it.

Zurab Zhvania, then chairman of the Georgian parliament, was one of the leading supporters of abolition. However, opponents of abolition expressed criticism. The leader of the Georgian Labor Party, Shalva Natelashvili, argued that abolishing capital punishment could potentially lead to an increase in lynching. The leader of the Socialist Party, Vakhtang Rcheulishvili, questioned the motives behind the abolition, including Georgia's accession to the Council of Europe. He argued that Georgia lacked an alternative system to replace capital punishment and that it would have been preferable to prioritize national interests over the expectations of the Council of Europe. Zhvania, on the other hand, argued that the abolition of capital punishment was rooted in Georgia's "long-standing traditions", while Ilia Chavchavadze's opposition to the death penalty was also frequently cited by supporters of abolition.

On 10 December 1996, one day before announcing an official moratorium on capital punishment, President Eduard Shevardnadze addressed the MPs in a letter:

The protection of human rights in Georgia is based on the humane traditions of our people and is guaranteed by the new Georgian Constitution. The supreme human right is the right to life. This is given to humans by God but it should be protected by the state.

However, in August 2003, Shevardnadze expressed regret over the abolition of the death penalty. He stated that, had it not been for considerations related to the Council of Europe, Georgia would not have abolished capital punishment, adding that criminals had "lost fear" following its abolition. It has been suggested that this statement was intended as a signal of support for the Interior Ministry, which had long advocated stricter measures against crime.

== Capital crimes ==
Until 1991, the Criminal Code of the Georgian SSR provided for capital punishment for 30 crimes. These crimes were:

- Article 82: Evading mobilization (Death penalty abolished on 2 August 1991)
- Article 88: Making or passing counterfeit money or securities (Death penalty abolished on 20 March 1991)
- Article 89: Violating the rules of currency transactions (Death penalty abolished on 20 March 1991)
- Article 96-1: Theft of state or social property on an especially large scale (Death penalty abolished on 20 March 1991)
- Article 189: Taking a bribe (Death penalty abolished on 20 March 1991)
- Article 242-2: Hijacking of an aircraft (Death penalty abolished on 2 August 1991)
- Article 256: Insubordination (Death penalty abolished on 3 August 1992)
- Article 260: Using foce against a superior (Death penalty abolished on 3 August 1992)
- Article 265: Desertion (Death penalty abolished on 3 August 1992)
- Article 266: Unwarranted abandonment of a unit in a combat situation (Death penalty abolished on 3 August 1992)
- Article 269: Intentional destruction or damaging of military property (Death penalty abolished on 3 August 1992)
- Article 273: Violating the service regulations for guard duty (Death penalty abolished on 3 August 1992)
- Article 275: Violating the rules for performing combat lookout (Death penalty abolished on 3 August 1992)
- Article 278: Abuse of authority, exceeding authority, and neglectful attitude toward duty (Death penalty abolished on 3 August 1992)
- Article 279: Surrendering or abandoning to the enemy means of waging war (Death penalty abolished on 3 August 1992)
- Article 280: Abandonment of a sinking warship (Death penalty abolished on 3 August 1992)
- Article 281: Unwarranted abandonment of a battlefield or refusal to use a weapon (Death penalty abolished on 3 August 1992)
- Article 282: Voluntary surrender into captivity (Death penalty abolished on 3 August 1992)
- Article 284: Pillage (Death penalty abolished on 3 August 1992)
- Article 285: Using force against the population in an area of military operations (Death penalty abolished on 3 August 1992)
- Article 65: Treason (Death penalty abolished on 1 February 1997)
- Article 66: Espionage (Death penalty abolished on 1 February 1997)
- Article 67: Terrorist acts (Death penalty abolished on 11 November 1997)
- Article 68: Terrorist acts against a representative of a foreign state (Death penalty abolished on 11 November 1997)
- Article 69: Sabotage (Death penalty abolished on 11 November 1997)
- Article 78: Banditism (Death penalty abolished on 1 February 1997)
- Article 78-1: Actions disrupting the work of corrective labour institutions (Death penalty abolished on 1 February 1997)
- Article 104: Premeditated, aggravated murder (Death penalty abolished on 11 November 1997)
- Article 117: Rape (Death penalty abolished on 1 February 1997)
- Article 209-1: Attempt on the life of a police officer or people's guard (Death penalty abolished on 11 November 1997)
- Article 258: Resisting a superior or compelling him to violate official duties (Death penalty abolished on 11 November 1997)

Capital crimes introduced in 1993:

- Article 66-1: Participation by mercenaries in armed conflict or in combat action (Death penalty introduced on 17 March 1993, abolished on 1 February 1997)
- Article 65-1: Genocide (Death penalty introduced on 8 July 1993, abolished on 11 November 1997)

== Sources ==
- Republic of Georgia: Death Penalty— Update (PDF). Amnesty International. January 1994.
- Svanidze, Eric (2004). "Georgia: Managing Abolition". In Hodgkinson, Peter; Schabas, William (eds.). Capital Punishment: Strategies for Abolition. Cambridge University Press. ISBN 9781139449595.
- Georgia: Time to Abolish the Death Penalty (PDF). Amnesty International. January 1997.
