= Capital punishment in Estonia =

Europe holds the greatest concentration of abolitionist states (blue). Map current as of 2022 Abolished for all offences Abolished in practice Retains capital punishment

From 1935 to Estonia's incorporation into the Soviet Union in 1940, inmates condemned by civilian courts were given a choice to die either by poison-induced suicide or by hanging, as outlined in the Criminal Procedure Code (which took effect on 1 February 1935): "One hour before the scheduled time of the execution, the condemned shall be taken to a death cell, where the state prosecutor will read the death sentence and ask the prisoner whether he is willing to commit suicide. If the answer is in the affirmative, the prosecutor will hand the condemned a glass of poison—the kind of poison to be determined by the National Health Board. If the doomed man fails to take the poison within five minutes he will be hanged.'" Military executions were carried out by a firing squad.

During the Soviet era, the method of execution became a single shot by firearm to the back of the head. The last execution in Estonia took place on 11 September 1991 when Rein Oruste, convicted of murders, was shot in the back of the head at Patarei Prison. The death penalty was completely abolished in Estonia on 18 March 1998 when Protocol No. 6 to the ECHR was signed.

== Poll ==
In 2015, a poll found 70% of Estonians in favor of the death penalty. This was an increase of support from 62% in a 2010 poll.
