= Capital punishment in Azerbaijan =

Capital punishment in Azerbaijan was abolished on 10 February 1998. All executions were carried out at the death chamber ("ölüm kamerası") of Bayil prison. For the majority of modern history, executions were undertaken with a single gunshot to the heart. In the 1930s and 1950s, there were also executions by drowning. Protocol No. 6 to the ECHR came into force in this country on 25 January 2001 and the death penalty was replaced with life imprisonment.

The last executions took place in February 1993, when eight people were executed. At the time of abolition, 128 death row inmates had their sentences commuted.
