= List of United States Supreme Court opinions involving capital punishment =

The U.S. Supreme Court has issued numerous rulings on the use of capital punishment (the death penalty). While some rulings applied very narrowly, perhaps to only one individual, other cases have had great influence over wide areas of procedure, eligible crimes, acceptable evidence and method of execution.

== Eighth Amendment ==
=== Method of execution ===
- Wilkerson v. Utah, 99 U.S. 130 (1879) – Firing squad is constitutional.
- In re Kemmler, 136 U.S. 436 (1890) – Electrocution is constitutional.
- Stewart v. LaGrand, 526 U.S. 115 (1999)
- Nelson v. Campbell, 541 U.S. 637 (2004)
- Hill v. McDonough, 547 U.S. 573 (2006) – Challenging constitutionality of the execution method is a §1983 lawsuit, not a habeas corpus petition, and thus not subject to the procedural bar on successive petitions.
- Baze v. Rees, 553 U.S. 35 (2008) – Kentucky's lethal injection method using sodium thiopental is constitutional.
- Glossip v. Gross, 576 U.S. 863 (2015) – To be unconstitutional, a method of execution must involve any risk of harm which is substantial when compared to a known and available alternative method. The condemned has the burden of proof.
- Bucklew v. Precythe, No. 17-8151, 587 U.S. 119 (2019) – Baze v. Rees and Glossip v. Gross govern all Eighth Amendment challenges alleging that a method of execution inflicts unconstitutionally cruel pain. A method is unconstitutional only when it "superadds pain well beyond what's needed to effectuate a death sentence."
- Barr v. Lee, No. 20A8, 591 U.S. 398 (2020)
- Nance v. Ward, No. 21-439, 597 U.S. 159 (2022)

=== Specific crimes ===
- Coker v. Georgia, 433 U.S. 584 (1977) – The death penalty is unconstitutional for rape of an adult woman when the victim is not killed.
- Enmund v. Florida, 458 U.S. 782 (1982) – The death penalty is unconstitutional for a person who is a minor participant in a felony and does not kill, attempt to kill, or intend to kill.
- Tison v. Arizona, 481 U.S. 137 (1987) – Death penalty may be imposed on a felony-murder defendant who was a major participant in the underlying felony and exhibits extreme indifference to human life.
- Sumner v. Shuman, 483 U.S. 66 (1987) – Mandatory death penalty for a prison inmate who is convicted of murder while serving a life sentence without possibility of parole is unconstitutional.
- Kennedy v. Louisiana, 554 U.S. 407 (2008) – The death penalty is unconstitutional for child rape and other non-homicidal crimes against the person.

=== Related to age ===
- Thompson v. Oklahoma, 487 U.S. 815 (1988) – Death Penalty for crimes committed at 15 years of age or less is unconstitutional.
- Stanford v. Kentucky, 492 U.S. 361 (1989) – The death penalty for crimes committed at age 16 or 17 is constitutional. (Overruled in Roper v. Simmons)
- Roper v. Simmons, 543 U.S. 551 (2005) – The death penalty for those who committed their crimes while under 18 years of age is unconstitutional.

=== Intellectual disability ===
- Ford v. Wainwright, 477 U.S. 399 (1986) – Execution of an insane convict is unconstitutional.
- Penry v. Lynaugh, 492 U.S. 302 (1989) – Executing persons with intellectual disability is constitutional. (Overruled in Atkins v. Virginia)
- Stewart v. Martinez-Villareal, 523 U.S. 637 (1998) –
- Atkins v. Virginia, 536 U.S. 304 (2002) – The execution of intellectually disabled offenders is unconstitutional.
- Panetti v. Quarterman, 551 U.S. 930 (2007) – A person may not be executed if they do not understand the reason for their imminent execution. Once the state has set an execution date death-row inmates may litigate their competency to be executed in habeas corpus proceedings.
- Hall v. Florida, 572 U.S. 701 (2014) – IQ tests alone can not be used as a rigid limit for determining intellectual disability.
- Moore v. Texas, No. 15-797, 581 U.S. 1 (2017)
- Dunn v. Madison, No. 17-193, 583 U.S. 11 (2017)
- Madison v. Alabama, No. 17-7505, 586 U.S. 265 (2019) – Executing a prisoner who cannot remember committing his or her crime may be constitutional, but executing a prisoner who has dementia or another disorder, rather than psychotic delusions, may not be.

=== Trial procedure (conviction) ===
- Beck v. Alabama, 447 U.S. 625 (1980)
- Spaziano v. Florida, 468 U.S. 447 (1984)
- Arizona v. Fulminante, 499 U.S. 279 (1991)
- Schad v. Arizona, 501 U.S. 624 (1991)
- Howell v. Mississippi, 543 U.S. 440 (2005)

=== Trial procedure (sentencing) ===
- Furman v. Georgia, 408 U.S. 238 (1972)
- Gregg v. Georgia, 428 U.S. 153 (1976)
- Proffitt v. Florida, 428 U.S. 242 (1976)
- Jurek v. Texas, 428 U.S. 262 (1976)
- Woodson v. North Carolina, 428 U.S. 280 (1976)
- Roberts v. Louisiana, 428 U.S. 325 (1976)
- Gardner v. Florida, 430 U.S. 349 (1977)
- Lockett v. Ohio, 438 U.S. 586 (1978)
- Godfrey v. Georgia, 446 U.S. 420 (1980)
- Eddings v. Oklahoma, 455 U.S. 104 (1982)
- Zant v. Stephens, 462 U.S. 862 (1983)
- Barclay v. Florida, 463 U.S. 939 (1983)
- California v. Ramos, 463 U.S. 992 (1983)
- Spaziano v. Florida, 468 U.S. 447 (1984)
- Caldwell v. Mississippi, 472 U.S. 320 (1985)
- Skipper v. South Carolina, 476 U.S. 1 (1986)
- California v. Brown, 479 U.S. 538 (1987)
- McCleskey v. Kemp, 481 U.S. 279 (1987)
- Hitchcock v. Dugger, 481 U.S. 393 (1987)
- Booth v. Maryland, 482 U.S. 496 (1987)
- Sumner v. Shuman, 483 U.S. 66 (1987)
- Maynard v. Cartwright, 486 U.S. 356 (1988)
- Mills v. Maryland, 486 U.S. 367 (1988)
- South Carolina v. Gathers, 490 U.S. 805 (1989) – Admission of a victim impact statement at the sentencing phase of a death penalty-trial is unconstitutional. (Overruled in Payne v. Tennessee)
- Blystone v. Pennsylvania, 494 U.S. 299 (1990)
- Boyde v. California, 494 U.S. 370 (1990)
- McKoy v. North Carolina, 494 U.S. 433 (1990)
- Clemons v. Mississippi, 494 U.S. 738 (1990)
- Walton v. Arizona, 497 U.S. 639 (1990)
- Shell v. Mississippi, 498 U.S. 1 (1990)
- Lankford v. Idaho, 500 U.S. 110 (1991)
- Payne v. Tennessee, 501 U.S. 808 (1991) – Victim impact statements are admissible during the penalty phase of a capital case.
- Sochor v. Florida, 504 U.S. 527 (1992)
- Espinosa v. Florida, 505 U.S. 1079 (1992)
- Johnson v. Texas, 509 U.S. 350 (1993)
- Harris v. Alabama, 513 U.S. 504 (1995) – Allowing the judge to impose a death sentence and making the jury recommendation non-binding even when it calls for life imprisonment is constitutional.
- Jones v. United States, 527 U.S. 373 (1999)
- Oregon v. Guzek, 546 U.S. 517 (2006) – States may limit the evidence of innocence a defendant may present at his sentencing hearing to evidence already presented at his trial.
- Kansas v. Marsh, 548 U.S. 163 (2006) – Imposing the death penalty when mitigating and aggravating factors are in equipoise is constitutional.
- Kansas v. Carr, No. 14-449, 577 U.S. 108 (2016)
- Bosse v. Oklahoma, No. 15-9173, 580 U.S. 1 (2016)

=== Other ===
- Louisiana ex rel. Francis v. Resweber, 329 U.S. 459 (1947) — Re-execution after a failed attempt does not constitute cruel and unusual punishment nor double jeopardy.
- Pulley v. Harris, 465 U.S. 37 (1984) — A state appellate court, before it affirms a death sentence, is not required to compare the sentence in the case before it with the penalties imposed in similar cases if requested to do so by the prisoner.
- Whitmore v. Arkansas, 495 U.S. 149 (1990) — Mandatory appellate review is not required in death penalty cases.

== Fifth Amendment ==
- Beecher v. Alabama, 389 U.S. 35 (1967)
- United States v. Jackson, 390 U.S. 570 (1968)
- Brady v. United States, 397 U.S. 742 (1970)
- Estelle v. Smith, 451 U.S. 454 (1981)
- Kansas v. Cheever, 571 U.S. 87 (2013)

=== Double jeopardy ===
- Louisiana ex rel. Francis v. Resweber, 329 U.S. 459 (1947)
- Green v. United States, 355 U.S. 184 (1957)
- Bullington v. Missouri, 451 U.S. 430 (1981)
- Tibbs v. Florida, 457 U.S. 31 (1982)
- Arizona v. Rumsey, 467 U.S. 203 (1984)
- Spaziano v. Florida, 468 U.S. 447 (1984)
- Poland v. Arizona, 476 U.S. 147 (1986)
- Sattazahn v. Pennsylvania, 537 U.S. 101 (2003)

== Sixth Amendment ==
=== Trial procedure (sentencing) ===
- Witherspoon v. Illinois, 391 U.S. 510 (1968)
- Davis v. Georgia, 429 U.S. 122 (1976)
- Adams v. Texas, 448 U.S. 38 (1980)
- Spaziano v. Florida, 468 U.S. 447 (1984)
- Lockhart v. McCree, 476 U.S. 162 (1986)
- Gray v. Mississippi, 481 U.S. 648 (1987)
- Ross v. Oklahoma, 487 U.S. 81 (1988)
- Hillwin v. Florida, 490 U.S. 638 (1989)
- Clemons v. Mississippi, 494 U.S. 738 (1990)
- Walton v. Arizona, 497 U.S. 639 (1990)
- Ring v. Arizona, 536 U.S. 584 (2002) – A death sentence where the necessary aggravating factors are determined by a judge violates a defendant's constitutional right to a trial by jury, as the jury should determine if there are such factors sufficient to allow the death penalty.
- Hurst v. Florida, No. 14-7505, 577 U.S. 92 (2016) – Florida law giving judges the power to decide facts related to sentencing violates the Sixth Amendment in light of Ring, which requires a jury to determine if there are aggravating factors making the crime punishable by death.

=== Other ===
- United States v. Jackson, 390 U.S. 570 (1968)
- Brady v. United States, 397 U.S. 742 (1970)
- Mu'Min v. Virginia, 500 U.S. 415 (1991)
- Schad v. Arizona, 501 U.S. 624 (1991)
- Florida v. Nixon, 543 U.S. 175 (2004)
- Holmes v. South Carolina, 547 U.S. 319 (2006)
- Boyer v. Louisiana, 569 U.S. 238 (2013)
- McCoy v. Louisiana, No. 16-8255, 584 U.S. 414 (2018)
- United States v. Tsarnaev, No. 20-443, 595 U.S. 302 (2022)

== Fourteenth Amendment ==
=== Due Process ===
- Powell v. Alabama, 287 U.S. 45 (1932)
- Williams v. New York, 337 U.S. 241 (1949)
- Leland v. Oregon, 343 U.S. 790 (1952)
- Irvin v. Dowd, 366 U.S. 717 (1961)
- Beecher v. Alabama, 389 U.S. 35 (1967)
- Witherspoon v. Illinois, 391 U.S. 510 (1968)
- Beecher v. Alabama, 408 U.S. 234 (1972)
- Furman v. Georgia, 408 U.S. 238 (1972)
- Gregg v. Georgia, 428 U.S. 153 (1976)
- Proffitt v. Florida, 428 U.S. 242 (1976)
- Jurek v. Texas, 428 U.S. 262 (1976)
- Woodson v. North Carolina, 428 U.S. 280 (1976)
- Roberts v. Louisiana, 428 U.S. 325 (1976)
- Davis v. Georgia, 429 U.S. 122 (1976)
- Gardner v. Florida, 430 U.S. 349 (1977)
- Lockett v. Ohio, 438 U.S. 586 (1978)
- Godfrey v. Georgia, 446 U.S. 420 (1980)
- Beck v. Alabama, 447 U.S. 625 (1980)
- Adams v. Texas, 448 U.S. 38 (1980)
- Eddings v. Oklahoma, 455 U.S. 104 (1982)
- Zant v. Stephens, 462 U.S. 862 (1983)
- Barclay v. Florida, 463 U.S. 939 (1983)
- California v. Ramos, 463 U.S. 992 (1983)
- Spaziano v. Florida, 468 U.S. 447 (1984)
- Ake v. Oklahoma, 470 U.S. 68 (1985)
- Skipper v. South Carolina, 476 U.S. 1 (1986)
- Lockhart v. McCree, 476 U.S. 162 (1986)
- California v. Brown, 479 U.S. 538 (1987)
- Hitchcock v. Dugger, 481 U.S. 393 (1987)
- Gray v. Mississippi, 481 U.S. 648 (1987)
- Sumner v. Shuman, 483 U.S. 66 (1987)
- Mills v. Maryland, 486 U.S. 367 (1988)
- Ross v. Oklahoma, 487 U.S. 81 (1988)
- Boyde v. California, 494 U.S. 370 (1990)
- McKoy v. North Carolina, 494 U.S. 433 (1990)
- Whitmore v. Arkansas, 495 U.S. 149 (1990)
- Walton v. Arizona, 497 U.S. 639 (1990)
- Cage v. Louisiana, 498 U.S. 39 (1990)
- Mu'Min v. Virginia, 500 U.S. 415 (1991)
- Schad v. Arizona, 501 U.S. 624 (1991)
- Sochor v. Florida, 504 U.S. 527 (1992)
- Morgan v. Illinois, 504 U.S. 719 (1992) — A defendant may challenge for cause a prospective juror who would automatically vote to impose the death penalty in every capital case.
- Arave v. Creech, 507 U.S. 463 (1993)
- Johnson v. Texas, 509 U.S. 350 (1993)
- Simmons v. South Carolina, 512 U.S. 154 (1994)
- Cooper v. Oklahoma, 517 U.S. 348 (1996)
- Ramdass v. Angelone, 530 U.S. 156 (2000)
- Shafer v. South Carolina, 532 U.S. 36 (2001)
- Kelly v. South Carolina, 534 U.S. 246 (2002)
- Sattazahn v. Pennsylvania, 537 U.S. 101 (2003)
- Howell v. Mississippi, 543 U.S. 440 (2005)
- Deck v. Missouri, 544 U.S. 622 (2005)
- Holmes v. South Carolina, 547 U.S. 319 (2006)
- Lynch v. Arizona, No. 15-8366, 578 U.S. 613 (2016)
- Williams v. Pennsylvania, No. 15-5040, 579 U.S. 1 (2016)
- Kahler v. Kansas, No. 18-6135, 589 U.S. 271 (2020)
- Andrew v. White, No. 23-6573, 604 U.S. 86 (2025)

==== Exculpatory evidence ====
- Brady v. Maryland, 373 U.S. 83 (1963) — Prosecution must turn over to the defense all evidence that might exonerate the defendant.
- Connick v. Thompson, 563 U.S. 51 (2011)
- Glossip v. Oklahoma, No. 22-7466, 604 U.S. 226 (2025)

=== Equal Protection ===
- Louisiana ex rel. Francis v. Resweber, 329 U.S. 459 (1947)
- Batson v. Kentucky, 476 U.S. 79 (1986)
- McCleskey v. Kemp, 481 U.S. 279 (1987)
- Ford v. Georgia, 498 U.S. 411 (1991)
- Miller-El v. Dretke, 545 U.S. 231 (2005)
- Snyder v. Louisiana, 552 U.S. 472 (2008)
- Foster v. Chatman, No. 14-8349, 578 U.S. 488 (2016)
- Flowers v. Mississippi, No. 17-9572, 588 U.S. 284 (2019)

== Habeas corpus ==
- Moore v. Dempsey, 261 U.S. 86 (1923)
- In re Yamashita, 327 U.S. 1 (1946)
- Brown v. Allen, 344 U.S. 443 (1953)
- Chessman v. Teets, 354 U.S. 156 (1957)
- Irvin v. Dowd, 359 U.S. 394 (1959)
- Irvin v. Dowd, 366 U.S. 717 (1961)
- Boulden v. Holman, 394 U.S. 478 (1969)
- Brady v. United States, 397 U.S. 742 (1970)
- Maxwell v. Bishop, 398 U.S. 262 (1970)
- Estelle v. Smith, 451 U.S. 454 (1981)
- Zant v. Stephens, 462 U.S. 862 (1983)
- Wainwright v. Goode, 464 U.S. 78 (1983)
- Pulley v. Harris, 465 U.S. 37 (1984)
- Strickland v. Washington, 466 U.S. 668 (1984)
- Francis v. Franklin, 471 U.S. 307 (1985)
- Vasquez v. Hillery, 474 U.S. 254 (1986)
- Cabana v. Bullock, 474 U.S. 376 (1986)
- Lockhart v. McCree, 476 U.S. 162 (1986)
- Murray v. Carrier, 477 U.S. 478 (1986)
- McCleskey v. Kemp, 481 U.S. 279 (1987)
- Hitchcock v. Dugger, 481 U.S. 393 (1987)
- Sumner v. Shuman, 483 U.S. 66 (1987)
- Yates v. Aiken, 484 U.S. 211 (1988)
- Amadeo v. Zant, 486 U.S. 214 (1988)
- Maynard v. Cartwright, 486 U.S. 356 (1988)
- Dugger v. Adams, 489 U.S. 401 (1989)
- Butler v. McKellar, 494 U.S. 407 (1990)
- Saffle v. Parks, 494 U.S. 484 (1990)
- Sawyer v. Smith, 497 U.S. 227 (1990)
- Parker v. Dugger, 498 U.S. 308 (1991)
- McCleskey v. Zant, 499 U.S. 467 (1991)
- Coleman v. Thompson, 501 U.S. 722 (1991)
- Stringer v. Black, 503 U.S. 222 (1992)
- Lockhart v. Fretwell, 506 U.S. 364 (1993)
- Graham v. Collins, 506 U.S. 461 (1993)
- Godinez v. Moran, 509 U.S. 389 (1993)
- McFarland v. Scott, 512 U.S. 849 (1994)
- Kyles v. Whitley, 514 U.S. 419 (1995)
- Felker v. Turpin, 518 U.S. 651 (1996)
- Lambrix v. Singletary, 520 U.S. 518 (1997)
- Bracy v. Gramley, 520 U.S. 899 (1997)
- O'Dell v. Netherland, 521 U.S. 151 (1997)
- Calderon v. Thompson, 523 U.S. 538 (1998)
- Stewart v. Martinez-Villareal, 523 U.S. 637 (1998)
- Weeks v. Angelone, 528 U.S. 225 (2000)
- Terry Williams v. Taylor, 529 U.S. 362 (2000)
- Michael Williams v. Taylor, 529 U.S. 420 (2000)
- Ramdass v. Angelone, 530 U.S. 156 (2000)
- Penry v. Johnson, 532 U.S. 782 (2001)
- Mickens v. Taylor, 535 U.S. 162 (2002)
- Bell v. Cone, 535 U.S. 685 (2002)
- Horn v. Banks, 536 U.S. 266 (2002)
- Stewart v. Smith, 536 U.S. 856 (2002)
- Woodford v. Visciotti, 537 U.S. 19 (2002)
- Abdur'Rahman v. Bell, 537 U.S. 88 (2002)
- Miller-El v. Cockrell, 537 U.S. 322 (2003)
- Woodford v. Garceau, 538 U.S. 202 (2003)
- Wiggins v. Smith, 539 U.S. 510 (2003)
- Mitchell v. Esparza, 540 U.S. 12 (2003)
- Banks v. Dretke, 540 U.S. 668 (2004)
- Tennard v. Dretke, 542 U.S. 274 (2004)
- Schriro v. Summerlin, 542 U.S. 348 (2004) – Ring v. Arizona does not apply retroactively to cases already final on direct review.
- Beard v. Banks, 542 U.S. 406 (2004)
- Smith v. Texas, 543 U.S. 37 (2004)
- Bell v. Cone, 543 U.S. 447 (2005)
- Brown v. Payton, 544 U.S. 133 (2005)
- Rhines v. Weber, 544 U.S. 269 (2005)
- Bradshaw v. Stumpf, 545 U.S. 175 (2005)
- Miller-El v. Dretke, 545 U.S. 231 (2005)
- Rompilla v. Beard, 545 U.S. 374 (2005)
- Bell v. Thompson, 545 U.S. 794 (2005)
- Schriro v. Smith, 546 U.S. 6 (2005)
- Bradshaw v. Richey, 546 U.S. 74 (2005)
- Brown v. Sanders, 546 U.S. 212 (2006)
- Ayers v. Belmontes, 549 U.S. 7 (2006)
- Carey v. Musladin, 549 U.S. 70 (2006)
- Lawrence v. Florida, 549 U.S. 327 (2007)
- Abdul-Kabir v. Quarterman, 550 U.S. 233 (2007)
- Brewer v. Quarterman, 550 U.S. 286 (2007)
- Smith v. Texas, 550 U.S. 297 (2007)
- Schriro v. Landrigan, 550 U.S. 465 (2007)
- Roper v. Weaver, 550 U.S. 598 (2007)
- Uttecht v. Brown, 551 U.S. 1 (2007)
- Panetti v. Quarterman, 551 U.S. 930 (2007)
- Allen v. Siebert, 552 U.S. 3 (2007)
- Arave v. Hoffman, 552 U.S. 117 (2008)
- Bell v. Kelly, 555 U.S. 55 (2008)
- Harbison v. Bell, 556 U.S. 180 (2009) – Indigent death row inmates sentenced under state law have a right to federally funded habeas counsel in post-conviction state clemency proceedings, when the state has denied such counsel.
- Cone v. Bell, 556 U.S. 449 (2009)
- Bobby v. Bies, 556 U.S. 825 (2009)
- Corcoran v. Levenhagen, 558 U.S. 1 (2009)
- Bobby v. Van Hook, 558 U.S. 4 (2009)
- Wong v. Belmontes, 558 U.S. 15 (2009)
- Porter v. McCollum, 558 U.S. 30 (2009)
- Smith v. Spisak, 558 U.S. 139 (2010)
- Wellons v. Hall, 558 U.S. 220 (2010)
- Wood v. Allen, 558 U.S. 290 (2010)
- Thaler v. Haynes, 559 U.S. 43 (2010)
- Jefferson v. Upton, 560 U.S. 284 (2010)
- Holland v. Florida, 560 U.S. 631 (2010)
- Magwood v. Patterson, 561 U.S. 320 (2010)
- Sears v. Upton, 561 U.S. 945 (2010)
- Wilson v. Corcoran, 562 U.S. 1 (2010)
- Cullen v. Pinholster, 563 U.S. 170 (2011)
- Bobby v. Mitts, 563 U.S. 395 (2011)
- Bobby v. Dixon, 565 U.S. 23 (2011)
- Maples v. Thomas, 565 U.S. 266 (2012)
- Wetzel v. Lambert, 565 U.S. 520 (2012)
- Martel v. Clair, 565 U.S. 648 (2012)
- Parker v. Matthews, 567 U.S. 37 (2012)
- Ryan v. Valencia Gonzales, 568 U.S. 57 (2013)
- Trevino v. Thaler, 569 U.S. 413 (2013)
- Ryan v. Schad, 570 U.S. 521 (2013)
- Hinton v. Alabama, 571 U.S. 263 (2014)
- White v. Woodall, 572 U.S. 415 (2014)
- Lopez v. Smith, 574 U.S. 1 (2014)
- Jennings v. Stephens, 574 U.S. 271 (2015)
- Christeson v. Roper, 574 U.S. 373 (2015)
- Davis v. Ayala, No. 13-1428, 576 U.S. 257 (2015)
- Brumfield v. Cain, No. 13-1433, 576 U.S. 305 (2015)
- White v. Wheeler, No. 14-1372, 577 U.S. ___ (2015)
- Wearry v. Cain, No. 14-10008, 577 U.S. ___ (2016)
- Foster v. Chatman, No. 14-8349, 578 U.S. ___ (2016)
- Williams v. Pennsylvania, No. 15-5040, 579 U.S. ___ (2016)
- Buck v. Davis, No. 15-8049, 580 U.S. ___ (2017)
- Rippo v. Baker, No. 16-6316, 580 U.S. ___ (2017)
- McWilliams v. Dunn, No. 16-5294, 582 U.S. ___ (2017) – Capital defendants are entitled to a court-appointed medical expert for their defense.
- Jenkins v. Hutton, No. 16-1116, 582 U.S. ___ (2017)
- Davila v. Davis, No. 16-6219, 582 U.S. ___ (2017)
- Dunn v. Madison, No. 17-193, 583 U.S. ___ (2017)
- Tharpe v. Sellers, No. 17-6075, 583 U.S. ___ (2018)
- Ayestas v. Davis, No. 16-6795, 584 U.S. ___ (2018)
- Wilson v. Sellers, No. 16-6855, 584 U.S. ___ (2018)
- Shoop v. Hill, No. 18-56, 586 U.S. ___ (2019)
- McKinney v. Arizona, No. 18-1109, 589 U.S. ___ (2020)
- Andrus v. Texas, No. 18-9674, 590 U.S. ___ (2020)
- Shinn v. Kayer, No. 19-1302, 592 U.S. ___ (2020)
- Mays v. Hines, No. 20-507, 592 U.S. ___ (2021)
- Dunn v. Reeves, No. 20-1084, 594 U.S. ___ (2021)
- Shinn v. Ramirez, No. 20-1009, 596 U.S. ___ (2022)
- Shoop v. Twyford, No. 21-511, 596 U.S. ___ (2022)
- Nance v. Ward, No. 21-439, 597 U.S. ___ (2022)
- Cruz v. Arizona, No. 21-846, 598 U.S. ___ (2023)
- Thornell v. Jones, No. 22-982, 602 U.S. ___ (2024)
- Hamm v. Smith, No. 23-167, 604 U.S. ___ (2024)

== Summary reversal and vacatur ==
- Beecher v. Alabama, 389 U.S. 35 (1967)
- Beecher v. Alabama, 408 U.S. 234 (1972)
- Davis v. Georgia, 429 U.S. 122 (1976)
- Wainwright v. Goode, 464 U.S. 78 (1983)
- Espinosa v. Florida, 505 U.S. 1079 (1992)
- Horn v. Banks, 536 U.S. 266 (2002)
- Stewart v. Smith, 536 U.S. 856 (2002)
- United States v. Bass, 536 U.S. 862 (2002)
- Woodford v. Visciotti, 537 U.S. 19 (2002)
- Mitchell v. Esparza, 540 U.S. 12 (2003)
- Smith v. Texas, 543 U.S. 37 (2004)
- Bell v. Cone, 543 U.S. 447 (2005)
- Schriro v. Smith, 546 U.S. 6 (2005)
- Bradshaw v. Richey, 546 U.S. 74 (2005)
- Allen v. Siebert, 552 U.S. 3 (2007)
- Arave v. Hoffman, 552 U.S. 117 (2008)
- Corcoran v. Levenhagen, 558 U.S. 1 (2009)
- Bobby v. Van Hook, 558 U.S. 4 (2009)
- Wong v. Belmontes, 558 U.S. 15 (2009)
- Porter v. McCollum, 558 U.S. 30 (2009)
- Wellons v. Hall, 558 U.S. 220 (2010)
- Thaler v. Haynes, 559 U.S. 43 (2010)
- Jefferson v. Upton, 560 U.S. 284 (2010)
- Sears v. Upton, 561 U.S. 945 (2010)
- Wilson v. Corcoran, 562 U.S. 1 (2010)
- Bobby v. Mitts, 563 U.S. 395 (2011)
- Bobby v. Dixon, 565 U.S. 23 (2011)
- Wetzel v. Lambert, 565 U.S. 520 (2012)
- Parker v. Matthews, 567 U.S. 37 (2012)
- Ryan v. Schad, 570 U.S. 521 (2013)
- Hinton v. Alabama, 571 U.S. 263 (2014)
- Lopez v. Smith, 574 U.S. 1 (2014)
- Christeson v. Roper, 574 U.S. 373 (2015)
- White v. Wheeler, No. 14-1372, 577 U.S. ___ (2015)
- Wearry v. Cain, No. 14-10008, 577 U.S. ___ (2016)
- Lynch v. Arizona, No. 15-8366, 578 U.S. ___ (2016)
- Bosse v. Oklahoma, No. 15-9173, 580 U.S. ___ (2016)
- Rippo v. Baker, No. 16-6316, 580 U.S. ___ (2017)
- Jenkins v. Hutton, No. 16-1116, 582 U.S. ___ (2017)
- Dunn v. Madison, No. 17-193, 583 U.S. ___ (2017)
- Tharpe v. Sellers, No. 17-6075, 583 U.S. ___ (2018)
- Shoop v. Hill, No. 18-56, 586 U.S. ___ (2019)
- Moore v. Texas, No. 18-443, 586 U.S. ___ (2019)
- Andrus v. Texas, No. 18-9674, 590 U.S. ___ (2020)
- Barr v. Lee, No. 20A8, 591 U.S. ___ (2020)
- Shinn v. Kayer, No. 19-1302, 592 U.S. ___ (2020)
- Mays v. Hines, No. 20-507, 592 U.S. ___ (2021)
- Dunn v. Reeves, No. 20-1084, 594 U.S. ___ (2021)
- Hamm v. Smith, No. 23-167, 604 U.S. ___ (2024)
- Andrew v. White, No. 23-6573, 604 U.S. ___ (2025)

== International law ==
- Breard v. Greene, 523 U.S. 371 (1998)
- Federal Republic of Germany v. United States, 526 U.S. 111 (1999)
- Medellín v. Dretke, 544 U.S. 660 (2005)
- Medellín v. Texas, 552 U.S. 491 (2008)
- Leal Garcia v. Texas, 564 U.S. 940 (2011) – Courts cannot stay an execution on the grounds that Congress might eventually enact a statute to enforce an international law.

== Miscellaneous ==
- Rooney v. North Dakota, 196 U.S. 319 (1905) — Adoption of private execution over public execution after sentence does not violate the Ex post facto clause.
- Malloy v. South Carolina, 237 U.S. 180 (1915) — Retroactively changing the execution method does not violate the Ex post facto clause.
- Schick v. Reed, 419 U.S. 256 (1974)
- Loving v. United States, 517 U.S. 748 (1996)
- McMillian v. Monroe County, Alabama, 520 U.S. 781 (1997)
- United States v. Bass, 536 U.S. 862 (2002)
- Skinner v. Switzer, 562 U.S. 521 (2011)
- Sharp v. Murphy, No. 17-1107, 591 U.S. ___ (2020)
- Ramirez v. Collier, No. 21-5592, 595 U.S. ___ (2022)
- Reed v. Goertz, No. 21-442, 598 U.S. ___ (2023)

== Chronological listing ==
- Coleman v. Tennessee, 97 U.S. 509 (1878)
- Wilkerson v. Utah, 99 U.S. 130 (1879)
- In re Kemmler, 136 U.S. 436 (1890)
- Rooney v. North Dakota, 196 U.S. 319 (1905)
- Malloy v. South Carolina, 237 U.S. 180 (1915)
- Moore v. Dempsey, 261 U.S. 86 (1923)
- Powell v. Alabama, 287 U.S. 45 (1932)
- In re Yamashita, 327 U.S. 1 (1946)
- Louisiana ex rel. Francis v. Resweber, 329 U.S. 459 (1947)
- Williams v. New York, 337 U.S. 241 (1949)
- Leland v. Oregon, 343 U.S. 790 (1952)
- Brown v. Allen, 344 U.S. 443 (1953)
- Chessman v. Teets, 354 U.S. 156 (1957)
- Green v. United States, 355 U.S. 184 (1957)
- Irvin v. Dowd, 359 U.S. 394 (1959)
- Irvin v. Dowd, 366 U.S. 717 (1961)
- Brady v. Maryland, 373 U.S. 83 (1963)
- Beecher v. Alabama, 389 U.S. 35 (1967)
- United States v. Jackson, 390 U.S. 570 (1968)
- Witherspoon v. Illinois, 391 U.S. 510 (1968)
- Boulden v. Holman, 394 U.S. 478 (1969)
- Brady v. United States, 397 U.S. 742 (1970)
- Maxwell v. Bishop, 398 U.S. 262 (1970)
- Beecher v. Alabama, 408 U.S. 234 (1972)
- Furman v. Georgia, 408 U.S. 238 (1972)
- Schick v. Reed, 419 U.S. 256 (1974)
- Gregg v. Georgia, 428 U.S. 153 (1976)
- Proffitt v. Florida, 428 U.S. 242 (1976)
- Jurek v. Texas, 428 U.S. 262 (1976)
- Woodson v. North Carolina, 428 U.S. 280 (1976)
- Roberts v. Louisiana, 428 U.S. 325 (1976)
- Davis v. Georgia, 429 U.S. 122 (1976)
- Gardner v. Florida, 430 U.S. 349 (1977)
- Coker v. Georgia, 433 U.S. 584 (1977)
- Lockett v. Ohio, 438 U.S. 586 (1978)
- Godfrey v. Georgia, 446 U.S. 420 (1980)
- Beck v. Alabama, 447 U.S. 625 (1980)
- Adams v. Texas, 448 U.S. 38 (1980)
- Bullington v. Missouri, 451 U.S. 430 (1981)
- Estelle v. Smith, 451 U.S. 454 (1981)
- Eddings v. Oklahoma, 455 U.S. 104 (1982)
- Tibbs v. Florida, 457 U.S. 31 (1982)
- Enmund v. Florida, 458 U.S. 782 (1982)
- Zant v. Stephens, 462 U.S. 862 (1983)
- Barclay v. Florida, 463 U.S. 939 (1983)
- California v. Ramos, 463 U.S. 992 (1983)
- Wainwright v. Goode, 464 U.S. 78 (1983)
- Pulley v. Harris, 465 U.S. 37 (1984)
- Strickland v. Washington, 466 U.S. 668 (1984)
- Arizona v. Rumsey, 467 U.S. 203 (1984)
- Spaziano v. Florida, 468 U.S. 447 (1984)
- Ake v. Oklahoma, 470 U.S. 68 (1985)
- Francis v. Franklin, 471 U.S. 307 (1985)
- Caldwell v. Mississippi, 472 U.S. 320 (1985)
- Vasquez v. Hillery, 474 U.S. 254 (1986)
- Cabana v. Bullock, 474 U.S. 376 (1986)
- Skipper v. South Carolina, 476 U.S. 1 (1986)
- Batson v. Kentucky, 476 U.S. 79 (1986)
- Poland v. Arizona, 476 U.S. 147 (1986)
- Lockhart v. McCree, 476 U.S. 162 (1986)
- Ford v. Wainwright, 477 U.S. 399 (1986)
- Murray v. Carrier, 477 U.S. 478 (1986)
- California v. Brown, 479 U.S. 538 (1987)
- Tison v. Arizona, 481 U.S. 137 (1987)
- McCleskey v. Kemp, 481 U.S. 279 (1987)
- Hitchcock v. Dugger, 481 U.S. 393 (1987)
- Gray v. Mississippi, 481 U.S. 648 (1987)
- Booth v. Maryland, 482 U.S. 496 (1987)
- Sumner v. Shuman, 483 U.S. 66 (1987)
- Yates v. Aiken, 484 U.S. 211 (1988)
- Amadeo v. Zant, 486 U.S. 214 (1988)
- Maynard v. Cartwright, 486 U.S. 356 (1988)
- Mills v. Maryland, 486 U.S. 367 (1988)
- Ross v. Oklahoma, 487 U.S. 81 (1988)
- Thompson v. Oklahoma, 487 U.S. 815 (1988)
- Dugger v. Adams, 489 U.S. 401 (1989)
- Hillwin v. Florida, 490 U.S. 638 (1989)
- South Carolina v. Gathers, 490 U.S. 805 (1989)
- Penry v. Lynaugh, 492 U.S. 302 (1989)
- Stanford v. Kentucky, 492 U.S. 361 (1989)
- Blystone v. Pennsylvania, 494 U.S. 299 (1990)
- Boyde v. California, 494 U.S. 370 (1990)
- Butler v. McKellar, 494 U.S. 407 (1990)
- McKoy v. North Carolina, 494 U.S. 433 (1990)
- Saffle v. Parks, 494 U.S. 484 (1990)
- Clemons v. Mississippi, 494 U.S. 738 (1990)
- Whitmore v. Arkansas, 495 U.S. 149 (1990)
- Sawyer v. Smith, 497 U.S. 227 (1990)
- Walton v. Arizona, 497 U.S. 639 (1990)
- Shell v. Mississippi, 498 U.S. 1 (1990)
- Cage v. Louisiana, 498 U.S. 39 (1990)
- Parker v. Dugger, 498 U.S. 308 (1991)
- Ford v. Georgia, 498 U.S. 411 (1991)
- Arizona v. Fulminante, 499 U.S. 279 (1991)
- McCleskey v. Zant, 499 U.S. 467 (1991)
- Lankford v. Idaho, 500 U.S. 110 (1991)
- Mu'Min v. Virginia, 500 U.S. 415 (1991)
- Schad v. Arizona, 501 U.S. 624 (1991)
- Coleman v. Thompson, 501 U.S. 722 (1991)
- Payne v. Tennessee, 501 U.S. 808 (1991)
- Stringer v. Black, 503 U.S. 222 (1992)
- Sochor v. Florida, 504 U.S. 527 (1992)
- Morgan v. Illinois, 504 U.S. 719 (1992)
- Espinosa v. Florida, 505 U.S. 1079 (1992)
- Lockhart v. Fretwell, 506 U.S. 364 (1993)
- Graham v. Collins, 506 U.S. 461 (1993)
- Arave v. Creech, 507 U.S. 463 (1993)
- Johnson v. Texas, 509 U.S. 350 (1993)
- Godinez v. Moran, 509 U.S. 389 (1993)
- Simmons v. South Carolina, 512 U.S. 154 (1994)
- McFarland v. Scott, 512 U.S. 849 (1994)
- Harris v. Alabama, 513 U.S. 504 (1995)
- Kyles v. Whitley, 514 U.S. 419 (1995)
- Cooper v. Oklahoma, 517 U.S. 348 (1996)
- Loving v. United States, 517 U.S. 748 (1996)
- Felker v. Turpin, 518 U.S. 651 (1996)
- Lambrix v. Singletary, 520 U.S. 518 (1997)
- McMillian v. Monroe County, Alabama, 520 U.S. 781 (1997)
- Bracy v. Gramley, 520 U.S. 899 (1997)
- O'Dell v. Netherland, 521 U.S. 151 (1997)
- Breard v. Greene, 523 U.S. 371 (1998)
- Calderon v. Thompson, 523 U.S. 538 (1998)
- Stewart v. Martinez-Villareal, 523 U.S. 637 (1998)
- Federal Republic of Germany v. United States, 526 U.S. 111 (1999)
- Stewart v. LaGrand, 526 U.S. 115 (1999)
- Jones v. United States, 527 U.S. 373 (1999)
- Weeks v. Angelone, 528 U.S. 225 (2000)
- Terry Williams v. Taylor, 529 U.S. 362 (2000)
- Michael Williams v. Taylor, 529 U.S. 420 (2000)
- Ramdass v. Angelone, 530 U.S. 156 (2000)
- Shafer v. South Carolina, 532 U.S. 36 (2001)
- Penry v. Johnson, 532 U.S. 782 (2001)
- Kelly v. South Carolina, 534 U.S. 246 (2002)
- Mickens v. Taylor, 535 U.S. 162 (2002)
- Bell v. Cone, 535 U.S. 685 (2002)
- Horn v. Banks, 536 U.S. 266 (2002)
- Atkins v. Virginia, 536 U.S. 304 (2002)
- Stewart v. Smith, 536 U.S. 856 (2002)
- United States v. Bass, 536 U.S. 862 (2002)
- Woodford v. Visciotti, 537 U.S. 19 (2002)
- Abdur'Rahman v. Bell, 537 U.S. 88 (2002)
- Sattazahn v. Pennsylvania, 537 U.S. 101 (2003)
- Miller-El v. Cockrell, 537 U.S. 322 (2003)
- Woodford v. Garceau, 538 U.S. 202 (2003)
- Wiggins v. Smith, 539 U.S. 510 (2003)
- Mitchell v. Esparza, 540 U.S. 12 (2003)
- Banks v. Dretke, 540 U.S. 668 (2004)
- Nelson v. Campbell, 541 U.S. 637 (2004)
- Tennard v. Dretke, 542 U.S. 274 (2004)
- Schriro v. Summerlin, 542 U.S. 348 (2004)
- Beard v. Banks, 542 U.S. 406 (2004)
- Smith v. Texas, 543 U.S. 37 (2004)
- Florida v. Nixon, 543 U.S. 175 (2004)
- Howell v. Mississippi, 543 U.S. 440 (2005)
- Bell v. Cone, 543 U.S. 447 (2005)
- Roper v. Simmons, 543 U.S. 551 (2005)
- Brown v. Payton, 544 U.S. 133 (2005)
- Rhines v. Weber, 544 U.S. 269 (2005)
- Deck v. Missouri, 544 U.S. 622 (2005)
- Medellín v. Dretke, 544 U.S. 660 (2005)
- Bradshaw v. Stumpf, 545 U.S. 175 (2005)
- Miller-El v. Dretke, 545 U.S. 231 (2005)
- Rompilla v. Beard, 545 U.S. 374 (2005)
- Bell v. Thompson, 545 U.S. 794 (2005)
- Schriro v. Smith, 546 U.S. 6 (2005)
- Bradshaw v. Richey, 546 U.S. 74 (2005)
- Brown v. Sanders, 546 U.S. 212 (2006)
- Oregon v. Guzek, 546 U.S. 517 (2006)
- Holmes v. South Carolina, 547 U.S. 319 (2006)
- Hill v. McDonough, 547 U.S. 573 (2006)
- Kansas v. Marsh, 548 U.S. 163 (2006)
- Ayers v. Belmontes, 549 U.S. 7 (2006)
- Carey v. Musladin, 549 U.S. 70 (2006)
- Lawrence v. Florida, 549 U.S. 327 (2007)
- Abdul-Kabir v. Quarterman, 550 U.S. 233 (2007)
- Brewer v. Quarterman, 550 U.S. 286 (2007)
- Smith v. Texas, 550 U.S. 297 (2007)
- Schriro v. Landrigan, 550 U.S. 465 (2007)
- Roper v. Weaver, 550 U.S. 598 (2007)
- Uttecht v. Brown, 551 U.S. 1 (2007)
- Panetti v. Quarterman, 551 U.S. 930 (2007)
- Allen v. Siebert, 552 U.S. 3 (2007)
- Arave v. Hoffman, 552 U.S. 117 (2008)
- Snyder v. Louisiana, 552 U.S. 472 (2008)
- Medellín v. Texas, 552 U.S. 491 (2008)
- Baze v. Rees, 553 U.S. 35 (2008)
- Bell v. Kelly, 555 U.S. 55 (2008)
- Harbison v. Bell, 556 U.S. 180 (2009)
- Cone v. Bell, 556 U.S. 449 (2009)
- Bobby v. Bies, 556 U.S. 825 (2009)
- Corcoran v. Levenhagen, 558 U.S. 1 (2009)
- Bobby v. Van Hook, 558 U.S. 4 (2009)
- Wong v. Belmontes, 558 U.S. 15 (2009)
- Porter v. McCollum, 558 U.S. 30 (2009)
- Smith v. Spisak, 558 U.S. 139 (2010)
- Wellons v. Hall, 558 U.S. 220 (2010)
- Wood v. Allen, 558 U.S. 290 (2010)
- Thaler v. Haynes, 559 U.S. 43 (2010)
- Jefferson v. Upton, 560 U.S. 284 (2010)
- Holland v. Florida, 560 U.S. 631 (2010)
- Magwood v. Patterson, 561 U.S. 320 (2010)
- Sears v. Upton, 561 U.S. 945 (2010)
- Wilson v. Corcoran, 562 U.S. 1 (2010)
- Skinner v. Switzer, 562 U.S. 521 (2011)
- Connick v. Thompson, 563 U.S. 51 (2011)
- Cullen v. Pinholster, 563 U.S. 170 (2011)
- Bobby v. Mitts, 563 U.S. 395 (2011)
- Leal Garcia v. Texas, 564 U.S. 940 (2011)
- Bobby v. Dixon, 565 U.S. 23 (2011)
- Maples v. Thomas, 565 U.S. 266 (2012)
- Wetzel v. Lambert, 565 U.S. 520 (2012)
- Martel v. Clair, 565 U.S. 648 (2012)
- Parker v. Matthews, 567 U.S. 37 (2012)
- Ryan v. Valencia Gonzales, 568 U.S. 57 (2013)
- Boyer v. Louisiana, 569 U.S. 238 (2013)
- Trevino v. Thaler, 569 U.S. 413 (2013)
- Ryan v. Schad, 570 U.S. 521 (2013)
- Kansas v. Cheever, 571 U.S. 87 (2013)
- Hinton v. Alabama, 571 U.S. 263 (2014)
- White v. Woodall, 572 U.S. 415 (2014)
- Hall v. Florida, 572 U.S. 701 (2014)
- Lopez v. Smith, 574 U.S. 1 (2014)
- Jennings v. Stephens, 574 U.S. 271 (2015)
- Christeson v. Roper, 574 U.S. 373 (2015)
- Davis v. Ayala, No. 13-1428, 576 U.S. ___ (2015)
- Brumfield v. Cain, No. 13-1433, 576 U.S. ___ (2015)
- Glossip v. Gross, No. 14-7955, 576 U.S. ___ (2015)
- White v. Wheeler, No. 14-1372, 577 U.S. ___ (2015)
- Hurst v. Florida, No. 14-7505, 577 U.S. ___ (2016)
- Kansas v. Carr, No. 14-449, 577 U.S. ___ (2016)
- Wearry v. Cain, No. 14-10008, 577 U.S. ___ (2016)
- Foster v. Chatman, No. 14-8349, 578 U.S. ___ (2016)
- Lynch v. Arizona, No. 15-8366, 578 U.S. ___ (2016)
- Williams v. Pennsylvania, No. 15-5040, 579 U.S. ___ (2016)
- Bosse v. Oklahoma, No. 15-9173, 580 U.S. ___ (2016)
- Buck v. Davis, No. 15-8049, 580 U.S. ___ (2017)
- Rippo v. Baker, No. 16-6316, 580 U.S. ___ (2017)
- Moore v. Texas, No. 15-797, 581 U.S. ___ (2017)
- McWilliams v. Dunn, No. 16-5294, 582 U.S. ___ (2017)
- Jenkins v. Hutton, No. 16-1116, 582 U.S. ___ (2017)
- Davila v. Davis, No. 16-6219, 582 U.S. ___ (2017)
- Dunn v. Madison, No. 17-193, 583 U.S. ___ (2017)
- Tharpe v. Sellers, No. 17-6075, 583 U.S. ___ (2018)
- Ayestas v. Davis, No. 16-6795, 584 U.S. ___ (2018)
- Wilson v. Sellers, No. 16-6855, 584 U.S. ___ (2018)
- McCoy v. Louisiana, No. 16-8255, 584 U.S. ___ (2018)
- Shoop v. Hill, No. 18-56, 586 U.S. ___ (2019)
- Moore v. Texas, No. 18-443, 586 U.S. ___ (2019)
- Madison v. Alabama, No. 17-7505, 586 U.S. ___ (2019)
- Bucklew v. Precythe, No. 17-8151, 587 U.S. ___ (2019)
- Flowers v. Mississippi, No. 17-9572, 588 U.S. ___ (2019)
- McKinney v. Arizona, No. 18-1109, 589 U.S. ___ (2020)
- Kahler v. Kansas, No. 18-6135, 589 U.S. ___ (2020)
- Andrus v. Texas, No. 18-9674, 590 U.S. ___ (2020)
- Sharp v. Murphy, No. 17-1107, 591 U.S. ___ (2020)
- Barr v. Lee, No. 20A8, 591 U.S. ___ (2020)
- Shinn v. Kayer, No. 19-1302, 592 U.S. ___ (2020)
- Mays v. Hines, No. 20-507, 592 U.S. ___ (2021)
- Dunn v. Reeves, No. 20-1084, 594 U.S. ___ (2021)
- United States v. Tsarnaev, No. 20-443, 595 U.S. ___ (2022)
- Ramirez v. Collier, No. 21-5592, 595 U.S. ___ (2022)
- Shinn v. Ramirez, No. 20-1009, 596 U.S. ___ (2022)
- Shoop v. Twyford, No. 21-511, 596 U.S. ___ (2022)
- Nance v. Ward, No. 21-439, 597 U.S. ___ (2022)
- Cruz v. Arizona, No. 21-846, 598 U.S. ___ (2023)
- Reed v. Goertz, No. 21-442, 598 U.S. ___ (2023)
- Thornell v. Jones, No. 22-982, 602 U.S. ___ (2024)
- Hamm v. Smith, No. 23-167, 604 U.S. ___ (2024)
- Andrew v. White, No. 23-6573, 604 U.S. ___ (2025)
- Glossip v. Oklahoma, No. 22-7466, 604 U.S. ___ (2025)
- Hamm v. Smith, No. 24-872, 608 U.S. ___ (2026)
- Whitton v. Dixon, No. 25-580, 608 U.S. ___ (2026)
- Guerrero v. Johnson, No. 25-1003, ___ U.S. ___ (2027)

== See also ==
- Capital punishment in the United States
