= Sumner v. Shuman =

- Supreme Court of the United States

Argued April 20, 1987 Decided June 22, 1987
- Full case name: Sumner v. Shuman
- Docket no.: 86-246
- Citations: 483 U.S. 66 (more)
- Argument: Oral argument
- Opinion announcement: Opinion announcement

Holding
- A mandatory death penalty for a prison inmate convicted of murder while serving a life sentence without possibility of parole is unconstitutional.

Court membership
- Chief Justice William Rehnquist Associate Justices William J. Brennan Jr. · Byron White; Thurgood Marshall · Harry Blackmun; Lewis F. Powell Jr. · John P. Stevens; Sandra Day O'Connor · Antonin Scalia

Case opinions
- Majority: Blackmun, joined by Brennan, Marshall, Powell, Stevens, O'Connor
- Dissent: Scalia, joined by Rehnquist, White

Laws applied
- Eighth Amendment to the United States Constitution, Fourteenth Amendment to the United States Constitution

Sumner v. Shuman, 483 U.S. 66 (1987), was a case in which the Supreme Court of the United States held that a mandatory death penalty for a prison inmate who is convicted of murder while serving a life sentence without possibility of parole is unconstitutional. The decision in this case was a significant development in the Court's capital punishment jurisprudence, further clarifying the limits on the application of the death penalty in the United States.

== Background ==
The case of Sumner v. Shuman arose from the murder of a fellow inmate by Raymond Wallace Shuman, who was already serving a life sentence without the possibility of parole in a Nevada state prison. Under Nevada law at the time, the imposition of the death penalty was mandatory for inmates convicted of murder while serving a life sentence without parole. Shuman was subsequently convicted of the murder and sentenced to death, as required by the Nevada statute. Appealing his sentence, Shuman argued that the mandatory death penalty imposed in his case violated the Eighth Amendment's prohibition against cruel and unusual punishment, as well as the Fourteenth Amendment's guarantee of due process of law. The case eventually reached the Supreme Court of the United States.

== Opinion of the Court ==
In a 6–3 decision, the Supreme Court held that the mandatory imposition of the death penalty on inmates convicted of murder while serving a life sentence without the possibility of parole was unconstitutional. Writing for the majority, Justice Harry Blackmun reasoned that the Eighth Amendment requires individualized sentencing in capital cases, allowing for the consideration of mitigating factors related to the defendant's character or the circumstances of the crime.

The Court cited its previous decisions in Woodson v. North Carolina, 428 U.S. 280 (1976), and Lockett v. Ohio, 438 U.S. 586 (1978), which had invalidated mandatory death penalty statutes for similar reasons. The Court reasoned that there was no compelling justification for treating inmates serving life sentences without parole differently from other defendants in capital cases. As a result, the Court held that the Nevada statute violated the Constitution by denying Shuman the opportunity to present mitigating evidence before a jury or judge to potentially avoid a death sentence.

=== Dissent ===
Justice Antonin Scalia, joined by Chief Justice William H. Rehnquist and Justice Byron White, dissented from the majority opinion. The dissent argued that the Court's decision was inconsistent with its previous decisions upholding mandatory minimum sentences in non-capital cases, as well as with the Court's prior decisions in capital cases.

== Impact ==
The decision in Sumner v. Shuman had a significant impact on the application of the death penalty in the United States, as it further clarified the limits on when and how the death penalty may be imposed. Following the decision, states were required to revise their death penalty statutes to ensure that they provided for individualized sentencing in all capital cases, including those involving inmates serving life sentences without the possibility of parole.

== Subsequent developments ==
Shuman died in prison on February 3, 2018. Having spent 59 years, 7 months, and 20 days in prison, he was one of Nevada's longest serving inmates.

== See also ==
- List of United States Supreme Court decisions on capital punishment
