= Rooney v. North Dakota =

- Supreme Court of the United States

Decided January 23, 1905
- Full case name: Rooney v. North Dakota
- Citations: 196 U.S. 319 (more)

Holding
- The adoption of private execution over public execution after sentence does not violate the Ex Post Facto Clause.

Court membership
- Chief Justice Melville Fuller Associate Justices John M. Harlan · David J. Brewer; Henry B. Brown · Edward D. White; Rufus W. Peckham · Joseph McKenna; Oliver W. Holmes Jr. · William R. Day

Case opinion
- Majority: Harlan, joined by unanimous

Laws applied
- Ex Post Facto Clause

Rooney v. North Dakota, 196 U.S. 319 (1905), was a United States Supreme Court case in which the court held that the adoption of private execution over public execution after sentencing does not violate the Ex Post Facto Clause.

== Background ==
John Rooney was convicted of murder and sentenced to death. At the time he committed the murder, North Dakota law said that a condemned person would be confined in the county jail for at least three months and no more than six months after the judgment before they would be execution. The law said that the condemned person was to be hanged by the sheriff in the yard of the jail of the county in which the conviction occurred. In 1903, before Rooney was pronounced guilty, the law changed to require confinement for at least six months and no more than nine months. The law now said that the condemned person would be hanged within an enclosure at the penitentiary by the warden or his deputy.

Rooney argued that this was a different law—that there was no law allowing people to be executed inside of a prison when he committed the crime. Therefore, said Rooney, applying this sentence to him was ex post facto and void.

== Opinion of the court ==
The Supreme Court issued an opinion on January 23, 1905.

The Supreme Court rejected Rooney's argument, holding that "the place of execution, when the punishment is death, within the limits of the state, is of no practical consequence to the criminal."

== Subsequent developments ==
Rooney was hanged at the North Dakota State Penitentiary in Bismarck on 17 October 1905. It was the first execution in North Dakota's history to be held in a prison as opposed to in public. It was also the last execution in North Dakota before capital punishment was abolished by the state in 1973. Other condemned people had their sentences reduced to natural life in prison.

== See also ==
- List of United States Supreme Court decisions on capital punishment
