= Nance v. Ward =

- Supreme Court of the United States

Argued April 25, 2022 Decided June 23, 2022
- Full case name: Michael Nance v. Timothy C. Ward, Commissioner, Georgia Department of Corrections, et al.
- Docket no.: 21-439
- Citations: 597 U.S. 159 (more) 2022 WL 2251307; 2022 U.S. LEXIS 3054
- Argument: Oral argument
- Decision: Opinion

Holding
- Section 1983 remains an appropriate vehicle for a prisoner's method-of-execution claim where, as here, the prisoner proposes an alternative method not authorized by the State’s death-penalty statute.

Court membership
- Chief Justice John Roberts Associate Justices Clarence Thomas · Stephen Breyer; Samuel Alito · Sonia Sotomayor; Elena Kagan · Neil Gorsuch; Brett Kavanaugh · Amy Coney Barrett

Case opinions
- Majority: Kagan, joined by Roberts, Breyer, Sotomayor, Kavanaugh
- Dissent: Barrett, joined by Thomas, Alito, Gorsuch

Laws applied
- U.S. Const. amend. VIII

Nance v. Ward, 597 U.S. 159 (2022), was a United States Supreme Court case related to death row inmates' as-applied challenges to methods of execution.

== Background ==
2025 mugshot of Michael Nance

On December 18, 1993, Michael Nance robbed a bank then shot and killed Gabor Balogh during a carjacking. He was convicted and sentenced to death soon thereafter. In January 2020, Nance filed an as-applied challenge to Georgia's execution protocol under 42 U.S.C. § 1983, asserting its use of lethal injection would subject him to a level of pain that is unconstitutional under the Eighth Amendment to the United States Constitution. The district court dismissed Nance's claim on the basis that it was meritless and was untimely.

The United States Court of Appeals for the Eleventh Circuit found that Nance's request for a firing squad, which is not authorized by Georgia law, constituted an attack on his death sentence and thus had to be filed in the context of a writ of habeas corpus. Then, the court found the request was "second or successive," and vacated and remanded for the district court to dismiss for lack of jurisdiction. Judge Beverly B. Martin dissented. The court denied rehearing en banc over the dissent of Judge Charles R. Wilson, who was joined by two other judges. Nance filed a petition for a writ of certiorari.

== Supreme Court ==
Certiorari was granted in the case on January 14, 2022. Oral arguments were held on April 25, 2022.

=== Ruling ===
On June 23, 2022, the Supreme Court reversed the Eleventh Circuit in a 5–4 vote. Justice Elena Kagan wrote the majority, and Justice Amy Coney Barrett wrote the dissent.

The court ruled that a claim for an alternative methods of execution that is not authorized by the state can still be addressed under 42 U.S.C. § 1983 and does not need to be filed in the context of a writ of habeas corpus. This extends the reach of a claim under 42 U.S.C. § 1983, to include alternative methods of execution not authorized by the state, as well as, those authorized by the state.

=== Opinion of the Court ===
In her writing for the majority, Justice Kagan stated that it is through "comparative exercise" that the state does not "cruelly superadd(s)" pain onto the inmate, in violation of their Eighth Amendment rights. That the inmate has an option to choose a method of death that is not practiced by the state of imprisonment but also other states, this reduces the "burden" of the inmate. She adds that due to the "vagaries of state law”, if prisoners of different state have to file different types of claims (e.g. an inmate filing a §1983 claim in Alabama for a firing squad as their preferred choice of death and an inmate filing a habeas claim in Georgia for the same method of death), this "non-conformity" would be "strange". She wrote that the inmate claim for a differing death method is not dispute their death sentence and does not prevent or burden the state from issuing the death penalty to the inmate, the state can simply change its laws on death penalty as they have done before.

=== Dissent ===
In her dissent, Justice Barrett wrote that the claim by the prisoner would prevent the state from executing the prisoner as the state does not practice such a method of execution under their laws, therefore the claim made should be a habeas claim and not a claim under 42 U.S.C. § 1983. She rebuts the majority claim by arguing that the non-conformity is an "unremarkable consequence of federalism" and enjoinment of the death sentence is to enjoin enforcement of it, therefore a habeas claim should be filed.

== Reactions ==
Matthew Hellman, a partner of the law firm that represented the inmate, released a statement saying that the ruling provides the inmate "a pathway to seek a humane and lawful execution".

== See also ==
- Nelson v. Campbell
