= Cruz v. Arizona =

- Supreme Court of the United States

Argued November 1, 2022 Decided February 22, 2023
- Full case name: John Montenegro Cruz v. Arizona
- Docket no.: 21-846
- Citations: 598 U.S. 17 (more)
- Argument: Oral argument
- Opinion announcement: Opinion announcement

Holding
- The Arizona Supreme Court's holding that Lynch v. Arizona was not a significant change in the law is an exceptional case where a state-court judgment rests on such a novel and unforeseeable interpretation of a state-court procedural rule that the decision is not adequate to foreclose review of the federal claim.

Court membership
- Chief Justice John Roberts Associate Justices Clarence Thomas · Samuel Alito; Sonia Sotomayor · Elena Kagan; Neil Gorsuch · Brett Kavanaugh; Amy Coney Barrett · Ketanji Brown Jackson

Case opinions
- Majority: Sotomayor, joined by Roberts, Kagan, Kavanaugh, Jackson
- Dissent: Barrett, joined by Thomas, Alito, Gorsuch

Cruz v. Arizona, 598 U.S. 17 (2023), was a United States Supreme Court case related to claim preclusion in habeas corpus.

== Background ==
In 2003, John Montenegro Cruz shot and killed Tucson, Arizona police officer Patrick Hardesty. He was convicted of capital murder and sentenced to death in state court in 2005. He argued at trial and on direct appeal that under Simmons v. South Carolina, the jury should have been told that a life sentence in Arizona would not allow for parole, but the state courts rejected this claim, holding that Simmons did not apply to Arizona’s sentencing scheme.

After Cruz’s conviction became final, the Supreme Court held in Lynch v. Arizona that it was error to conclude that Simmons did not require juries be offered such instructions in the state. Cruz then sought postconviction relief under Arizona Rule of Criminal Procedure 32.1(g), but the Arizona Supreme Court denied relief in 2021.

Cruz filed a petition for a writ of certiorari, asking whether Lynch applies to cases pending on collateral review.

== Supreme Court of the United States ==
The Supreme Court granted certiorari on March 28, 2022, limited to the question of whether the judgment of the Arizona Supreme Court rested on an adequate and independent state-law ground. On February 22, 2023, the Court in a decision by Justice Sonia Sotomayor reversed the decision of the Arizona Supreme Court.

The Supreme Court generally does not review if a state court’s decision rests on a state-law ground that is independent of the federal issue and adequate to support the judgment, as explained in Lee v. Kemna (2002). However, in exceptional cases, a state procedural rule applied in an unforeseeable or unsupported manner does not constitute an adequate ground to foreclose review of a federal claim. This principle has been applied for over a century and reaffirmed in later decisions such as NAACP v. Alabama ex rel. Patterson (1958) and Walker v. Martin (2011), which emphasized that novel, arbitrary, or unsupported procedural requirements cannot be used to block review of federal constitutional rights.

The Arizona Supreme Court’s refusal to treat Lynch as a “significant change in the law” under Rule 32.1(g) was a novel and unsupported application of state procedure that ignored its effect on Arizona law, rendering the state procedural ground inadequate to bar federal review.
