= O'Dell v. Netherland =

- Supreme Court of the United States

Argued March 18, 1997 Decided June 19, 1997
- Full case name: Joseph Roger O'Dell, III, Petitioner, v. J.D. Netherland, Warden, Mecklenburg Correctional Center, et al., Respondents.
- Docket no.: 96-6867
- Citations: 521 U.S. 151 (more) 117 S. Ct. 1969; 138 L. Ed. 2d 351; 65 U.S.L.W. 4506

Case history
- Prior: Convictions and sentences upheld, O'Dell v. Commonwealth, 234 Va. 672, 364 S.E.2d 491 (1988); affirmed on rehearing, Record No. 861219 (Va., April 1, 1988); cert. denied, O'Dell v. Virginia, 488 U.S. 871 (1988); rehearing denied, 488 U.S. 977 (1988); habeas corpus denied (Va. Cir., City of Virginia Beach, November 26, 1990); petition for appeal dismissed (Va., April 1, 1991); rehearing denied (Va., June 7, 1991); cert. denied, O'Dell v. Thompson, 502 U.S. 995 (1991); habeas corpus granted in part, denied in part (E.D. Va., September 6, 1994); reversed in part, affirmed in part, O'Dell v. Netherland, 95 F.3d 1214 (4th Cir. 1996); stay granted, 519 U.S. 1049 (1996) (Rehnquist, C.J., in chambers); cert. granted in part, 519 U.S. 1050 (1996).

Holding
- Simmons v. South Carolina does not apply retroactively to cases on federal habeas corpus review.

Court membership
- Chief Justice William Rehnquist Associate Justices John P. Stevens · Sandra Day O'Connor; Antonin Scalia · Anthony Kennedy; David Souter · Clarence Thomas; Ruth Bader Ginsburg · Stephen Breyer

Case opinions
- Majority: Thomas, joined by Rehnquist, O'Connor, Scalia, Kennedy
- Dissent: Stevens, joined by Souter, Ginsburg, Breyer

Laws applied
- U.S. Const. amend. XIV

O'Dell v. Netherland, 521 U.S. 151 (1997), was a United States Supreme Court case in which the court held that the rule of Simmons v. South Carolina, that a capital defendant has the right to have their jury informed of their parole ineligibility where their future dangerousness is put at issue, does not apply retroactively to cases on federal habeas corpus review.
