= Harris v. Alabama =

- Supreme Court of the United States

Argued December 5, 1994 Decided February 22, 1995
- Full case name: Harris v. Alabama
- Docket no.: 93-7659
- Citations: 513 U.S. 504 (more)
- Argument: Oral argument

Court membership
- Chief Justice William Rehnquist Associate Justices John P. Stevens · Sandra Day O'Connor; Antonin Scalia · Anthony Kennedy; David Souter · Clarence Thomas; Ruth Bader Ginsburg · Stephen Breyer

Case opinions
- Majority: O'Connor, joined by Rehnquist, Scalia, Kennedy, Souter, Thomas, Ginsburg, Breyer
- Dissent: Stevens

Harris v. Alabama, 513 U.S. 504 (1995), was a case in which the Supreme Court of the United States held that allowing the judge to impose a death sentence and making the jury recommendation non-binding even when it calls for life imprisonment is constitutional.

== See also ==
- List of United States Supreme Court decisions on capital punishment
