= Malloy v. South Carolina =

1915 United States Supreme Court case

- Supreme Court of the United States

Argued March 5, 1915 Decided April 5, 1915
- Full case name: Malloy v. South Carolina
- Citations: 237 U.S. 180 (more)

Court membership
- Chief Justice Edward D. White Associate Justices Joseph McKenna · Oliver W. Holmes Jr. William R. Day · Charles E. Hughes; Willis Van Devanter · Joseph R. Lamar; Mahlon Pitney · James C. McReynolds

Malloy v. South Carolina, 237 U.S. 180 (1915), was a case in which the Supreme Court of the United States held that retroactively changing the execution method does not violate the Ex post facto clause.

== See also ==
- List of United States Supreme Court decisions on capital punishment
