= Maynard v. Cartwright =

Maynard v. Howell
- Supreme Court of the United States

Argued April 19, 1988 Decided June 6, 1988
- Full case name: Maynard v. Cartwright
- Citations: 486 U.S. 356 (more) 108 S. Ct. 1853; 100 L. Ed. 2d 372; 1988 U.S. LEXIS 2486

Case history
- Prior: Cartwright v. Maynard, 802 F.2d 1203 (10th Cir. 1986); on rehearing en banc, 822 F.2d 1477 (10th Cir. 1987); cert. granted, 484 U.S. 1003 (1988).

Holding
- Oklahoma's statutory characterization of aggravating circumstances as "especially heinous, atrocious, or cruel" is unconstitutionally vague under the Eighth Amendment; the proper analysis focuses on whether the challenged aggravating circumstance adequately informs the jury as to what it must find in order to impose the death penalty, or whether it leaves the jury with unchanneled discretion to make an arbitrary and capricious decision.

Court membership
- Chief Justice William Rehnquist Associate Justices William J. Brennan Jr. · Byron White; Thurgood Marshall · Harry Blackmun; John P. Stevens · Sandra Day O'Connor; Antonin Scalia · Anthony Kennedy

Case opinions
- Majority: White, joined by unanimous
- Concurrence: Brennan, joined by Marshall

Laws applied
- U.S. Const. amend. VIII

Maynard v. Cartwright, 486 U.S. 356 (1988), is a United States Supreme Court case in which a unanimous Court found that the "especially heinous, atrocious or cruel" standard for the application of the death penalty as defined by the Eighth Amendment was too vague. As such, Oklahoma's law was overturned based on Furman v. Georgia (1972).

Justice William J. Brennan Jr. announced in a concurrence, joined by Justice Thurgood Marshall, that he would adhere to his view that the death penalty is in all circumstances cruel and unusual punishment prohibited by the Eighth and Fourteenth Amendments.

== See also ==
- Capital punishment
- Eighth Amendment to the United States Constitution
- Walton v. Arizona (1990)
- List of United States Supreme Court cases, volume 486
- List of United States Supreme Court cases
- Lists of United States Supreme Court cases by volume
- List of United States Supreme Court cases by the Rehnquist Court
