= Schad v. Arizona =

- Supreme Court of the United States

Argued February 27, 1991 Decided June 21, 1991
- Full case name: Schad v. State of Arizona
- Citations: 501 U.S. 624 (more) 111 S. Ct. 2491; 115 L. Ed. 2d 555

Case history
- Prior: State v. Schad, 163 Ariz. 411, 788 P.2d 1162 (1989); cert. granted, 498 U.S. 894 (1990).

Holding
- (1) Robbery is not a lesser included offense of felony murder predicated on robbery, and so Beck v. Alabama does not require a jury instruction on robbery when a defendant is charged with felony murder. (2) Because jurors need not agree on the mode of commission of an offense, Arizona may classify both premeditated murder and felony murder as first-degree murder and require that jurors unanimously agree only that first-degree murder was committed, rather than that felony murder or premeditated murder was committed.

Court membership
- Chief Justice William Rehnquist Associate Justices Byron White · Thurgood Marshall; Harry Blackmun · John P. Stevens; Sandra Day O'Connor · Antonin Scalia; Anthony Kennedy · David Souter

Case opinions
- Majority: Souter, joined by Rehnquist, O'Connor, Kennedy (in full); Scalia (part III)
- Concurrence: Scalia
- Dissent: White, joined by Marshall, Blackmun, Stevens

Laws applied
- U.S. Const. amends. VI, XIV

Schad v. Arizona, 501 U.S. 624 (1991), is a United States Supreme Court decision that explained which charges need to be explained to the jury in trials for felony murders.

== See also ==
- List of United States Supreme Court cases, volume 501
- List of United States Supreme Court cases
- Lists of United States Supreme Court cases by volume
- List of United States Supreme Court cases by the Rehnquist Court
