= Skipper v. South Carolina =

- Supreme Court of the United States

Argued February 24, 1986 Decided April 29, 1986
- Full case name: Skipper v. South Carolina
- Citations: 476 U.S. 1 (more) 106 S. Ct. 1669; 90 L. Ed. 2d 1; 1986 U.S. LEXIS 145

Holding
- The trial court's exclusion from the sentencing hearing of the testimony of the jailers and the visitor denied petitioner his right to place before the sentencing jury all relevant evidence in mitigation of punishment.

Court membership
- Chief Justice Warren E. Burger Associate Justices William J. Brennan Jr. · Byron White; Thurgood Marshall · Harry Blackmun; Lewis F. Powell Jr. · William Rehnquist; John P. Stevens · Sandra Day O'Connor

Case opinions
- Majority: White, joined by Brennan, Marshall, Blackmun, Stevens, O'Connor
- Concurrence: Powell, joined by Burger, Rehnquist

Laws applied
- U.S. Const. amends. VIII, XIV

Skipper v. South Carolina, 476 U.S. 1 (1986), is a United States Supreme Court case in which the Court held that the rule from Lockett v. Ohio (1978) dictated that mitigating evidence not be subject to limitations based on relevance.

== Background ==
Ronald DeRay Skipper was convicted of capital murder and rape in South Carolina. During the penalty phase of his bifurcated trial, as required by Gregg v. Georgia (1976), Skipper sought to introduce as mitigating evidence that he had "adjusted well" to his pre-trial incarceration. The trial court ruled the evidence irrelevant, in keeping with controlling South Carolina caselaw, excluded the evidence. Skipper was subsequently sentenced to death.

== Holding ==
The Court held that, under Lockett, the exclusion of mitigating evidence on relevance grounds, as articulated by the South Carolina Supreme Court, violated the Eighth and Fourteenth Amendments and vacated the sentence.

== See also ==
- List of United States Supreme Court cases, volume 476
