= Kansas v. Marsh =

- Supreme Court of the United States

Argued December 7, 2005 Reargued April 25, 2006 Decided June 26, 2006
- Full case name: Kansas v. Michael Lee Marsh, II
- Docket no.: 04-1170
- Citations: 548 U.S. 163 (more) 126 S. Ct. 2516; 165 L. Ed. 2d 429

Holding
- The Eighth Amendment does not prohibit states from imposing the death penalty when aggravating and mitigating sentencing factors are in equipoise.

Court membership
- Chief Justice John Roberts Associate Justices John P. Stevens · Antonin Scalia; Anthony Kennedy · David Souter; Clarence Thomas · Ruth Bader Ginsburg; Stephen Breyer · Samuel Alito

Case opinions
- Majority: Thomas, joined by Roberts, Scalia, Kennedy, Alito
- Concurrence: Scalia
- Dissent: Stevens
- Dissent: Souter, joined by Stevens, Ginsburg, Breyer

Laws applied
- U.S. Const. amend. VIII

Kansas v. Marsh, 548 U.S. 163 (2006), is a United States Supreme Court case in which the Court held that a Kansas death penalty statute was consistent with the United States Constitution. The statute in question provided for a death sentence when the aggravating factors and mitigating factors were of equal weight.

== Background ==
Michael Lee Marsh II was convicted of capital murder for the 1996 killings of Marry Ann Pusch and her 19-month-old daughter Marry Elizabeth Pusch in Wichita, Kansas. The Kansas capital punishment statute allowed for the imposition of the death penalty if the mitigating and aggravating factors were of equal weight, so Marsh was sentenced to death.

After Marsh's sentencing, the Kansas Supreme Court in State v Kleypas, declared the law unconstitutional under the Eighth Amendment and overturned it. Ruling that "fundamental fairness requires that a 'tie goes to the defendant' when life or death is at issue".

== Supreme Court ==
=== Decision ===
By a 5–4 vote, the United States Supreme Court reversed the Kansas Supreme Court's decision and upheld the Kansas death penalty statute. Justice Souter as well as Justices Stevens, Ginsburg and Breyer dissented from the majority, with Justice Souter calling the Kansas death penalty statute "morally absurd", "a moral irrationality" and "obtuse by any moral or social measure".

Justice Scalia criticised the dissenting opinion, claiming that the dissenting justices failed to cite a case in which it is clear that an individual was executed for a crime they did not commit:

Capital cases are given especially close scrutiny at every level, which is why in most cases many years elapse before the sentence is executed. And of course capital cases receive special attention in the application of executive clemency. Indeed, one of the arguments made by the abolitionists is that the process of finally completing all the appeals and reexaminations of capital sentences is so lengthy, and thus so expensive for the state, that the game is not worth the candle. The proof of the pudding, of course, is that as far as anyone can determine (and many are looking), none of cases included in the .027% error rate for American verdicts involved a capital defendant erroneously executed.

=== Dissent ===
Justice David Souter's dissent highlighted the possibility of wrongful convictions in capital cases. He pointed to Illinois, where thirteen death-row prisoners were released between 1977 and 2000, several after evidence showed that they were innocent. The cases generally involved weak evidence connecting the prisoners to the crimes. The examples illustrated that wrongful incarceration could occur even after trials that were fair and constitutionally sound.

== Criticism ==
Justice Scalia's concurrence has been criticised for describing a criminal justice system "unfamiliar to anyone who has ever covered a murder case, read a book about one, or watched television news".

== Aftermath ==
The Supreme Court remanded the case to the Kansas Supreme Court, which ordered a new trial. At the start of the second trial, Marsh pled guilty and was sentenced to life in prison.

== See also ==
- List of United States Supreme Court decisions on capital punishment
