= Lockhart v. Fretwell =

- Supreme Court of the United States

Argued November 3, 1992 Decided January 25, 1993
- Full case name: Lockhart, Director, Arkansas Department of Corrections v. Fretwell
- Citations: 506 U.S. 364 (more) 113 S. Ct. 838; 122 L. Ed. 2d 180

Case history
- Prior: Fretwell v. Lockhart, 739 F. Supp. 1334 (E.D. Ark. 1990); affirmed in part, 946 F.2d 571 (8th Cir. 1991); cert. granted, 504 U.S. 908 (1992).

Court membership
- Chief Justice William Rehnquist Associate Justices Byron White · Harry Blackmun; John P. Stevens · Sandra Day O'Connor; Antonin Scalia · Anthony Kennedy; David Souter · Clarence Thomas

Case opinions
- Majority: Rehnquist, joined by White, O'Connor, Scalia, Kennedy, Souter, Thomas
- Concurrence: O'Connor
- Concurrence: Thomas
- Dissent: Stevens, joined by Blackmun

Lockhart v. Fretwell, 506 U.S. 364 (1993), is a decision of the United States Supreme Court which held that failure to make an objection under Collins v. Lockhart did not constitute undue prejudice required by Strickland v. Washington, because the error did not cause a fundamentally unfair trial, as opposed to merely a different outcome of the case.

== Facts ==
An Arkansas Jury convicted Fretwell of Capital Murder, and sentenced him to the death penalty. In April 1985, Fretwell entered the home of the victim, stole the victim's money, and shot the victim in the head. Subsequently, the jury was asked in the penalty phase to determine two aggravating circumstances. The first of these was whether or not Fretwell committed the homicide for the purpose of avoiding or preventing arrest. The second was whether or not Fretwell committed the homicide for pecuniary gain. The jury subsequently found only the second aggravating factor, and found no mitigating factors. Fretwell's attorney failed to object to the submission of the second of these aggravating factors to the jury, despite the ruling of the Eighth Circuit Court of Appeals in Collins v. Lockhart, which held that whether or not a defendant commits a homicide for pecuniary gain was unconstitutional under the Eighth and Fourteenth amendments to the Constitution of the United States in the setting of homicide committed in the context of a robbery.
