= Lankford v. Idaho =

- Supreme Court of the United States

Argued February 19, 1991 Decided May 20, 1991
- Full case name: Bryan Stuart Lankford v. Idaho
- Citations: 500 U.S. 110 (more)
- Argument: Oral argument

Case history
- Prior: State v. Lankford, 747 P.2d 710 (Idaho 1987)

Holding
- The sentencing process in this case violated the Due Process Clause of the Fourteenth Amendment because, at the time of the sentencing hearing, Lankford and his counsel did not have adequate notice that the judge might sentence him to death. Idaho Supreme Court reversed and remanded.

Court membership
- Chief Justice William Rehnquist Associate Justices Byron White · Thurgood Marshall; Harry Blackmun · John P. Stevens; Sandra Day O'Connor · Antonin Scalia; Anthony Kennedy · David Souter

Case opinions
- Majority: Stevens, joined by Marshall, Blackmun, O'Connor, Kennedy
- Dissent: Scalia, joined by Rehnquist, White, Souter

Lankford v. Idaho, 500 U.S. 110 (1991), was a United States Supreme Court case in which the Court held that the petitioner, Bryan Lankford, had been unconstitutionally sentenced to death in violation of the Due Process Clause of the Fourteenth Amendment. The Court held 5–4 that Lankford had not received adequate notice that he could be sentenced to death before the trial judge imposed such a sentence on him, and therefore reversed the prior ruling to the contrary by the Idaho Supreme Court.

== Background ==
Bryan Lankford, along with his brother Mark Lankford, was convicted of the double murder of Robert and Cheryl Bravence, a couple from Texas vacationing in Idaho. The murder took place in 1983, and the Lankford brothers were convicted of it the following year. At Bryan Lankford's trial, the prosecutor had explicitly told the judge that he would not seek the death penalty, and it was not discussed during the subsequent sentencing hearing. Nevertheless, the following week, the judge sentenced both Bryan and Mark Lankford to death, and the Idaho Supreme Court upheld both brothers' death sentences. Both brothers then appealed their sentences to the United States Supreme Court, which granted certiorari in Bryan's case while denying it in Mark's case.

== Opinion of the Court ==
The Supreme Court decided Lankford v. Idaho on May 20, 1991. The majority opinion was written by Justice John Paul Stevens and joined by Thurgood Marshall, Harry Blackmun, Sandra Day O'Connor, and Anthony Kennedy. It held that "[t]he sentencing process in this case violated the Due Process Clause of the Fourteenth Amendment because, at the time of the sentencing hearing, Lankford and his counsel did not have adequate notice that the judge might sentence him to death."

The dissenting opinion was written by Justice Antonin Scalia and joined by Chief Justice William Rehnquist, as well as by Byron White and David Souter. It argued that Lankford had, in fact, received constitutionally sufficient notice that he could be sentenced to death, because, among other things, Idaho state law "clearly states that 'every person guilty of murder of the first degree shall be punished by death or by imprisonment for life.'" Because Justice O'Connor was in the majority, this case marked the first one of the 1990–1991 term in which Souter and O'Connor were on opposite sides.

== Subsequent revelations about Thurgood Marshall's vote ==
After Marshall's death in January 1993, his Supreme Court papers were released to the public by the Library of Congress. Jeffrey Rosen subsequently described how those papers had revealed that Marshall had originally voted at conference to affirm the Idaho Supreme Court's decision in Lankford. This vote had been cast despite Marshall's longstanding and absolute opposition to the death penalty in all circumstances, and one of Marshall's clerks subsequently wrote a memo to him pointing out that Lankford concerned the question of whether a death sentence was constitutional. Though Chief Justice Rehnquist went on to assign the majority opinion in the case to Marshall, Marshall later wrote back to the Chief Justice, telling him that he was switching sides due to his belief in the unconstitutionality of the death penalty.

== Impact ==
After the Supreme Court's decision in Lankford v. Idaho, Bryan Lankford's sentence was commuted from death to life in prison. As of 2018, he remains incarcerated at Idaho State Correctional Center in Boise. The case also created what has become known as the "Lankford notice exception", which states that if, after an arraignment of a criminal defendant, a prosecutor indicates to the judge that they will not seek the death penalty, it is an unconstitutional violation of due process to impose the death penalty on that defendant.
