= Godfrey v. Georgia =

- Supreme Court of the United States

Argued February 20, 1980 Decided May 19, 1980
- Full case name: Robert Franklin Godfrey v. The State of Georgia
- Citations: 446 U.S. 420 (more) 100 S. Ct. 1759; 64 L. Ed. 2d 398

Holding
- The Court reversed the judgment insofar as it leaves standing the death sentences, and the case was remanded.

Court membership
- Chief Justice Warren E. Burger Associate Justices William J. Brennan Jr. · Potter Stewart; Byron White · Thurgood Marshall; Harry Blackmun · Lewis F. Powell Jr. William Rehnquist · John P. Stevens

Case opinions
- Plurality: Stewart, joined by Blackmun, Powell, Stevens
- Concurrence: Marshall, joined by Brennan
- Dissent: Burger
- Dissent: White, joined by Rehnquist

Laws applied
- U.S. Const. amends. VIII, XIV

Godfrey v. Georgia, 446 U.S. 420 (1980), was a United States Supreme Court case in which the Court held that a death sentence could not be granted for a murder when the only aggravating factor was that the murder was found to be "outrageously or wantonly vile."

The Court reversed and remanded the Georgia death penalty sentence because, under Furman v. Georgia, such a factor did not help sentencing judges or juries avoid arbitrary and capricious infliction of the death penalty.

== Background ==
Robert Franklin Godfrey was a Georgia death row inmate. He was sentenced to death for the murders of his estranged wife Mildred and her mother, Chessie Wilkerson, which he committed on September 20, 1977.

After threatening his estranged wife of 28 years, Mildred Godfrey, with a knife and tearing her clothes during a drunken argument on September 5, Mildred left their house, secured a warrant against Godfrey charging him with aggravated assault, and officially filed for divorce, after which she moved into her mother's home. Godfrey and Mildred were scheduled to attend a court hearing regarding the divorce petition on September 22. Two days prior, September 20, Mildred confirmed in a phone call with Godfrey that she would never reconcile with him. Godfrey, believing his mother-in-law was responsible for his estranged wife's rejection of his offers to reconcile, went to the home where they were staying alongside the 11-year-old daughter Godfrey and Mildred shared. Godfrey shot Mildred through a window with a shotgun, killing her instantly, and then entered the home, beat his and Mildred's daughter with the barrel of his shotgun when she attempted to run for help, and instantly killed his mother-in-law, Chessie Wilkerson, by shooting her as well.

Subsequently, Polk County courts charged Godfrey with two counts of first-degree murder and one count of aggravated assault. Despite pleading not guilty by reason of temporary insanity, Godfrey's jury convicted him of all three counts on March 9, 1978. During the sentencing phase of his trial (which took place before the same jurors), the prosecutor stated that Godfrey's case did not contain allegations of "torture" or of an "aggravated battery," after which the trial judge provided the jury with instructions regarding the standards they were to use in imposing a sentence for Godfrey. The jury imposed death sentences for both murder counts, finding that the sole aggravating circumstance for each murder was "that the offense of murder was outrageously or wantonly vile, horrible and inhuman". The trial judge, in filling out a required post-conviction report, confirmed neither murder victim was "physically harmed or tortured ... excluding the actual murdering of the two victims" during the commission of the crime.

=== Procedural history ===
In 1979, the Supreme Court of Georgia upheld Godfrey's death sentences and affirmed his convictions, rejecting Godfrey's argument that the state's death penalty legislation and requirements for imposing a death sentence were "unconstitutionally vague" and also noting that the U.S. Supreme Court had previously upheld Georgia's death penalty legislation in the 1976 ruling Gregg v. Georgia. The Supreme Court of Georgia also found that the jury did not impose Godfrey's death sentence "under the influence of passion, prejudice, or any other arbitrary factor," and concluded that the sentence was "neither excessive nor disproportionate to the penalty imposed in similar cases." Two Georgia Supreme Court members dissented.

== Opinion of the Court ==
In a 6–3 plurality, the U.S. Supreme Court decided in favor of Godfrey. Justice Potter Stewart delivered the opinion, deciding that Georgia's death penalty legislation was unconstitutionally vague and did not properly distinguish between cases that would be eligible for the death penalty and cases that would be ineligible. Additionally, the Court decided Godfrey's crimes did not meet Georgia's preexisting criteria regardless of whether or not Georgia's death penalty legislation was constitutional. Justice Thurgood Marshall and Justice William J. Brennan Jr. concurred with Stewart's opinion and added that, while death penalty sentencing should require stricter sentencing guidelines, the death penalty was inherently unconstitutional and in violation of the Eighth and Fourteenth Amendments to the United States Constitution.

Chief Justice Warren E. Burger dissented, arguing that the plurality's decision would lead to more arbitrary enforcement of the death penalty due to the law being imposed on a case-by-case basis. Justice Byron White filed a second dissenting opinion arguing that Georgia law was sufficiently strict in ensuring juries would not disproportionately impose the death penalty for crimes that did not warrant it, and White also argued that the U.S. Supreme Court should not interfere with Georgia Supreme Court decisions when the latter was "responsibly and consistently interpreting state law"; Justice William Rehnquist joined in White's dissent.

== Subsequent developments ==
The U.S. Supreme Court granted certiorari and vacated Godfrey's death sentence. In addition to Godfrey's death sentence being overturned, the U.S. Supreme Court's decision resulted in the immediate overturning of five other Georgia death row inmates' sentences—James Richard Patrick, Kenneth Hardy, Joseph Holcombe Mulligan, Keith Fair, and Kenneth Dampier—all of whom had the "outrageously or wantonly vile" aggravating circumstance to justify their death sentences. By October 1980, the Georgia Supreme Court reinstated all six inmates' death sentences, although Godfrey would still receive a re-sentencing hearing the next year.

In 1981, a second jury re-sentenced Godfrey to death for the two murders. Godfrey filed a petition for a writ of habeas corpus in 1985, and the United States District Court for the Northern District of Georgia granted Godfrey's request for habeas relief, vacating Godfrey's conviction and sentence and further deciding that to attempt to obtain a third death sentence against him would violate Godfrey's right against double jeopardy. In 1988, the United States Court of Appeals for the Eleventh Circuit affirmed the federal district court's decision. Subsequently, Godfrey's death sentence was commuted to a sentence of life imprisonment.

Godfrey died on May 31, 2005.
