= Felker v. Turpin =

- Supreme Court of the United States

Argued June 3, 1996 Decided June 28, 1996
- Full case name: Felker v. Turpin, Warden
- Citations: 518 U.S. 651 (more) 116 S. Ct. 2333; 135 L. Ed. 2d 827

Holding
- The restrictions on second or successive habeas corpus petitions enacted by the Antiterrorism and Effective Death Penalty Act of 1996 (AEDPA) do not violate the Suspension Clause and do not unconstitutionally deprive the Supreme Court of its authority to entertain original habeas petitions.

Court membership
- Chief Justice William Rehnquist Associate Justices John P. Stevens · Sandra Day O'Connor; Antonin Scalia · Anthony Kennedy; David Souter · Clarence Thomas; Ruth Bader Ginsburg · Stephen Breyer

Case opinions
- Majority: Rehnquist, joined by O'Connor, Scalia, Kennedy, Souter, Thomas, Ginsburg, Breyer, Stevens
- Concurrence: Stevens, joined by Souter, Breyer
- Concurrence: Souter, joined by Stevens, Breyer

Laws applied
- U.S. Const. art. I, § 9, cl. 2 (Suspension Clause); Antiterrorism and Effective Death Penalty Act of 1996 (AEDPA); 28 U.S.C. §§ 2241, 2244

Felker v. Turpin, 518 U.S. 651 (1996), was a decision of the United States Supreme Court about federal habeas corpus after the Antiterrorism and Effective Death Penalty Act of 1996 (AEDPA). The Court concluded that AEDPA's provisions changed the standards governing the granting of habeas corpus petitions but did not violate the Suspension Clause.

== Background ==
In 1983 the petitioner, Ellis Wayne Felker was convicted of murdering 19-year-old college student Evelyn Joy Ludlam. Ludlam met Felker at a bar, and disappeared the next day after going to Felker's house. Her body was found two weeks later in a creek. Felker was convicted on the following evidence:

1. He was the last person seen with Ludlam before she disappeared.
2. Hairs found on the victims clothes were similar to Felker's.
3. Fibers on her coat showed she had been inside Felker's house.
4. The attack was similar to a sexual assault that Felker had been convicted of in 1976.

Felker acknowledged that he had been with the victim shortly before she disappeared, but he denied killing her and claimed that the last time he saw her was when she left his shop. A jury convicted him and he was sentenced to death. The Georgia Supreme Court affirmed the conviction and sentence, and subsequent state and federal collateral challenges were unsuccessful.

AEDPA was signed into law on April 24, 1994 and severely limited second or successive federal habeas petitions permitting them only in narrow circumstances involving new retroactive constitutional rules or newly discovered evidence of innocence, and requiring a certificate of appealability from a court of appeals.

He spent thirteen years on death row, and shortly before his scheduled execution his lawyers sought DNA testing of physical evidence—including hairs found on the victim's body—but the Eleventh Circuit Court of Appeals denied the request under AEDPA’s gatekeeping provisions. Even for cases like Felker's where the science to test DNA was not available at the time of trial the physical evidence itself was often not "newly discovered evidence" under AEDPA rules.

The Supreme Court granted certiorari and a stay of execution on May 3 to consider the constitutionality and scope of AEDPA’s restrictions on federal habeas review.

== Supreme Court ==
The unanimous decision delivered by Chief Justice William Rehnquist contained three principal holdings:

1. AEDPA's restrictions on reviewing denials of authorization for successive petitions did not eliminate the Supreme Court's original habeas jurisdiction.
2. AEDPA's gatekeeping provisions did not violate the Suspension Clause.
3. The continued availability of original habeas review allowed the Court to avoid deciding whether AEDPA violated U.S. Const. art. III, § 2.

The Court further concluded that while AEDPA's gatekeeping provisions apply only to petitions filed in district courts, the statute nevertheless informs the standards governing the Court's consideration of original habeas petitions: "Whether or not we are bound by these restrictions, they certainly inform our consideration of original habeas petitions."

Federal courts had been authorized since 1867 to review state court judgments for "violation[s] of the constitution, or of any treaty or law of the United States". Then, in Brown v. Allen (1953) the Supreme Court held, based on the statutory interpretation of the 1867 statute, that state court judgments on federal constitutional questions were not res judicata in federal habeas corpus proceedings. AEDPA's gatekeeping requirements codified judicial rules that developed in the decades after Brown to limit multiple or abusive petitions. Chief Justice Rehnquist said that AEDPA's restrictions on successive petitions were "a modified res judicata rule" that fell "well within the compass of [the] evolutionary process" explained in McCleskey v. Zant (1991), meaning courts would no longer review federal questions de novo.

== Significance ==
Felker v .Turpin was quoted by Justice John Paul Stevens in INS v. St. Cyr for the principle that "at the absolute minimum, the Suspension Clause protects the writ 'as it existed in 1789'". This view guided the Guantanamo Bay detention camp decisions, Rasul v. Bush (2004) and Boumediene v. Bush (2008), which upheld the requirement that detainees in U.S. custody are, at minimum, given an opportunity to show evidence that they have been wrongly detained.

== Aftermath ==
Felker was executed by electrocution in Georgia on November 15, 1996. As part of the posthumous exoneration movement The Boston Globe successfully advocated for posthumous DNA testing based on the Georgia Open Records Act, but the results were inconclusive.
