= Amadeo v. Zant =

- Supreme Court of the United States

Decided May 31, 1988
- Full case name: Amadeo v. Zant
- Citations: 486 U.S. 214 (more)

Holding
- A convicted person may use habeas corpus to challenge their conviction if they later learn that the prosecution racially discriminated in jury selection.

Court membership
- Chief Justice William Rehnquist Associate Justices William J. Brennan Jr. · Byron White; Thurgood Marshall · Harry Blackmun; John P. Stevens · Sandra Day O'Connor; Antonin Scalia · Anthony Kennedy

Case opinion
- Majority: Marshall, joined by unanimous

Amadeo v. Zant, 486 U.S. 214 (1988), was a United States Supreme Court case in which the Court held that a convicted person may use habeas corpus to challenge their conviction if they later learn that the prosecution racially discriminated in jury selection.

== See also ==
- Batson v. Kentucky
