= Adams v. Texas =

- Supreme Court of the United States

Argued March 24, 1980 Decided June 25, 1980
- Full case name: Randall Dale Adams v. State of Texas
- Citations: 448 U.S. 38 (more) 100 S. Ct. 2521; 65 L. Ed. 2d 581

Case history
- Prior: Certiorari to the Court of Criminal Appeals of Texas
- Subsequent: 577 S.W.2d 717, reversed.

Holding
- A Texas requirement that jurors swear an oath that the mandatory imposition of a death sentence would not interfere with their consideration of factual matters such as guilt or innocence during a trial is unconstitutional.

Court membership
- Chief Justice Warren E. Burger Associate Justices William J. Brennan Jr. · Potter Stewart; Byron White · Thurgood Marshall; Harry Blackmun · Lewis F. Powell Jr. William Rehnquist · John P. Stevens

Case opinions
- Majority: White, joined by Brennan, Stewart, Blackmun, Powell, Stevens
- Concurrence: Burger (in the judgment)
- Concurrence: Brennan
- Concurrence: Marshall
- Dissent: Rehnquist

Adams v. Texas, 448 U.S. 38 (1980), was a United States Supreme Court case in which the Court held on an 8–1 vote that, consistent with its prior opinion in Witherspoon v. Illinois, a Texas requirement that jurors swear an oath that the mandatory imposition of a death sentence would not interfere with their consideration of factual matters such as guilt or innocence during a trial was unconstitutional.

The surrounding factual issues (involving defendant Randall Dale Adams) were the subject of a partially autobiographical book of the same name, and were featured in the 1988 movie The Thin Blue Line.
