= Martel v. Clair =

- Supreme Court of the United States

Decided March 5, 2012
- Full case name: Martel v. Clair
- Citations: 565 U.S. 648 (more)

Holding
- When evaluating motions to substitute counsel in capital cases, courts should employ the same "interests of justice" standard that applies in non-capital cases.

Court membership
- Chief Justice John Roberts Associate Justices Antonin Scalia · Anthony Kennedy; Clarence Thomas · Ruth Bader Ginsburg; Stephen Breyer · Samuel Alito; Sonia Sotomayor · Elena Kagan

Case opinion
- Majority: Kagan, joined by unanimous

Martel v. Clair, 565 U.S. 648 (2012), was a United States Supreme Court case in which the court held that when evaluating motions to substitute counsel in capital cases, courts should employ the same "interests of justice" standard that applies in non-capital cases.
