= Morgan v. Illinois =

- Supreme Court of the United States

Argued January 21, 1992 Decided June 15, 1992
- Full case name: Derrick Morgan v. State of Illinois
- Citations: 504 U.S. 719 (more) 112 S. Ct. 2222; 119 L. Ed. 2d 492; 1992 U.S. LEXIS 3548; 60 U.S.L.W. 4541; 92 Cal. Daily Op. Service 5037; 92 Daily Journal DAR 7962; 6 Fla. L. Weekly Fed. S 421

Case history
- Prior: Certiorari to the Supreme Court of Illinois

Holding
- A defendant facing the death penalty may challenge for cause a prospective juror who would automatically vote to impose the death penalty in every case.

Court membership
- Chief Justice William Rehnquist Associate Justices Byron White · Harry Blackmun; John P. Stevens · Sandra Day O'Connor; Antonin Scalia · Anthony Kennedy; David Souter · Clarence Thomas

Case opinions
- Majority: White, joined by Blackmun, Stevens, O'Connor, Kennedy, Souter
- Dissent: Scalia, joined by Rehnquist, Thomas

Laws applied
- U.S. Const. amend. VI, Due Process Clause

Morgan v. Illinois, 504 U.S. 719 (1992), is a case decided by the United States Supreme Court. The case established the right of defendants to challenge for cause any juror that would automatically impose the death penalty in all capital cases.

== Background ==
In an elaboration of the Witherspoon v. Illinois (1968) doctrine, the Rehnquist Court considered challenges to the selection of jurors who would automatically vote to impose the death penalty on a defendant convicted of a capital offense. In a 6–3 decision, Justice White wrote for the majority that a defendant facing the death penalty may challenge for cause a prospective juror who would automatically vote to impose the death penalty in every case. Just as a juror who is unalterably opposed to the imposition of the death penalty must be excluded because he or she cannot conscientiously fulfill the oath to follow the law and the instructions to the jury pursuant thereto, so should one who would automatically vote to impose the death penalty be excluded for the same reason. Such a juror, he emphasized, would lack the qualities of impartiality and indifference required by due process. Furthermore, Justice White noted, jurors who would automatically vote to impose the death penalty would not "in good faith ... consider evidence of aggravating and mitigating circumstances" as may be required by law and included in jury instructions.

== See also ==
- List of United States Supreme Court cases, volume 504
- List of United States Supreme Court cases
- Lists of United States Supreme Court cases by volume
- List of United States Supreme Court cases by the Rehnquist Court
