= Andrew v. White =

- Supreme Court of the United States

Decided January 21, 2025
- Full case name: Brenda Evers Andrew v. Tamika White, Warden
- Docket no.: 23-6573
- Citations: 604 U.S. 86 (more)
- Decision: Opinion

Holding
- At the time of the decision of the Oklahoma Court of Criminal Appeals, clearly established federal law provided that the erroneous admission of unduly prejudicial evidence could render a criminal trial fundamentally unfair in violation of due process; the judgment below is vacated and the case is remanded for further proceedings.

Court membership
- Chief Justice John Roberts Associate Justices Clarence Thomas · Samuel Alito; Sonia Sotomayor · Elena Kagan; Neil Gorsuch · Brett Kavanaugh; Amy Coney Barrett · Ketanji Brown Jackson

Case opinions
- Per curiam
- Concurrence: Alito
- Dissent: Thomas, joined by Gorsuch

Andrew v. White, 604 U.S. 86 (2025), was a United States Supreme Court case in which the court vacated and remanded the decision of the United States Court of Appeals for the Tenth Circuit, holding that, as established in Payne v. Tennessee, the Due Process Clause forbids the introduction of evidence so unduly prejudicial as to render a criminal trial fundamentally unfair.

== Background ==
An Oklahoma jury convicted Brenda Andrew of murdering her husband and sentenced her to death. At trial, the State had introduced substantial evidence "about Andrew’s sex life and about her failings as a mother and wife," which the State later admitted to be irrelevant. Andrew argued in federal court that that evidence was so prejudicial that it was a violation of the Due Process Clause. A federal district court denied her habeas corpus petition and the United States Court of Appeals for the Tenth Circuit affirmed that decision, reasoning that Payne v. Tennessee had made a "pronouncement" but not a holding of “clearly established federal law governing her claim.”

== Opinion of the Court ==
In a per curiam decision, the Supreme Court held that the legal argument relied upon by Andrew was "indispensable to the decision in Payne." Therefore, it was a holding of the Supreme Court and the petitioner had "properly identified clearly established federal law" that must be followed when ruling on her habeas petition.

== Dissent ==
Justices Thomas and Gorsuch dissented. They reasoned that the petitioner's legal argument was based on "a one-sentence aside" in Payne and that the majority opinion "redefines 'clearly established' law to include debatable interpretations of [Supreme Court] precedent."

== Later developments ==
On remand, the Tenth Circuit reaffirmed the conviction. The Court found the remaining evidence against Andrews, such as her $800,000 life insurance policy on the victim, a faked gunshot injury to disguise the murder as a robbery, and immediately fleeing with her children to Mexico before the funeral, was so overwhelming they could not find that the jury rendered its verdict because of the improper evidence about her sex life.

== See also ==
- Murder of Rob Andrew
- Capital punishment in Oklahoma
- List of death row inmates in the United States § Oklahoma
