= Calderon v. Thompson =

- Supreme Court of the United States

Decided April 29, 1998
- Full case name: Arthur Calderon, Warden v. Thomas Thompson
- Citations: 523 U.S. 538 (more) 118 S. Ct. 1489; 140 L. Ed. 2d 728

Case history
- Prior: Ninth Circuit recalled its mandate and granted habeas relief

Holding
- A court of appeals may reconsider a final judgment denying habeas relief by recalling its mandate only in extraordinary circumstances to avoid a miscarriage of justice upon a showing of actual innocence.

Court membership
- Chief Justice William Rehnquist Associate Justices John P. Stevens · Sandra Day O'Connor; Antonin Scalia · Anthony Kennedy; David Souter · Clarence Thomas; Ruth Bader Ginsburg · Stephen Breyer

Case opinions
- Majority: Kennedy, joined by Rehnquist, O’Connor, Scalia, Thomas
- Dissent: Souter, joined by Stevens, Ginsburg, Breyer

Laws applied
- Antiterrorism and Effective Death Penalty Act of 1996 (AEDPA); 28 U.S.C. § 2244

Caderon v. Thompson, 523 U.S. 538 (1998), was a United States Supreme Court case in which the court held that a federal court of appeals has an inherent power to recall its mandate, (Note: The formal notice of decision from an appellate court.) but in habeas corpus cases that power may be exercised only in extraordinary circumstances, particularly in light of the Antiterrorism and Effective Death Penalty Act's emphasis on the finality of criminal judgments. Under Calderon v. Thompson, an appeals court may recall its mandate only upon "clear and convincing evidence" of innocence—a standard that has been described as "onerous."

== Background ==
Thomas Martin Thompson was convicted in California state court of murder and the rape special circumstance that made the crime a capital offense. The victim Ginger Fleischli was found dead after staying the night at an apartment Thomson shared with David Leitch. Both men were indicted. Although suspicions initially focused on Leitch, two jailhouse informants testified at Thompson's trial that Fleischli was already dead when Leitch returned to the apartment. The prosecutor said this testimony was "dispositive". Thompson was convicted and sentenced to death. However, at Leitch's trial, the same prosecutor argued that Leitch was the murderer based on testimony from witnesses who had testified in Thompson's defense, but did not enter into evidence the testimony that had been dispostive at Thompson's trial.

The Supreme Court of California affirmed the conviction and sentence on direct appeal, and the Supreme Court denied certiorari. After unsuccessfully pursuing state post-conviction relief, Thompson filed a federal petition for a writ of habeas corpus. In a lengthy opinion, Judge Richard Arthur Gadbois Jr. granted partial relief for Thompson's ineffective assistance of counsel claim, vacating the rape conviction and the accompanying special circumstance, and thereby invalidating the death sentence while leaving the murder conviction intact.

The State appealed, and a three-judge panel of the United States Court of Appeals for the Ninth Circuit reversed the district court, reinstating the rape conviction, the special circumstance, and the death sentence. The Supreme Court denied certiorari, and the Ninth Circuit issued its mandate, rendering its judgment final. Two days before the scheduled execution, however, the Ninth Circuit voted to rehear the case en banc, recalled its mandate, vacated the panel opinion, and reinstated habeas relief. Several judges dissented, contending that the court had improperly evaded AEDPA's limits on successive habeas review. California sought review in the Supreme Court, which granted certiorari.

Seven former California prosecutors experienced in death penalty trials, including the drafter of California's death penalty statute, filed an amicus brief stating that "this is a case where it appears that our adversarial system has not produced a fair and reliable result." They said the prosecutor's use of contradictory informant testimony demonstrated "how easy it is to manipulate facts when the prosecutor's goal is to win at all costs."

== Supreme Court ==
In a 5–4 decision by Justice Anthony Kennedy the Supreme Court held that recalling a mandate is a power of last resort reserved for extraordinary situations, and that the Ninth Circuit's reliance on internal administrative oversights did not justify reopening a final judgment shortly before Thompson's execution. Justice Kennedy emphasized the state's interest in the finality of criminal judgments and identified four public-policy reasons for finality: deterrence, retribution, quality of judging and federalism.

The Court held that a federal court of appeals abuses its discretion when it recalls its mandate in a habeas case unless it does so to prevent a fundamental miscarriage of justice, a rare occurrence in which revisiting a final judgment is justified, as explained in Sawyer v. Whitley, Schlup v. Delo, and Harris v. Reed:

The miscarriage of justice standard is altogether consistent ... with AEDPA's central concern that the merits of concluded criminal proceedings not be revisited in the absence of a strong showing of actual innocence.

Thompson's evidence did not satisfy the miscarriage-of-justice standard. Although the Ninth Circuit's recall of the mandate did not formally violate AEDPA's gatekeeping provisions because it reconsidered its own judgment on Thompson's original habeas petition rather than entertaining a successive application, the Supreme Court held that courts must exercise their inherent discretion consistently with AEDPA's goals, including finality. The Court therefore concluded that the Ninth Circuit had abused its discretion by recalling its mandate.

== Commentary and analysis ==
Criminologist Cary Federman criticized the majority for emphasizing the state's interest in finality, describing the Court's opinion as "devoid of historical references to the writ's contributions to individual liberty".

Ninth Circuit judge Stephen Reinhardt wrote that "Thompson’s trial fell far short of minimal constitutional standards in every important respect". He said a recurring theme of the Rehnquist Court had been "elevating procedural rules over substantive values" by expanding "nonconstitutional doctrines such as ... procedural default, nonretroactivity, independent state grounds, and abuse of the writ", effectively rendering the protections of habeas corpus "virtually unenforceable" by "shutting the doors of the courthouse to ordinary people".

Bidish Sarma wrote that finality "serves to entrench outcomes...even where substantial constitutional questions are raised." Contending that "finality has ceased to be a prudential consideration," he maintained that developments such as plea bargaining and other structural and institutional changes have undermined the public-policy justifications cited by the Court.

Douglas E. Beloof said the Supreme Court decision in Calderon "correctly opined that victims share an interest in punishment".

== Subsequent developments ==
The Calderon decision confirmed that the "fundamental miscarriage of justice" exception for procedural default survived AEDPA. Later, in McQuiggin v. Perkins (2013), Justice Ruth Bader Ginsburg wrote for the Supreme Court in holding that the exception also applied to AEDPA's statute of limitations.

Thompson was executed on July 14, 1998.

== See also ==
- Coram nobis
