= Ryan v. Valencia Gonzales =

- Supreme Court of the United States

Argued October 9, 2012 Decided January 8, 2013
- Full case name: Charles L. Ryan, Director, Arizona Department of Corrections, Petitioner v. Ernest Valencia Gonzales; Terry Tibbals v. Sean Carter
- Docket nos.: 10-930; 11-218
- Citations: 568 U.S. 57 (more) 133 S. Ct. 696; 184 L. Ed. 2d 528; 2013 U.S. LEXIS 598; 81 U.S.L.W. 4025
- Opinion announcement: Opinion announcement

Case history
- Prior: Gonzales v. United States Dist. Court for Dist. of Ariz., 623 F.3d 1242 (9th Cir. 2010); cert. granted, 565 U.S. 1259 (2012); Carter v. Bradshaw, 644 F.3d 329 (6th Cir. 2011); cert. granted, 565 U.S. 1259 (2012).

Holding
- Petitioners need not be competent during federal habeas corpus proceedings.

Court membership
- Chief Justice John Roberts Associate Justices Antonin Scalia · Anthony Kennedy; Clarence Thomas · Ruth Bader Ginsburg; Stephen Breyer · Samuel Alito; Sonia Sotomayor · Elena Kagan

Case opinion
- Majority: Thomas, joined by unanimous

Laws applied
- §3599 and §4241 United States Code, U.S. Const. amend. VI

Ryan v. Valencia Gonzales, 568 U.S. 57 (2013), was a case in which the Supreme Court of the United States held that a defendant on death row did not need to be held competent during federal habeas corpus proceedings.

== Background ==
Ernest Valencia Gonzales was convicted in Arizona of felony murder, armed robbery, aggravated assault, first-degree burglary and theft. Gonzales was sentenced to death for the stabbing of Darrel Wagner in front of his seven-year-old son.

=== District court proceedings ===
After exhausting appeals in Arizona, Gonzales filed for a writ of habeas corpus in District Court on November 15, 1999. While the petition was pending before the court, the appointed counsel for Gonzales filed the stay proceedings arguing that Gonzales was incapable or communicating rationally or assisting with proceedings. This argument was made under existing precedent with the Ninth Circuit (Rohan v. Wood). In Rohan the Appellate Court held that habeas proceedings could not "be faithfully enforced unless courts ensure that a petitioner is competent". Rohan continues that if the proceedings pending would benefit from the petitioner's competency then proceedings cannot continue as this would deny the right to assistance of counsel. When analyzing Rohan the District Court denied the stay, arguing that the issues before the court was a matter of law and would not benefit from Gonzales' input. Determining also that because the issue was a matter of law that the court did not need to determine whether or not Gonzales was competent. Gonzales then filed an emergency appeal for a writ of mandamus with the Ninth Circuit.

=== Appellate proceedings ===
While Gonzales' petition was before the court, the Ninth Circuit issued an opinion in Nash v. Ryan which held that habeas petitioner have a right to competence on appeal, even when the appeals only deal with matters of law. Applying Nash and Rohan the court granted the stay under Section 3599. The State of Arizona appealed to the Supreme Court which granted certiorari.

== Opinion of the Court ==
The Court unanimously reversed the Ninth Circuit with Justice Thomas writing for the Court. The Court found that neither a statutory or a constitutional right exists to a petitioners competence in federal habeas corpus proceedings. Simply put because communication between counsel and defendant is unnecessary in these proceedings the district court cannot stay them. The district court should only stay proceedings if the defendant had a substantial likelihood of regaining competence, otherwise the stay of proceedings would unduly burn the justice system.
