= Beecher v. Alabama =

- Supreme Court of the United States

Decided October 23, 1967
- Full case name: Beecher v. Alabama
- Citations: 389 U.S. 35 (more)

Holding
- Eliciting a confession from a suspect while he was under the influence of morphine and recovering from a gunshot wound violated the Due Process Clause.

Court membership
- Chief Justice Earl Warren Associate Justices Hugo Black · William O. Douglas; John M. Harlan II · William J. Brennan Jr. Potter Stewart · Byron White; Abe Fortas · Thurgood Marshall

Case opinions
- Per curiam
- Concurrence: Black
- Concurrence: Brennan, joined by Warren, Douglas

Beecher v. Alabama, 389 U.S. 35 (1967), was a United States Supreme Court case in which the Court held that eliciting a confession from a suspect while he was under the influence of morphine and recovering from a gunshot wound violated the Due Process Clause.

== Description ==
Although the decision was unanimous and unsigned, the four concurring justices disagreed with describing this as a violation of the Due Process Clause. The four would have described it as a violation of the Fifth Amendment's self-incrimination protections, which had recently been incorporated against the states in Malloy v. Hogan.
