= Irvin v. Dowd =

- Supreme Court of the United States

Argued January 15, 1959 Decided May 4, 1959
- Full case name: Leslie Irvin, Petitioner, v. Alfred F. Dowd, Warden of the Indiana State Prison
- Citations: 359 U.S. 394 (more) 79 S. Ct. 825; 3 L. Ed. 2d 900

Case history
- Prior: Certiorari to the United States Court of Appeals for the Seventh Circuit

Holding
- The doctrine of exhaustion of state remedies does not bar resort to federal habeas corpus if the petitioner has obtained a decision on his constitutional claims from the highest court of a State, even though that court could have based its decision on another ground.

Court membership
- Chief Justice Earl Warren Associate Justices Hugo Black · Felix Frankfurter; William O. Douglas · Tom C. Clark; John M. Harlan II · William J. Brennan Jr. Charles E. Whittaker · Potter Stewart

Case opinions
- Majority: Brennan, joined by Warren, Black, Douglas, Stewart
- Concurrence: Stewart
- Dissent: Frankfurter
- Dissent: Harlan, joined by Frankfurter, Clark, Whittaker

Laws applied
- 28 U.S.C. § 2254

Irvin v. Dowd, 359 U.S. 394 (1959), was a United States Supreme Court case. It involved the denial of appeal of an escaped convict, Leslie Irvin. The convict sought a federal writ of habeas corpus.

Irvin v. Dowd was one of the first of many cases to underscore the "swing vote" role played by Justice Potter Stewart, who recently had come to the Supreme Court and was caught between the two warring camps of justices: the liberal camp of Justices Earl Warren and William Brennan and the conservative camp headed by Justice Felix Frankfurter.

== Factual background ==
The Irvin case centered on a series of murders in Evansville, Indiana, from 1954 to early 1955. In April 1955, local police arrested Leslie Irvin, announcing he had confessed to the crimes. Irvin's lawyers sought a change of venue for the case to avoid local biases, but they lost; a third of the jury was seated despite statements showing they had prejudged the defendant to be guilty. Irvin was sentenced to death in January 1956; he soon escaped from jail, leaving a note maintaining his innocence and alleging police misconduct and public prejudging of his case, as well as asking his lawyer to appeal. Irvin was soon recaptured, and the Indiana Supreme Court would reject his motions for appeals.

Irvin's lawyer came to the Supreme Court asking for a writ of habeas corpus.

== Legal issues ==
The case came to the Supreme Court to decide the question of whether Irvin's escaping from custody forfeited his right to appeal. Beyond that, the justices on the court prone to judicial restraint (Frankfurter, Harlan, Clark, and Whittaker) were usually not supportive of the idea of a federal court issuing a writ of habeas corpus in a state prosecution case. Brennan and Warren were concerned with the jurors who were allowed to sit on the case despite having prejudged the outcome.

Justice Stewart at first felt that court precedent, especially the case of Brown v. Allen, precluded the Supreme Court from getting involved in the state prosecution. Brennan managed to distinguish the Brown case and convinced Stewart to vote with him, bringing about a 5-4 majority for the liberals. Brennan wrote an opinion forcing the state of Indiana to consider Irvin's appeal on the basis of the jury issue; he did not reach the matter of Irvin's escape.

== Outcome ==
Justice Brennan wrote an opinion holding that Irvin's exhaustion of state remedies did not bar a federal court's granting habeas corpus. Stewart issued a one-line concurrence distinguishing the case from Brown v. Allen.

The four judges in the minority, Frankfurter's bloc, saw the case as an example of the Court overreaching. Frankfurter resented the interposition of federal court review over state criminal actions.

== Aftermath ==
Though Justice Brennan had begun his Supreme Court career voting with Justice Frankfurter about half the time, the Irvin case marked the end of a meaningful relationship between the two justices. Frankfurter convinced a distinguished Harvard Law professor, Henry M. Hart, Jr., to focus on the case in the law school's Harvard Law Review as a means of character-assassinating Justice Brennan.

Despite ideological divides, when the case came back to the Supreme Court nearly two years later, the Court managed to write a unanimous opinion again remanding the case to state court, due to the original trial depriving Irvin of Fourteenth Amendment due process. Justice Clark's majority opinion underscored the need for impartiality in the jury: "In essence, the right to jury trial guarantees to the criminally accused a fair trial by a panel of impartial, 'indifferent' jurors."

Justice Frankfurter wrote a concurrence on the media and its coverage's way of preventing jurors from delivering impartial verdicts.
