= Caldwell v. Mississippi =

- Supreme Court of the United States

Argued February 25, 1985 Decided June 11, 1985
- Full case name: Bobby Caldwell v. Mississippi
- Citations: 472 U.S. 320 (more) 105 S.Ct. 2633, 86 L.Ed.2d 231
- Argument: Oral argument

Case history
- Prior: Caldwell v. State, 443 So. 2d 806 (Miss. 1983), certiorari granted, 469 U.S. 879 (1984)

Holding
- A prosecutor in a capital case must never tell the jury that jurors are not deciding whether the defendant will die.

Court membership
- Chief Justice Warren E. Burger Associate Justices William J. Brennan Jr. · Byron White; Thurgood Marshall · Harry Blackmun; Lewis F. Powell Jr. · William Rehnquist; John P. Stevens · Sandra Day O'Connor

Case opinions
- Majority: Marshall (except as to Part IV-A), joined by Brennan, Blackmun, Stevens, O'Connor
- Plurality: Marshall (Part IV-A), joined by Brennan, Blackmun, Stevens
- Concurrence: O'Connor (in part and in judgment)
- Dissent: Rehnquist, joined by Burger, White
- Powell took no part in the consideration or decision of the case.

Caldwell v. Mississippi, 472 U.S. 320 (1985), was a United States Supreme Court case in which the court held that a prosecutor in a capital case must never tell the jury that jurors are not deciding whether the defendant will die. To do so violates the Eighth Amendment. The Court vacated the death sentence of the petitioner, Bobby Caldwell.

== Background ==
In a bifurcated proceeding conducted pursuant to Mississippi's capital punishment statute, Bobby Caldwell was convicted of murder and sentenced to death. The defendant's lawyers, in their closing argument at the sentencing stage, referred to petitioner's youth, family background, and poverty, as well as to general character evidence. They asked the jury to show mercy, emphasizing that the jury should confront the gravity and responsibility of calling for another's death. In response, the prosecutor urged the jury not to view itself as finally determining whether petitioner would die, because a death sentence would be reviewed for correctness by the Mississippi Supreme Court. That court unanimously affirmed the conviction but affirmed the death sentence by an equally divided court. Relying on California v. Ramos, the Mississippi Supreme Court rejected the contention that the prosecutor's comments violated the Eighth Amendment.

== Opinion of the court ==
The Supreme Court reversed. The opinion of the Court was authored by Justice Thurgood Marshall, and was joined in full by Justices William J. Brennan Jr., Harry Blackmun, and John Paul Stevens. Justice Sandra Day O'Connor, whose vote was necessary for Marshall's opinion to have support from a majority of justices, joined all of his opinion except for Part IV-A.
