= Zant v. Stephens =

- Supreme Court of the United States

Decided June 22, 1983
- Full case name: Zant v. Stephens
- Citations: 462 U.S. 862 (more)

Holding
- Aggravating circumstances in the death penalty context must meaningfully narrow the number of people eligible for the death penalty. As long as a defendant does have an aggravating circumstance, it does not matter if the one actually cited to justify the death penalty in their case is set aside.

Court membership
- Chief Justice Warren E. Burger Associate Justices William J. Brennan Jr. · Byron White; Thurgood Marshall · Harry Blackmun; Lewis F. Powell Jr. · William Rehnquist; John P. Stevens · Sandra Day O'Connor

Case opinions
- Majority: Stevens
- Concurrence: Rehnquist (in judgment)
- Concur/dissent: White
- Dissent: Marshall, joined by Brennan

Zant v. Stephens, 462 U.S. 862 (1983), was a United States Supreme Court case in which the Court held that aggravating circumstances in the death penalty context must meaningfully narrow the number of people eligible for the death penalty. As long as a defendant does have an aggravating circumstance, it does not matter if the one actually cited to justify the death penalty in their case is set aside.
