= Pulley v. Harris =

- Supreme Court of the United States

Argued November 7, 1983 Decided January 23, 1984
- Full case name: Pulley v. Harris
- Citations: 465 U.S. 37 (more) 104 S. Ct. 871; 79 L. Ed. 2d 29; 1984 U.S. LEXIS 3

Case history
- Prior: vacating death sentence, 692 F.2d 1189, (9th Cir. 1982).

Holding
- The Eighth Amendment does not require, as an invariable rule in every case, that a state appellate court, before it affirms a death sentence, compare the sentence in the case before it with the penalties imposed in similar cases if requested to do so by the prisoner.

Court membership
- Chief Justice Warren E. Burger Associate Justices William J. Brennan Jr. · Byron White; Thurgood Marshall · Harry Blackmun; Lewis F. Powell Jr. · William Rehnquist; John P. Stevens · Sandra Day O'Connor

Case opinions
- Majority: White, joined by Burger, Blackmun, Powell, Rehnquist, O'Connor; Stevens (except Part III)
- Concurrence: Stevens
- Dissent: Brennan, joined by Marshall

Laws applied
- U.S. Const. amend. VIII

Pulley v. Harris, 465 U.S. 37 (1984), is a United States Supreme Court case in which the Court held that the Eighth Amendment to the United States Constitution does not require, as an invariable rule in every case, that a state appellate court, before it affirms a death sentence, proportionally compare the sentence in the case before it with the penalties imposed in similar cases if requested to do so by the prisoner.

The prisoner in the case, Robert Alton Harris, was ultimately executed in April 1992, after the U.S. Supreme Court reversed the Ninth Circuit several more times in the matter, including after Harris had been strapped into the gas chamber.

== See also ==
- List of United States Supreme Court cases, volume 465
