= Arave v. Creech =

- Supreme Court of the United States

Decided March 30, 1993
- Full case name: Arave v. Creech
- Citations: 507 U.S. 463 (more)

Holding
- When a state uses a consistent narrowing definition for a broad term like "utter disregard," the broad term can function as a valid aggravating circumstance under the Fourteenth Amendment.

Court membership
- Chief Justice William Rehnquist Associate Justices Byron White · Harry Blackmun; John P. Stevens · Sandra Day O'Connor; Antonin Scalia · Anthony Kennedy; David Souter · Clarence Thomas

Case opinions
- Majority: O'Connor, joined by Rehnquist, White, Scalia, Kennedy, Souter, Thomas
- Dissent: Blackmun, joined by Stevens

Laws applied
- U.S. Const. amend. XIV

Arave v. Creech, 507 U.S. 463 (1993), was a United States Supreme Court case in which the Court held that, when a state uses a consistent narrowing definition for a broad term like "utter disregard," the broad term can function as a valid aggravating circumstance under the Fourteenth Amendment.
