= Beck v. Alabama =

- Supreme Court of the United States

Argued February 20, 1980 Decided June 20, 1980
- Full case name: Beck v. Alabama
- Citations: 447 U.S. 625 (more) 100 S. Ct. 2382; 65 L. Ed. 2d 392; 1980 U.S. LEXIS 134

Holding
- The death sentence may not constitutionally be imposed after a jury verdict of guilt of a capital offense where the jury was not permitted to consider a verdict of guilt of a lesser included offense.

Court membership
- Chief Justice Warren E. Burger Associate Justices William J. Brennan Jr. · Potter Stewart; Byron White · Thurgood Marshall; Harry Blackmun · Lewis F. Powell Jr. William Rehnquist · John P. Stevens

Case opinions
- Majority: Stevens, joined by Burger, Brennan, Stewart, Blackmun, and Powell
- Concurrence: Brennan
- Concurrence: Marshall
- Dissent: Rehnquist, joined by White

Laws applied
- Due Process

Beck v. Alabama, 447 U.S. 625 (1980), was a United States Supreme Court case in which the Court held that a jury must be allowed to consider lesser included offenses, not just capital offense or acquittal.

== Background ==
Gilbert Franklin Beck was participating in a robbery when his accomplice intentionally killed someone. Beck was tried for capital murder. Under the Code of Alabama, Section 13-11-2 (1975), the requisite intent to kill could not be supplied by the felony murder doctrine. Felony murder was thus a lesser-included offense of the capital crime of robbery with an intentional killing. Under the statute, the judge was specifically prohibited from giving the jury the option of convicting for the lesser-included offense. This prohibition was unique to Alabama. Absent the statutory ban on such an instruction, Beck's testimony would have entitled him to an instruction on felony murder.

== Lower Courts ==
In the lower courts, Beck attacked the ban on the grounds that the Alabama statute was the same as the mandatory death penalty statutes that the Court had been striking down in recent holdings.

== Decision of the Supreme Court ==
Though the lower courts disagreed, the Supreme Court held that the death sentence may not constitutionally be imposed after a jury verdict of guilt of a capital offense where the jury was not permitted to consider a verdict of guilt of a lesser included offense. As a result, the convictions of eleven men on death row were overturned, including Beck's.

== Later developments ==
In Bobby v. Mitts, the Supreme Court held that Beck does not apply to the penalty phase of a jury trial because Beck is targeted at preventing unwarranted convictions.
