= Nelson v. Campbell =

- Supreme Court of the United States

Argued March 29, 2004 Decided May 24, 2004
- Full case name: David L. Nelson, Petitioner v. Donal Campbell, Commissioner, Alabama Department of Corrections, et al.
- Docket no.: 03-6821
- Citations: 541 U.S. 637 (more) 124 S. Ct. 2117; 158 L. Ed. 2d 924
- Argument: Oral argument

Court membership
- Chief Justice William Rehnquist Associate Justices John P. Stevens · Sandra Day O'Connor; Antonin Scalia · Anthony Kennedy; David Souter · Clarence Thomas; Ruth Bader Ginsburg · Stephen Breyer

Case opinion
- Majority: O'Connor, joined by unanimous

Laws applied
- Eighth Amendment to the United States Constitution; Section 1983

Nelson v. Campbell, 541 U.S. 637 (2004), was a case decided by the United States Supreme Court considering whether a prisoner's appeal of proposed execution procedures was equivalent to a habeas corpus petition. The court held unanimously that an appeal of proposed execution procedures is different from a habeas corpus petition because it is not an appeal of a conviction or sentence.

== Background ==
Throughout the night of December 31, 1977 and January 1, 1978, David Larry Nelson killed James Dewey Cash, a cab driver, and Wilson Woodrow Thompson. Nelson had previously pleaded guilty to second degree murder for beating eighty-two-year-old Oliver King to death in a Birmingham, Alabama, parking lot in 1971. Nelson served six years of a twelve year prison sentence for King's death.

In 1979, a jury found Nelson guilty of capital murder and he was sentenced to death. Nelson was resentenced twice, receiving the death penalty both times. Nelson filed a federal habeas petition challenging the most recent death sentence, which was denied by the United States District Court for the Middle District of Alabama. On June 3, 2002, the United States Court of Appeals for the Eleventh Circuit affirmed the District Court's denial of Nelson's first federal habeas petition, claiming it was essentially the same as a second habeas petition. Alabama's sole method of execution was electrocution until July 1, 2002, when they changed to lethal injection. Alabama allowed inmates to opt for electrocution until July 1, 2002. Nelson did not file a punctual request opting for execution, resulting in a waiver of this option.

Nelson then filed a civil rights action against officials three days prior to his scheduled execution, pursuant to 42 USC § 1983 of the Civil Rights Act of 1871. Because Nelson's veins were compromised from long-term drug use, Alabama planned to use a "cut-down" procedure to access Nelson's veins, which required making a two-inch incision into his arm or leg to bypass veins that had collapsed. Nelson claimed that the use of this procedure would violate the Eighth Amendment to the United States Constitution because potential complications from the procedure included hemorrhage, death by asphyxia, and cardiovascular collapse. Both the District Court and the Eleventh Circuit refused to allow Nelson's claim to be heard. Nelson sought a permanent injunction against use of the cut-down procedure as well as a temporary stay of execution a stay of execution so that the District Court could consider the merits of his claim. On October 9, 2003, less than three hours before he was scheduled to be executed, the Supreme Court granted Nelson a temporary stay of execution. In November 2009, Nelson died at the age of 64 while on death row.

== Supreme Court decision ==
The Supreme Court unanimously held that an appeal of proposed execution procedures is different from a habeas corpus petition because it is not an appeal of a conviction or sentence, so a prisoner challenging the procedures for his execution can base his Eighth Amendment claim on Section 1983. Furthermore, the opinion claimed that Alabama had conceded a prisoner who needed medical treatment that required access to a vein could challenge the procedure as inadequate medical care. Nelson presented testimony that the cut-down procedure was "dangerous and antiquated." The Court stated that it saw "no reason on the face of the complaint to treat petitioner's claim differently solely because he has been condemned to die."
