= Walton v. Arizona =

- Supreme Court of the United States

Argued January 17, 1990 Decided June 27, 1990
- Full case name: Jeffrey Alan Walton v. State of Arizona
- Citations: 497 U.S. 639 (more) 110 S. Ct. 3047; 111 L. Ed. 2d 511; 1990 U.S. LEXIS 3462

Case history
- Prior: Defendant was convicted of first-degree murder in an Arizona superior court and sentenced to death. The Arizona Supreme Court affirmed his conviction and sentence; cert. granted to U.S. Supreme Court.

Holding
- Under the Sixth Amendment, a jury need not pass on the aggravated factors required to impose a death sentence under Arizona law. Under the Eighth Amendment, the words "especially heinous, cruel, or depraved" were not unconstitutionally vague because the Arizona Supreme Court had developed an adequately narrow interpretation of those words.

Court membership
- Chief Justice William Rehnquist Associate Justices William J. Brennan Jr. · Byron White; Thurgood Marshall · Harry Blackmun; John P. Stevens · Sandra Day O'Connor; Antonin Scalia · Anthony Kennedy

Case opinions
- Majority: White (Parts I, II, V), joined by Rehnquist, O'Connor, Scalia, Kennedy
- Plurality: White (Parts III, IV), joined by Rehnquist, O'Connor, Kennedy
- Concurrence: Scalia (in part and in judgment)
- Dissent: Brennan, joined by Marshall
- Dissent: Blackmun, joined by Brennan, Marshall, Stevens
- Dissent: Stevens

Laws applied
- U.S. Const. amend. VI, VIII
- Superseded by
- Ring v. Arizona, 536 U.S. 584 (2002)

Walton v. Arizona, 497 U.S. 639 (1990), was a United States Supreme Court case that upheld two important aspects of the capital sentencing scheme in Arizona—judicial sentencing and the aggravating factor "especially heinous, cruel, or depraved"—as not unconstitutionally vague. The Court overruled the first of these holdings in Ring v. Arizona, 536 U.S. 584 (2002). The second of the holdings was not overturned.

== Background ==
On the night of March 2, 1986, Walton and his two codefendants entered a bar in Tucson, Arizona, set on finding someone at random to rob, kidnap, and leave stranded in the desert. The person they chose was Thomas Powell, an off-duty Marine. The three robbed Powell at gunpoint and forced him into his car. Then they drove him out into the desert. While Walton's codefendants sat in the car with the radio turned up, Walton and Powell marched out into the desert. Walton threw Powell down on the ground and shot him once in the head. Walton bragged to his co-defendants that he had "never seen a man pee in his pants before." After Walton was arrested a week later, he led the police to Powell's body. The medical examiner revealed that Powell did not die instantly from the gunshot; rather, he had been blinded and rendered unconscious by the gunshot, and only died six days later from dehydration, starvation, and pneumonia.

=== Procedural history ===
A jury convicted Walton of first-degree murder under Arizona's alternate definitions of the crime, either premeditated murder or felony murder. As provided by Arizona law, the trial judge then conducted a sentencing hearing. The State proved two aggravating factors—that the murder was committed in an "especially heinous, cruel, or depraved manner," and that it was committed for pecuniary gain. In mitigation, he argued his relative youth (he was 20) and his diminished capacity to appreciate the wrongfulness of his conduct. The trial judge found both aggravating factors beyond a reasonable doubt and that the mitigating factors were not sufficiently substantial to call for leniency. The judge then imposed a death sentence.

The Arizona Supreme Court affirmed the conviction and sentence. With respect to the finding that the murder was committed in an especially heinous, cruel, or depraved manner, the court observed that under its prior case law, the murder was cruel in light of the evidence that Powell had some uncertainty as to his ultimate fate, and the murder was depraved in light of the evidence that Walton had relished the killing. Reviewing the death sentence independently, it found that the death sentence was appropriate on these facts. While Walton's case was pending on direct appeal, the Ninth Circuit had ruled that Arizona's capital sentencing scheme was unconstitutional. The United States Supreme Court agreed to review Walton's case in order to resolve this split.

== Jury determination of facts necessary to support the death sentence ==
Walton's first contention before the Court was that "every finding of fact underlying the sentencing decision must be made by a jury, not by a judge, and that the Arizona scheme would be constitutional only if a jury decides what aggravating and mitigating circumstances are present in a given case and the trial judge then imposes the sentence based on those findings." But the Court had consistently rejected the suggestion that the Constitution required jury sentencing. Aggravating factors were not "elements" of the crime; as the Court had previously held, they were merely standards to guide the choice between a death sentence or a sentence of life imprisonment. Moreover, the Constitution does allow a judge to make the findings required by Enmund v. Florida and Tison v. Arizona. The Enmund/Tison finding is not a substantive limit on the definition of a crime, and neither were aggravating factors. Accordingly, the Sixth Amendment did not require a jury to pass on aggravating factors.

Justice Scalia concurred in this part of the holding in Walton. It would be another eight years before he would first express his view that every fact necessary to a criminal defendant's punishment must be submitted to a jury and proved beyond a reasonable doubt, and six more years after that before that view would become fully articulated as the law of the land.

== "Heinous, cruel, or depraved" aggravating factor is not unconstitutionally vague ==
In two earlier decisions, the Court had ruled that aggravating factors imposing the death penalty where the murder was "outrageously or wantonly vile, horrible, or inhuman," or where the murder was "especially heinous, atrocious, or cruel," was unconstitutionally vague. In Walton, however, the Court reversed this trend and upheld Arizona's "especially heinous, cruel, or depraved" aggravating factor against a similar challenge.

Under Gregg v. Georgia and its companion cases, the death penalty was only constitutional because states provided for jury sentencing—or at a very minimum, jury factfinding at sentencing—and appellate review of all death sentences. The Court had to concede that words such as "outrageously vile" and "especially heinous, atrocious, or cruel" were vague without further definition. In the prior decisions where the Court had struck down aggravating factors for vagueness, the jury instructions did not define the terms for the jury, and state supreme court decisions did not define these words any further. These two flaws had led the Court to strike down death sentences predicated on these findings because they posed too great a risk that the death sentences had been imposed arbitrarily or capriciously.

But the Arizona system was different in both these areas. First, a jury was not involved in the sentencing phase of a capital case at all—a judge sitting alone presided over the sentencing hearing and made both the preliminary findings of fact and the ultimate decision. Because judges were presumed to follow the law, they needed no guidance in finding a killing to be "heinous, cruel, or depraved" in the correct circumstances. Second, the Arizona Supreme Court had developed a body of law that defined the words "heinous, cruel, or depraved." Thus, there were legal standards available for trial judges to follow in imposing the death sentence. For the Walton Court, these key differences meant that Arizona's "especially heinous, cruel, or depraved" aggravating factor satisfied the dictates of the Eighth Amendment.

=== Counter-arguments ===
In spite of these developments, Walton contended that the Arizona Supreme Court's definitions had still been arbitrarily applied in his case. The Court recast this argument as a challenge to the proportionality review the Arizona Supreme Court had conducted, and then dismissed it because it deemed proportionality review to be unnecessary in the face of the adequate definition of "especially heinous, cruel, and depraved" the Arizona Supreme Court had developed. Furthermore, "the Arizona Supreme Court plainly undertook its proportionality review in good faith and found that Walton's sentence was proportional to the sentence imposed in cases similar to his." When the Court approved modern capital sentencing systems in 1976, it did so in part because states had undertaken this kind of proportionality review. In Walton, however the Court abandoned any further requirement that the states ensure the death penalty is expressly reserved for the worst of the worst by explicitly comparing the facts of individual cases.

Justice Blackmun disagreed with the Court's conclusion that the judge-only sentencing and appellate definition of "heinous, cruel, or depraved" allowed it to uphold Walton's death sentence. In the Court's view, the state supreme court's definition of the words "heinous, cruel, or depraved" provided "meaningful guidance" to trial judges charged with carrying out sentencing hearings and applying the standards the Arizona Supreme Court had propounded. Justice Blackmun pointed out that "the State Supreme Court's opinions, however, will serve to narrow [a trial judge's] discretion only if that body of case law articulates a construction of the aggravating circumstance that is coherent and consistent, and that meaningfully limits the range of homicides to which the aggravating factor will apply." In Justice Blackmun's opinion, there was no such definition to be found in Arizona law.

In 1977, the Arizona Supreme Court took its first steps toward defining the words "heinous, cruel or depraved" by turning to dictionary definitions. "Heinous" meant "hatefully or shockingly evil"; "cruel" meant "disposed to inflict pain, especially in a wanton, insensate or vindictive manner"; and "depraved" meant "marked by debasement, corruption, perversion or deterioration". In other words, the words "especially heinous, cruel, or depraved" were meant to operate to "set the crime apart from the usual or the norm." In 1983, the court expanded this definition. "Cruelty" focused on the "pain and distress visited upon the victim," while "heinous" and "depraved" "go to the mental state and attitude of the perpetrator as reflected in his words and actions." The majority in Walton reasoned that these cases, along with other decisions applying the definitions to specific crimes, provided "meaningful guidance to the sentencer" that satisfied the Eighth Amendment's requirement of standardized capital sentencing.

Canvassing the Arizona Supreme Court's prior decisions reviewing death sentences on appeal, Blackmun concluded that Arizona's definition of "heinous, cruel, or depraved" was so broad as to be meaningless. In other words, because there were "few first-degree murders which the Arizona Supreme Court would not define as especially heinous or depraved," the aggravating circumstance did not serve its constitutional role of narrowing the class of murderers who were eligible for the death penalty. Under Arizona case law, a murder was "heinous" if the murderer used more force than necessary to accomplish the killing, but "cruel" if he used less so that the victim suffers too much before dying. "I do not believe that an aggravating factor which requires only that the victim be conscious and aware of his danger for some measurable period before the killing occurs can be said to provide a 'principled way to distinguished this case, in which the death penalty was imposed, from the many cases in which it was not.'"

== See also ==
- List of United States Supreme Court cases
- List of United States Supreme Court cases by the Rehnquist Court
- List of United States Supreme Court cases, volume 497
- Lists of United States Supreme Court cases by volume
