= Lockett v. Ohio =

- Supreme Court of the United States

Argued January 17, 1978 Decided July 3, 1978
- Full case name: Lockett v. Ohio
- Citations: 438 U.S. 586 (more) 98 S. Ct. 2954; 57 L. Ed. 2d 973; 1978 U.S. LEXIS 133

Case history
- Prior: State v. Lockett, 49 Ohio St. 2d 48, 358 N.E.2d 1062 (1976); cert. granted, 434 U.S. 889 (1977).

Holding
- The Ohio statute violated the Eighth and Fourteenth Amendments in failing to require consideration of all mitigating factors surrounding the accused murderer before coming to the decision to apply the death penalty.

Court membership
- Chief Justice Warren E. Burger Associate Justices William J. Brennan Jr. · Potter Stewart; Byron White · Thurgood Marshall; Harry Blackmun · Lewis F. Powell Jr. William Rehnquist · John P. Stevens

Case opinions
- Majority: Burger (parts I and II), joined by Stewart, White, Blackmun, Powell, Rehnquist, Stevens
- Plurality: Burger (part III), joined by Stewart, Powell, Stevens
- Concurrence: Blackmun (in part and in judgment)
- Concurrence: Marshall (in judgment)
- Concur/dissent: White
- Concur/dissent: Rehnquist
- Brennan took no part in the consideration or decision of the case.

Laws applied
- U.S. Const. amends. VIII, XIV

Lockett v. Ohio, 438 U.S. 586 (1978), is a United States Supreme Court case in which the Court held that sentencing authorities must have the discretion to consider at least some mitigating factors, rather than being limited to a specific list of factors.

== Background ==
On January 15, 1975, Sidney Cohen was killed at his pawnshop in Akron during a robbery. Sandra Lockett, the driver of the getaway car, was found guilty under the Ohio statute and sentenced to death.

An Ohio law required that the death penalty was mandatory for felons convicted of aggravated murder unless the victim had induced the offense, the offense was committed under duress or coercion, or the offense was a product of mental deficiencies. The shooter agreed to testify against Lockett in exchange for leniency on the capital murder charge. Lockett was convicted and sentenced to death.

== Question before the Court ==
Does the Ohio statute requiring the death penalty for felons convicted of aggravated murder violate the Eighth and Fourteenth Amendments by limiting the consideration of mitigating factors?

== Opinion of the Court ==
With a 7-1 decision in favor of Lockett, Justice Burger wrote the opinion for the majority. The Court held that the Eighth and Fourteenth Amendments required, in all but the rarest cases, that sentencers consider all mitigating factors surrounding the accused murderer before coming to the decision of applying the death penalty. These mitigating factors include, "a defendant's character or record and any circumstances of the offense proffered as a reason for a sentence less than death." Justice Burger, joined by Justice Stewart, Justice Powell and Justice Stevens concluded that "the limited range of mitigating circumstances that may be considered by the sentencer under the Ohio death penalty statute is incompatible with the Eighth and Fourteenth Amendments." The Court cited Gregg, when the Court had previously approved of a statute that permitted the jury to "consider any aggravating or mitigating circumstances" to support their decision in Lockett.

=== Justice Blackmun's concurrence ===
Justice Blackmun agreed with the majority of the opinion written by the Chief Justice, however, he "would do so for a reason more limited than that which the plurality espouses, and for an additional reason not relied upon by the plurality."

=== Justice Marshall's concurrence ===
In a separate special concurrence from Justice Blackmun, Justice Marshall noted his opposition of the death penalty on its face, and deemed it a form of cruel and unusual punishment in violation of the Eighth Amendment of the Constitution. Justice Marshall notes that "when a death sentence is imposed under the circumstances presented here, I fail to understand how any of my Brethren -- even those who believe that the death penalty is not wholly inconsistent with the Constitution -- can disagree that it must be vacated."

== Subsequent developments ==
The constitutional requirement of individualized consideration was applied in Enmund v. Florida to rule out the death penalty for convictions of accomplices under the felony murder rule, even though the trial court found multiple aggravating circumstances and no mitigating circumstances.

== See also ==
- List of United States Supreme Court cases, volume 438
