= Simmons v. South Carolina =

- Supreme Court of the United States

Argued January 18, 1994 Decided June 17, 1994
- Full case name: Simmons v. South Carolina
- Citations: 512 U.S. 154 (more) 114 S. Ct. 2187; 129 L. Ed. 2d 133

Case history
- Prior: 310 S.C. 439, 427 S.E.2d 175 (1993); cert. granted, 510 U.S. 811 (1993).

Holding
- Where a capital defendant's future dangerousness is at issue, and the only sentencing alternative to death is life imprisonment without the possibility of parole, due process entitles the defendant to inform the jury of his future parole ineligibility.

Court membership
- Chief Justice William Rehnquist Associate Justices Harry Blackmun · John P. Stevens; Sandra Day O'Connor · Antonin Scalia; Anthony Kennedy · David Souter; Clarence Thomas · Ruth Bader Ginsburg

Case opinions
- Plurality: Blackmun, joined by Stevens, Souter, Ginsburg
- Concurrence: Souter, joined by Stevens
- Concurrence: Ginsburg
- Concurrence: O'Connor (in judgment), joined by Rehnquist, Kennedy
- Dissent: Scalia, joined by Thomas

Simmons v. South Carolina, 512 U.S. 154 (1994), is a United States Supreme Court case holding that, where a capital defendant's future dangerousness is at issue, and the only alternative sentence available is life imprisonment without the possibility of parole, the sentencing jury must be informed that the defendant is ineligible for parole.

After being found guilty of murder, Jonathan Dale Simmons faced either execution or life in prison without parole. The State asked the jury to sentence Mr. Simmons to death, in part because he posed a future danger to society. Although Mr. Simmons repeatedly requested permission to instruct the jury that he would never be released from prison, these requests were denied by the trial court. Denying Mr. Simmons his requested instruction violated his due process rights, the Supreme Court held, and presented to the jury a "false choice between sentencing petitioner to death and sentencing him to a limited period of incarceration."

Although Simmons was a plurality opinion, the Supreme Court has repeatedly reaffirmed its holding.

== Facts and procedural history ==
Jonathan Dale Simmons was found guilty of brutally murdering 79 year-old Josie Lamb. Because of Mr. Simmons' criminal history, he was ineligible for parole, and he faced either life in prison or execution for the murder. Defense counsel was prohibited from asking potential jury members about their understanding of parole in voir dire. Following a three-day long trial, Mr. Simmons was convicted. During the penalty phase, the State sought the death penalty and, despite Mr. Simmons' parole ineligibility, repeatedly told the jury that Mr. Simmons posed a danger to society. At one point, the State told the jury that a death sentence would be "an act of self-defense" and a "response of society to someone who is a threat."

Defense counsel repeatedly requested permission to instruct the jury that, because of Mr. Simmons' parole ineligibility, he could never be released from prison. The court denied each of these requests. During deliberations, the sentencing jury asked the judge whether a "life sentence" included the possibility of parole. In response, the judge instructed the jury to "not consider parole eligibility." After receiving this response, the jury sentenced Mr. Simmons to death. The Supreme Court of South Carolina affirmed the sentence, and the Supreme Court of the United States granted certiorari.

== Decision of the Court ==
=== Plurality opinion ===
Justice Blackmun's plurality opinion began by grounding the Court's holding in the Due Process Clause, which requires that no person be executed "'on the basis of information which he had no opportunity to deny or explain.'" The opinion then detailed the trial court proceedings, and the "grievous misperception" created by the emphasis on Mr. Simmons' future dangerousness and the absence of an instruction regarding his parole ineligibility. In particular, the plurality noted the defense's repeated requests – and the court's refusals – to instruct the jury on Mr. Simmons' parole status. The result, the plurality concluded, was that the jury was presented a "false choice between sentencing [him] to death and sentencing him to a limited period of incarceration."

The plurality pointed to several studies which indicated that jurors commonly misunderstood the meaning of the term "life imprisonment" to permit early release. In Mr. Simmons' case, this misunderstanding was exacerbated by the State's repeated emphasis on the danger that Mr. Simmons would pose to society. Of course, the plurality noted, the State was permitted to emphasize future dangerousness as a valid factor for the jury to consider in sentencing. Indeed, several factors in addition to future dangerousness – such as the defendant's age, mental capacity, and prior criminal history – can be appropriate for jury consideration during the sentencing phase and yet inappropriate during the guilt phase of trial. But if the defendant's future dangerousness is considered by the jury, then the jury must be informed that the defendant is ineligible for parole.

=== Concurring opinions ===
==== Justice Souter, joined by Justice Stevens ====
Justice Souter, joined by Justice Stevens, wrote separately to state that he would base the Court's judgment in the Eighth Amendment, which guarantees capital defendants the right to clarify legal terms for the jury. In addition to the due process clause, Justice Souter wrote, the Eighth Amendment imposed "a straightforward duty on the court" to instruct juries on the meaning of a capital defendants' parole eligibility. The concurrence also noted that the court (as opposed to the defense counsel) should have provided the parole ineligibility information, so as to ensure that the jury understood it to be a binding statement of law.

==== Justice Ginsburg ====
Concurring in the opinion, Justice Ginsburg wrote to place the capital defendant's right to inform the jury of his parole ineligibility within his "right to be heard" which is a "core requirement of due process." Contrary to Justice Souter's concurrence, Justice Ginsburg believed that the defendant's right to the parole ineligibility instruction would be satisfied regardless of whether it was provided by the defense counsel or the judge.

==== Justice O'Connor, joined by Chief Justice Rehnquist and Justice Kennedy ====
Justice O'Connor, joined by Chief Justice Rehnquist and Justice Kennedy, wrote to concur in the judgment. The concurring opinion reiterated the State's right to argue future dangerousness to the public, noted the State's right to emphasize the defendant's future dangerousness to the prison population, and acknowledged that the judgment was in contrast to the "general deference to state decisions regarding what the jury should be told about sentencing."

=== Dissent ===
Justice Scalia, joined by Justice Thomas, dissented. In dissent, the Justices described the Court's ruling as a vast departure from the Constitution and an overreach into state power. The plurality opinion, the dissent criticized, was based neither in state practice nor the Court's precedent. The plurality was not based on state practice, Justice Scalia wrote, because most states did not allow capital sentencing juries to receive information regarding parole. And the plurality was not based on the Court's precedent, the dissent argued, because those cases involved an emphasis on future dangerousness that was absent from the Simmons record. Though the Court's opinion might have been "reasonable as a matter of policy," the dissent concluded, the Constitution did not require that it be "followed coast to coast."

== Implications ==
Since Simmons, a jury instruction regarding a capital defendant's parole ineligibility is commonly referred to as a "Simmons instruction." Several studies reveal that providing juries with Simmons instructions can have significant consequences because jurors commonly misunderstand a "life sentence" to include parole, and that this misunderstanding can increase the likelihood of a death sentence. Despite the significance of a Simmons instruction, in 1997 the Court declared that Simmons could not be applied retroactively to overturn death sentences that were final when Simmons was decided.

=== Subsequent state practice ===
==== Evading Simmons ====
Though some commentators predicted Simmons would significantly impact state criminal law, it has been narrowly interpreted by state courts.

Arizona was denying defendants Simmons instructions based on their opportunity to receive clemency. But in 2016, the Supreme Court ruled that the potential for defendants to receive clemency did not obviate the need for a Simmons instruction.

In April 2018, Arizona sought certiorari from the Supreme Court concerning the applicability of Simmons, and the Supreme Court denied certiorari.

After Simmons, South Carolina amended its sentencing scheme and, based on those amendments, claimed that Simmons no longer applied. Pursuant to the amended scheme, jurors first decided whether an aggravating factor was present. If the jury answered no, then the defendant faced life imprisonment or a mandatory minimum of 30 years. If the jury answered yes, then the defendant faced life without parole or execution. In 2001, the Supreme Court reversed the Supreme Court of South Carolina, and ruled that the amendments to South Carolina's sentencing scheme did not render Simmons instructions unnecessary.

Legal commentators have characterized the Supreme Court as "chid[ing]" and "rebuk[ing]" state attempts to evade Simmons.

==== Implementing Simmons ====
Many states have added Simmons instructions into their routine capital sentencing practices. As the Simmons plurality opinion noted, most states were already providing similar instructions for capital defendants facing life without parole or execution. Meanwhile, only 8 states – Florida, North Carolina, Pennsylvania, South Carolina, South Dakota, Texas, Virginia, and Wyoming – did not provide parole ineligibility instructions under the relevant circumstances. Since Simmons, several of those states – including Florida, North Carolina, South Carolina, South Dakota, Texas, and Virginia – have added Simmons-like instructions to their capital sentencing proceedings.

=== Selected Supreme Court and federal courts of appeals cases ===
- Booker v. FL Dep't of Corrections, 684 F.3d 1121, (11th Cir. 2012) (holding that capital defendant who had over one hundred years of consecutive prison sentences to serve before qualifying for parole did not have due process right to Simmons instruction).
- Campbell v. Polk, 447 F.3d 270 (4th Cir. 2006) (holding that it did not violate due process to reject a defendant's request for a Simmons instruction because that defendant would be eligible for parole after 20 years).
- Kelly v. South Carolina, 534 U.S. 246 (2002) (ruling that Simmons required parole ineligibility instruction where defendant's future dangerousness was merely implied, and that the right to a Simmons instruction was not satisfied by defense counsel's comment on the permanence of life imprisonment).
- Mollett v. Mullin, 348 F.3d 902, 914-16 (10th Cir. 2003) (holding that a capital defendant's due process rights were violated by trial court's denial of his request for a Simmons instruction).
- O'Dell v. Netherland, 521 U.S. 151 (1997) (ruling that Simmons constituted a new rule which, pursuant to Teague, could not disturb a final state court judgment through habeas corpus proceedings).
- Ramdass v. Angelone, 530 U.S. 156 (2000) (plurality opinion) (ruling that a capital defendant did not have constitutional right to a Simmons instruction where he did not conclusively establish he was ineligible for parole as a matter of state law).

=== Selected scholarship ===
- John H. Blume, Stephen P. Garvey and Sheri Lynn Johnson, FUTURE DANGEROUSNESS IN CAPITAL CASES: ALWAYS “AT ISSUE," 86 Cornell L. Rev. 397 (January 2001) (arguing that a Simmons instruction is warranted regardless of whether the State puts a defendant's future dangerousness at issue, because future dangerousness is always on the jury members' minds).
- Craig M. Bradley, SOUTH CAROLINA'S DEATH PENALTY ODYSSEY CONTINUES, 38-APR JTLATRIAL 68 (April, 2002).
- Kimberly Metzger, Resolving the "False Dilemma": Simmons v. South Carolina and the Capital-Sentencing Jury's Access to Parole Ineligibility Information, 27 U. Tol. L. Rev. 149 (1995).
- Meghan Shapiro, AN OVERDOSE OF DANGEROUSNESS: HOW “FUTURE DANGEROUSNESS” CATCHES THE LEAST CULPABLE CAPITAL DEFENDANTS AND UNDERMINES THE RATIONALE FOR THE EXECUTIONS IT SUPPORTS, American Journal of Criminal Law, 35 AMJCRL 145, 177 (Spring 2008) (noting that the failure to define "society" as "prison society" when arguing future dangerousness may violate Simmons' prohibition on presenting false choices to the jury in capital proceedings).
- Mary Zaug, SIMMONS v. SOUTH CAROLINA: SAFEGUARDING A CAPITAL DEFENDANT'S RIGHT TO FAIR SENTENCING, 26 Loy. U. Chi. L.J. 511 (1982).

=== Selected treatises and manuals ===
- 40A § 536 American Jurisprudence Homicide (2d Ed., February 2019) (citing Simmons for the defendant's right to a parole ineligibility instruction where he faces life without parole or death and his future dangerousness is at issue).
- Gregory G. Sarno, Adequacy of defense counsel's representation of criminal client regarding appellate and post-conviction remedies, 15 American Law Report 4th 582 (1982).

== See also ==
- Shafer v. South Carolina
- Parole
- Jury instructions
- Capital punishment
