= Outline of capital punishment =

Capital punishment
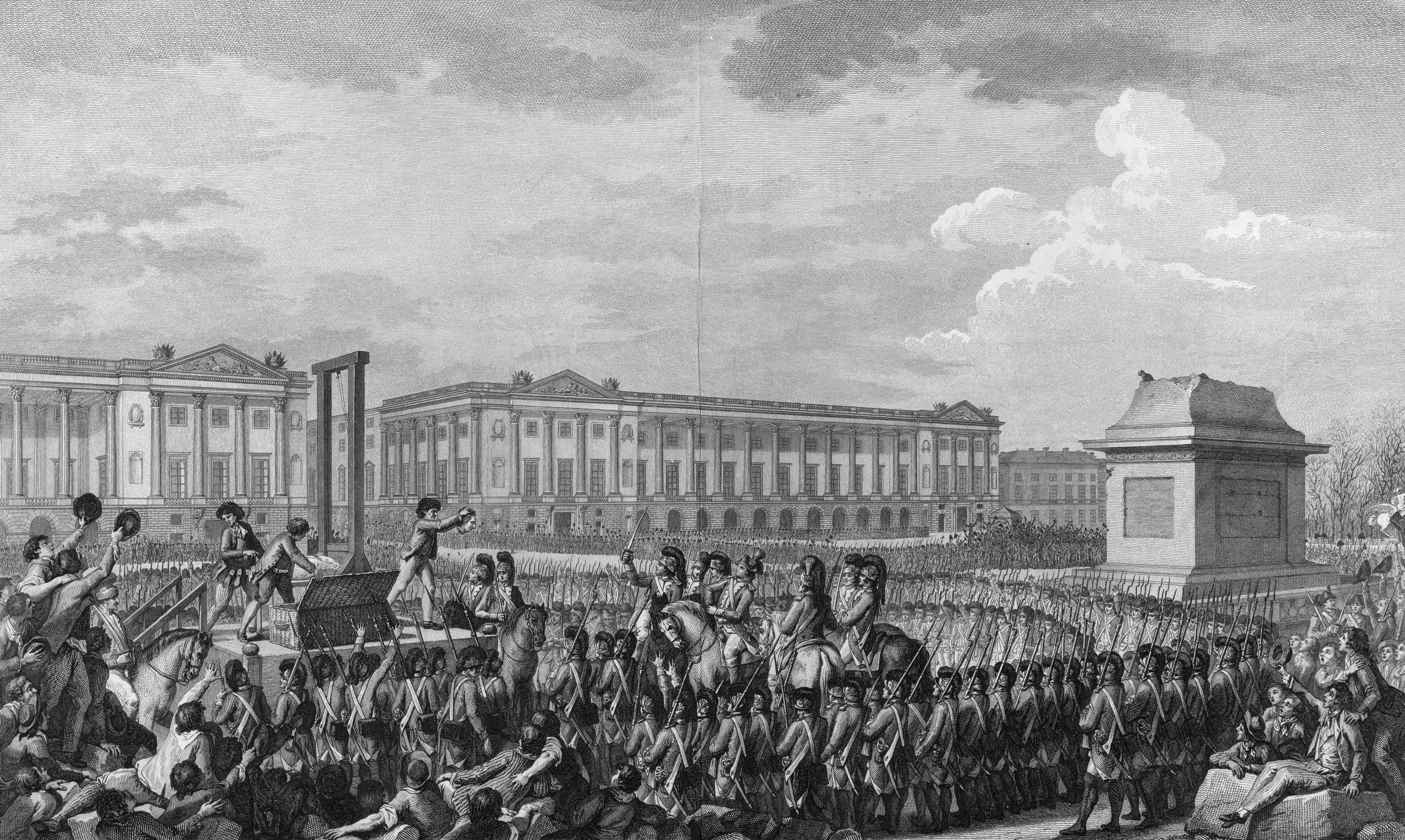
- The execution of Louis XVI, 1793
- Also known as: Death penalty, judicial homicide
- Common methods: Lethal injection, hanging, shooting, decapitation, electrocution, lethal gas, stoning
- Abolitionist for all crimes: 113 countries (end of 2025)
- Countries executing: 17 (2025)
- Recorded executions: At least 2,707 (2025)
- Related: Death row, Executioner, Wrongful execution, List of methods of capital punishment

The following outline is a topical guide to capital punishment articles on Wikipedia.

Capital punishment, also known as the death penalty and formerly called judicial homicide, is the state-sanctioned killing of a person as punishment for actual or supposed misconduct. The sentence ordering such a punishment is a death sentence, and carrying it out is an execution. A prisoner sentenced to death and awaiting execution is condemned and is commonly said to be "on death row". (Note: The term capital (lit. 'of the head', from the Latin capitalis, derived from caput, "head") originally referred to execution by beheading, though many other methods of execution it is still used.)

== Main articles ==
- Capital punishment
- Capital punishment by country
- Capital punishment debate in the United States
- Capital punishment for cannabis trafficking
- Capital punishment for drug trafficking
- Capital punishment for homosexuality
- Capital punishment for non-violent offenses
- Death row
- Executioner
- Libertarian perspectives on capital punishment
- List of methods of capital punishment
- Public execution
- Race and capital punishment in the United States
- Religion and capital punishment
- Summary execution
- Wrongful execution

== Legal ==
=== Legal concepts ===
- Benefit of clergy
- Black cap
- Capital murder
- Capital punishment for cannabis trafficking
- Capital punishment for drug trafficking
- Capital punishment for homosexuality
- Capital punishment for non-violent offenses
- Death recorded
- Death sentence with reprieve
- Death-qualified jury
- Execution warrant
- Felony murder and the death penalty in the United States
- Judicial override
- Pleading the belly
- Stay of execution
- Summary execution

=== Legislation ===
- Anti-Drug Abuse Act of 1988
- Anti-Sacrilege Act
- Black Act 1723
- Bloody Code
- Capital offences in China
- Capital Punishment Amendment Act 1868
- Children and Young Persons Act 1933
- Coinage Offences Act 1832
- Death Penalty for Terrorists Law
- Ecclesiastical Jurisdiction Act 1677
- Forgery Act 1837
- Homicide Act 1957
- Lethal Injection Secrecy Act
- Malicious Injuries to Property Act 1827
- Malicious Injuries to Property (Ireland) Act 1828
- Offences Against the Person Act 1837
- Piracy Act 1837
- Punishment of Offences Act 1837
- Racial Justice Act
- Rocco Code
- Special military tribunal law
- Treachery Act 1940
- Treason by Women Act (Ireland) 1796
- Violent Crime Control and Law Enforcement Act

=== Abolition ===
- Abolition of Mandatory Death Penalty Act 2023
- Caribbean Territories (Abolition of Death Penalty for Murder) Order 1991
- Criminal Law Amendment Act, 1997
- Death Penalty Abolition Act 1973
- Federal Death Penalty Abolition Act
- Forgery, Abolition of Punishment of Death Act 1832
- Judgment of Death Act 1823
- Murder (Abolition of Death Penalty) Act 1965
- Revision of Sentence of Death and Imprisonment for Natural Life Act 2023
- Royal Commission on Capital Punishment 1864–1866
- Royal Commission on Capital Punishment 1949–1953
- Section Eleven of the Constitution of South Africa
- Substitution of Punishments of Death Act 1841
- Twenty-first Amendment of the Constitution of Ireland

=== International law ===
- LaGrand case
- Resolutions concerning death penalty at the United Nations
- Second Optional Protocol to the International Covenant on Civil and Political Rights
- Soering v United Kingdom

=== Referendums ===
- 1879 Swiss referendums
- 1972 California Proposition 17
- 1978 California Proposition 7
- 1978 United States Virgin Islands death penalty referendum
- 1979 Guamanian referendum
- 1990 Bermudian death penalty referendum
- 2001 Irish constitutional referendums
- 2012 California Proposition 34
- 2016 California Proposition 62
- 2016 California Proposition 66

=== Case law ===
==== United States ====
- Aikens v. California
- Andres v. United States
- Atkins v. Virginia
- Ayers v. Belmontes
- Baze v. Rees
- Beck v. Alabama
- Bell v. Cone
- Bigby v. Dretke
- Bobby v. Bies
- Breard v. Greene
- Brumfield v. Cain
- Bucklew v. Precythe
- Caldwell v. Mississippi
- Callins v. Collins
- Coker v. Georgia
- Cruz v. Arizona
- Davila v. Davis
- Davis v. Ayala
- Dunn v. Ray
- Enmund v. Florida
- Felker v. Turpin
- Florida v. Nixon
- Ford v. Wainwright
- Furman v. Georgia
- Glass v. Louisiana
- Glossip v. Chandler
- Glossip v. Gross
- Glossip v. Oklahoma
- Godfrey v. Georgia
- Gregg v. Georgia
- Gutierrez v. Saenz
- Hall v. Florida
- Harbison v. Bell
- Harris v. Alabama
- Heckler v. Chaney
- Herrera v. Collins
- Hildwin v. Florida
- Hill v. McDonough
- Hopkins v. Reeves
- House v. Bell
- Hurst v. Florida
- Kahler v. Kansas
- Kansas v. Marsh
- Kennedy v. Louisiana
- Leal Garcia v. Texas
- Leland v. Oregon
- Lisenba v. California
- Lockett v. Ohio
- Louisiana ex rel. Francis v. Resweber
- Lowenfield v. Phelps
- Madison v. Alabama
- Maples v. Thomas
- Martel v. Clair
- Maynard v. Cartwright
- McCleskey v. Kemp
- McGautha v. California
- McKinney v. Arizona
- McWilliams v. Dunn
- Medellín v. Texas
- Moore v. Texas (2017)
- Morgan v. Illinois
- Nance v. Ward
- O'Dell v. Netherland
- Oregon v. Guzek
- Panetti v. Quarterman
- Payne v. Tennessee
- Penry v. Lynaugh
- People v. Anderson
- People v. LaValle
- Pitts and Lee v. Florida
- Powell v. Alabama
- Pulley v. Harris
- Ring v. Arizona
- Robinson v. United States
- Rooney v. North Dakota
- Roper v. Simmons
- Rubenstein v. State
- Schlup v. Delo
- Schriro v. Summerlin
- Shafer v. South Carolina
- Skipper v. South Carolina
- Smith v. Spisak
- Smith v. Texas (2007)
- South Carolina v. Gathers
- Spaziano v. Florida
- Stanford v. Kentucky
- Sumner v. Shuman
- Tennard v. Dretke
- Thompson v. Oklahoma
- Tison v. Arizona
- United States v. Tsarnaev
- Uttecht v. Brown
- Walton v. Arizona
- Whitmore v. Arkansas
- Wilkerson v. Utah
- Williams v. Pennsylvania
- Witherspoon v. Illinois
- Wood v. Allen
- Zant v. Stephens

==== Other countries ====
- Bowe v R
- Boyce v R
- Callan v Ireland & The Attorney General
- Kindler v Canada (Minister of Justice)
- Machhi Singh case
- Matthew v The State
- Miller v R
- Mohamed v President of the Republic of South Africa
- Ong Ah Chuan v Public Prosecutor
- Pratt v A-G for Jamaica
- R v Hughes
- Reference Re Ng Extradition
- S v Makwanyane
- Shafqat Emmanuel and Shagufta Kausar blasphemy case
- United States v Burns
- Yong Vui Kong v Public Prosecutor

=== Trials ===
- Burgos trials
- Conviction and exoneration of Glenn Ford
- Death sentence of Erfan Soltani
- Death sentences during the Mahsa Amini protests
- Eichmann trial
- People's Court (Germany)
- Sanity proceeding for Patrick Eugene Prendergast
- Testimony in the trial of Patrick Eugene Prendergast
- Trial and conviction of Charles Flores
- Trial of Dzhokhar Tsarnaev
- Trial of John Brown
- Trial of Louis Riel
- Trial of Patrick Eugene Prendergast

== Juvenile capital punishment ==
- Capital punishment for juveniles in the United States
- Juvenile death row inmate (Japan)
- Scottsboro Boys
- Stop Child Executions Campaign

== Methods ==
- Blood eagle
- Blowing from a gun
- Brazen bull
- Breaking wheel
- Burning of women in England
- Crucifixion
- Crushing (execution)
- Crux simplex
- Damnatio ad bestias
- Death by boiling
- Death by burning
- Death by sawing
- Decapitation
- Decimation (punishment)
- Descriptions in antiquity of the execution cross
- Drowning pit
- Execution by drowning
- Execution by elephant
- Execution by firing squad
- Execution by shooting
- Execution of Thai royalty
- Falling (execution)
- Flaying
- Forced suicide
- Fustuarium
- Garrote
- Gas chamber
- Hanged, drawn and quartered
- Ikido
- Immurement
- Impalement
- Ishikozume
- Lingchi
- List of methods of capital punishment
- Mazzatello
- Nine familial exterminations
- Poena cullei
- Relaxado en persona
- Republican marriage
- Scaphism
- Stoning
- Strangling
- Suffocation in ash
- Waist chop

=== Decapitation ===
- Beheading in the Ottoman Empire
- Capital punishment in Saudi Arabia
- Decapitation
- Decapitation in Islam
- Executioner's sword
- Guillotine
- Halifax Gibbet
- Hiroyasu Koga
- Linköping Bloodbath
- Maiden (guillotine)
- Stockholm Bloodbath

=== Lethal injection ===
- Julius Mount Bleyer
- Romell Broom
- Jay Chapman (physician)
- Execution van
- Lethal injection
- Carlo Musso
- Participation of medical professionals in American executions

=== Hanging ===
- Dule tree
- Gallows
- Hanging
- Hanging in the United States
- Hangman's knot
- Necktie social
- Official Table of Drops
- Patibular fork
- Sierra County Sheriff's Gallows
- Upright jerker

=== Gibbeting ===
- Caxton Gibbet
- Combe Gibbet
- Gibbet of Montfaucon
- Gibbeting

=== Electricity ===
- Harold P. Brown
- Electric chair
- Gruesome Gertie
- New York State Electrician
- Old Smokey
- Old Sparky
- Alfred P. Southwick
- State electrician
- Yellow Mama

=== Gas chamber ===
- Execution of Kenneth Eugene Smith
- Gas chamber
- Inert gas asphyxiation

=== Equipment ===
- Brazen bull
- Breaking wheel
- Caxton Gibbet
- Combe Gibbet
- Crux simplex
- Drowning pit
- Dule tree
- Execution chamber
- Execution van
- Executioner's sword
- Gallows
- Garrote
- Genickschussanlage
- Gibbet of Montfaucon
- Gibbeting
- Joseph-Ignace Guillotin
- Gas chamber
- Guillotine
- Halifax Gibbet
- Hangman's knot
- Fred A. Leuchter
- Maiden (guillotine)
- Official Table of Drops
- Patibular fork
- Scaffold (execution site)
- Sierra County Sheriff's Gallows
- Upright jerker

==== Electric chairs ====
- Electric chair
- Gruesome Gertie
- Old Smokey
- Old Sparky
- Yellow Mama

== Notable executions ==
- Jerry Abershawe
- Eugene Aram
- Richard Arnold and William Critchard
- Spence Broughton
- Robert Carlton
- Anthony Chebatoris
- James Cliffen
- Mark Codman
- Marie-Josephte Corriveau
- Saint Evilasius
- Execution of Elizabeth Jeffries and John Swan
- Execution of Frederick Lashley
- William Fairall
- Victor Feguer
- Gibbeting of James Cook
- Gibbeting of John Haines and Thomas Clarke
- Gibbeting of Robert and William Drewitt
- Gibbeting of Stephen Watson
- Gibbeting of Tom Otter
- Gibbeting of William Bennington
- Gibbeting of William Hawkins and Abraham Tull
- Arthur Gray (Hawkhurst Gang)
- John the Painter
- William Kidd
- Thomas Kingsmill (Hawkhurst Gang)
- Last use of capital punishment in Spain
- Michal Morey
- Leonard Shockley
- Anatoly Slivko
- Amy Spain
- James Stewart of the Glen
- William Suffolk
- Trial and execution of José Rizal
- Charles Vane

=== Botched executions ===
- Charles Becker
- Joseph Lewis Clark
- Frank J. Coppola
- Ángel Nieves Díaz
- Roxana Druse
- Eva Dugan
- John Louis Evans
- Wilbert Lee Evans
- Execution of Clayton Lockett
- Execution of Dennis McGuire
- Execution of Joe Nathan James Jr.
- Execution of John Grant
- Execution of Joseph Wood
- Execution of Kenneth Eugene Smith
- Earl Gardner (murderer)
- Arthur Gooch (criminal)
- Jimmy Lee Gray
- Donald Harding
- Rattlesnake James
- William Kemmler
- Tom Ketchum
- John McCaffary
- Pedro Medina (murderer)
- Gordon Stewart Northcott
- James Paster and Stephen McCoy
- Christa Pike
- Elizabeth Potts
- Martin Stickles
- Jesse Tafero
- Wallace Wilkerson
- Daniel Wilkinson (murderer)
- William Williams (murderer)
- Henry Wirz

=== Wrongful executions ===
- Joe Arridy
- Derek Bentley
- Celia (slave)
- Chaska (Dakota)
- Sir Edward Crosbie, 5th Baronet
- Timothy Evans
- Execution of Zulfikar Ali Bhutto
- Anacleto González Flores
- Thomas and Meeks Griffin
- Robert Hubert
- Huugjilt
- Ernst Jennrich
- Judicial murder
- Leschi (Nisqually)
- Hirtzel Levy
- August Lütgens
- William Jackson Marion
- Mahmood Hussein Mattan
- Saleh Mohammadi
- Nora Parham
- Miguel Pro
- Salvador Puig Antich
- Chipita Rodriguez
- Colin Campbell Ross
- Atefeh Sahaaleh
- Maolra Seoighe
- Nie Shubin
- George Stinney
- Bruno Tesch (antifascist)
- Meir Tobianski
- Ankarette Twynho
- John Ury
- Tommy Lee Walker
- Alexander McClay Williams
- Campden Wonder
- Wrongful execution

=== Filmed executions ===
- 2016 Saudi Arabia mass execution
- Gheorghe Alexianu
- Ion Antonescu
- Mihai Antonescu
- Jenny-Wanda Barkmann
- Elisabeth Becker
- Beheading of Ghulam Nabi
- Pierre Bonny
- Curt Bruns
- Elena Ceaușescu
- Nicolae Ceaușescu
- Manuel Martínez Coronado
- Andrew Grant DeYoung
- Anton Dostler
- Execution of Al-Sadek Hamed Al-Shuwehdy
- Execution of Saddam Hussein
- Karl Hermann Frank
- Roberto Girón and Pedro Castillo
- Saddam Hussein
- Preap In
- Dr. Ishola
- Wanda Klaff
- Adnan Menderes
- James Morelli
- Ewa Paradies
- Johann Pauls
- Berthold Schenk Graf von Stauffenberg
- Gerda Steinhoff
- Frank E. Tolbert
- Trial and execution of Nicolae and Elena Ceaușescu
- Turki bin Saud Al Kabeer
- Eugen Weidmann

=== Public executions ===
- 1969 Baghdad hangings
- Crucifixion
- Crucifixion of Jesus
- Didrik Slagheck
- Execution by elephant
- Execution of Charles I of England
- Execution of Louis XVI
- Execution of Majidreza Rahnavard
- Execution of Tczew hostages
- Execution of the Báb
- Gibbeting
- Hisakazu Tanaka
- Linköping Bloodbath
- Old Town Square execution
- Public execution
- Public execution in Dębica
- Public executions in Iran
- Saigon Execution
- Saleh Mohammadi
- Stockholm Bloodbath
- Stoning of Aisha Ibrahim Duhulow
- Street executions in Warsaw (1943–1944)
- Theatre of Horror
- Ann Wyley

== Religion ==
- Capital punishment in the Bible
- May God have mercy upon your soul
- People of Faith Against the Death Penalty
- Religion and capital punishment

=== Christianity ===
- Benefit of clergy
- Blood atonement
- Catholic Church and capital punishment
- Relaxado en persona
- Secular arm

=== Islam ===
- Capital punishment in Islam
- Capital punishment in the Gaza Strip
- Decapitation in Islam
- Hirabah
- Hudud
- Mofsed-e-filarz
- Qisas
- Stoning in Islam

=== Judaism ===
- Capital punishment in Judaism

=== Other religions ===
- Execution of the Báb
- Peshotanu (punishment)

== Opposition ==
- Capital punishment debate in the United States
- Cities for Life Day
- Cornelia Grumman
- International Commission Against the Death Penalty
- Robert Kingsley
- Libertarian perspectives on capital punishment
- On Crimes and Punishments
- World Coalition Against the Death Penalty
- World Day Against the Death Penalty

== Organizations ==
- Campaign to End the Death Penalty
- Canadian Coalition Against the Death Penalty
- Capital Jury Project
- Conservatives Concerned About the Death Penalty
- Death Penalty Focus
- Death Penalty Information Center
- Hands Off Cain
- International Commission Against the Death Penalty
- National Coalition to Abolish the Death Penalty
- People of Faith Against the Death Penalty
- Reprieve (organisation)
- StopExecutionsinIran
- Texas Moratorium Network
- Texas Students Against the Death Penalty
- Witness to Innocence
- World Coalition Against the Death Penalty

== By region ==
- Capital punishment in the Middle East
- Capital punishment in Europe

== By country ==
- Capital punishment by country
- Capital punishment by the United States federal government
- Capital punishment in Abkhazia
- Capital punishment in Afghanistan
- Capital punishment in Albania
- Capital punishment in Algeria
- Capital punishment in American Samoa
- Capital punishment in Andorra
- Capital punishment in Angola
- Capital punishment in Argentina
- Capital punishment in Armenia
- Capital punishment in Aruba
- Capital punishment in Australia
- Capital punishment in Austria
- Capital punishment in Azerbaijan
- Capital punishment in Bangladesh
- Capital punishment in Belarus
- Capital punishment in Belgium
- Capital punishment in Benin
- Capital punishment in Bhutan
- Capital punishment in Bolivia
- Capital punishment in Bosnia and Herzegovina
- Capital punishment in Botswana
- Capital punishment in Brazil
- Capital punishment in Brunei
- Capital punishment in Bulgaria
- Capital punishment in Burkina Faso
- Capital punishment in Burundi
- Capital punishment in Cambodia
- Capital punishment in Cameroon
- Capital punishment in Canada
- Capital punishment in Cape Verde
- Capital punishment in Chad
- Capital punishment in Chile
- Capital punishment in China
- Capital punishment in Colombia
- Capital punishment in Costa Rica
- Capital punishment in Croatia
- Capital punishment in Cuba
- Capital punishment in Cyprus
- Capital punishment in Djibouti
- Capital punishment in Egypt
- Capital punishment in El Salvador
- Capital punishment in Equatorial Guinea
- Capital punishment in Eritrea
- Capital punishment in Estonia
- Capital punishment in Eswatini
- Capital punishment in Ethiopia
- Capital punishment in Fiji
- Capital punishment in Finland
- Capital punishment in France
- Capital punishment in Gabon
- Capital punishment in Georgia (country)
- Capital punishment in Germany
- Capital punishment in Ghana
- Capital punishment in Gibraltar
- Capital punishment in Greece
- Capital punishment in Grenada
- Capital punishment in Guam
- Capital punishment in Guatemala
- Capital punishment in Guernsey
- Capital punishment in Guinea
- Capital punishment in Guinea-Bissau
- Capital punishment in Guyana
- Capital punishment in Hong Kong
- Capital punishment in Hungary
- Capital punishment in Iceland
- Capital punishment in India
- Capital punishment in Indonesia
- Capital punishment in Iran
- Capital punishment in Iraq
- Capital punishment in Ireland
- Capital punishment in Israel
- Capital punishment in Italy
- Capital punishment in Ivory Coast
- Capital punishment in Jamaica
- Capital punishment in Japan
- Capital punishment in Jersey
- Capital punishment in Jordan
- Capital punishment in Kazakhstan
- Capital punishment in Kenya
- Capital punishment in Kuwait
- Capital punishment in Kyrgyzstan
- Capital punishment in Laos
- Capital punishment in Latvia
- Capital punishment in Lebanon
- Capital punishment in Lesotho
- Capital punishment in Liberia
- Capital punishment in Libya
- Capital punishment in Liechtenstein
- Capital punishment in Lithuania
- Capital punishment in Luxembourg
- Capital punishment in Macau
- Capital punishment in Madagascar
- Capital punishment in Malawi
- Capital punishment in Malaysia
- Capital punishment in Mali
- Capital punishment in Malta
- Capital punishment in Mauritania
- Capital punishment in Mauritius
- Capital punishment in Mexico
- Capital punishment in Moldova
- Capital punishment in Monaco
- Capital punishment in Mongolia
- Capital punishment in Montenegro
- Capital punishment in Mozambique
- Capital punishment in Myanmar
- Capital punishment in Namibia
- Capital punishment in Nauru
- Capital punishment in Nepal
- Capital punishment in New Zealand
- Capital punishment in Niger
- Capital punishment in Nigeria
- Capital punishment in Niue
- Capital punishment in North Korea
- Capital punishment in North Macedonia
- Capital punishment in Norway
- Capital punishment in Oman
- Capital punishment in Pakistan
- Capital punishment in Papua New Guinea
- Capital punishment in Paraguay
- Capital punishment in Peru
- Capital punishment in Poland
- Capital punishment in Portugal
- Capital punishment in Puerto Rico
- Capital punishment in Qatar
- Capital punishment in Romania
- Capital punishment in Russia
- Capital punishment in Rwanda
- Capital punishment in Saint Kitts and Nevis
- Capital punishment in Samoa
- Capital punishment in San Marino
- Capital punishment in Saudi Arabia
- Capital punishment in Senegal
- Capital punishment in Serbia
- Capital punishment in Seychelles
- Capital punishment in Sierra Leone
- Capital punishment in Singapore
- Capital punishment in Slovakia
- Capital punishment in Slovenia
- Capital punishment in Somalia
- Capital punishment in South Africa
- Capital punishment in South Korea
- Capital punishment in South Sudan
- Capital punishment in Spain
- Capital punishment in Sri Lanka
- Capital punishment in Sudan
- Capital punishment in Suriname
- Capital punishment in Sweden
- Capital punishment in Switzerland
- Capital punishment in Syria
- Capital punishment in Taiwan
- Capital punishment in Tajikistan
- Capital punishment in Tanzania
- Capital punishment in Thailand
- Capital punishment in the Bahamas
- Capital punishment in the British Indian Ocean Territory
- Capital punishment in the Central African Republic
- Capital punishment in the Comoros
- Capital punishment in the Cook Islands
- Capital punishment in the Czech Republic
- Capital punishment in the Democratic Republic of the Congo
- Capital punishment in the Gambia
- Capital punishment in the Gaza Strip
- Capital punishment in the Isle of Man
- Capital punishment in the Maldives
- Capital punishment in the Netherlands
- Capital punishment in the Philippines
- Capital punishment in the Republic of the Congo
- Capital punishment in the Soviet Union
- Capital punishment in the United Arab Emirates
- Capital punishment in the United Kingdom
- Capital punishment in the United States
- Capital punishment in Timor-Leste
- Capital punishment in Togo
- Capital punishment in Tonga
- Capital punishment in Trinidad and Tobago
- Capital punishment in Tunisia
- Capital punishment in Turkey
- Capital punishment in Turkmenistan
- Capital punishment in Uganda
- Capital punishment in Ukraine
- Capital punishment in Uruguay
- Capital punishment in Uzbekistan
- Capital punishment in Vatican City
- Capital punishment in Venezuela
- Capital punishment in Vietnam
- Capital punishment in Yemen
- Capital punishment in Zambia
- Capital punishment in Zimbabwe

=== By state ===
- Capital punishment in Alabama
- Capital punishment in Alaska
- Capital punishment in Arizona
- Capital punishment in Arkansas
- Capital punishment in California
- Capital punishment in Colorado
- Capital punishment in Connecticut
- Capital punishment in Delaware
- Capital punishment in Florida
- Capital punishment in Georgia (U.S. state)
- Capital punishment in Hawaii
- Capital punishment in Idaho
- Capital punishment in Illinois
- Capital punishment in Indiana
- Capital punishment in Iowa
- Capital punishment in Kansas
- Capital punishment in Kentucky
- Capital punishment in Louisiana
- Capital punishment in Maine
- Capital punishment in Maryland
- Capital punishment in Massachusetts
- Capital punishment in Michigan
- Capital punishment in Minnesota
- Capital punishment in Mississippi
- Capital punishment in Missouri
- Capital punishment in Montana
- Capital punishment in Nebraska
- Capital punishment in Nevada
- Capital punishment in New Hampshire
- Capital punishment in New Jersey
- Capital punishment in New Mexico
- Capital punishment in New York
- Capital punishment in North Carolina
- Capital punishment in North Dakota
- Capital punishment in Ohio
- Capital punishment in Oklahoma
- Capital punishment in Oregon
- Capital punishment in Pennsylvania
- Capital punishment in Rhode Island
- Capital punishment in South Carolina
- Capital punishment in South Dakota
- Capital punishment in Tennessee
- Capital punishment in Texas
- Capital punishment in the District of Columbia
- Capital punishment in Utah
- Capital punishment in Vermont
- Capital punishment in Virginia
- Capital punishment in Washington (state)
- Capital punishment in West Virginia
- Capital punishment in Wisconsin
- Capital punishment in Wyoming

== Works ==
=== Art ===
- Big Electric Chair
- The Execution of the Doge Marino Faliero
- No Human Way to Kill

=== Books ===
- Dead Man Walking (book)
- Death at Midnight
- Death by a Thousand Cuts (book)
- The Death Penalty: Opposing Viewpoints
- In This Timeless Time
- Live from Death Row
- Reflections on the Guillotine
- Réflexions sur la peine capitale
- The Rope, the Chair, and the Needle
- Theatre of Horror
- Ultimate Punishment
- Uncensored from Texas Death Row

=== Documentaries ===
- After Innocence
- Aileen: Life and Death of a Serial Killer
- At the Death House Door
- Death and the Judge
- Fourteen Days in May
- Hangman's Graveyard
- I Am Ready, Warden
- In Prison My Whole Life
- Interviews Before Execution
- Into the Abyss (film)
- Life and Death Row
- Mr. Death: The Rise and Fall of Fred A. Leuchter, Jr.
- The Phantom (2021 film)
- Procedure 769, Witness to an Execution
- Robert Blecker Wants Me Dead
- The State of Texas vs. Melissa
- There Will Be No Stay

== Lists ==
- Bibliography of the history of capital punishment
- List of capital crimes in the Torah
- List of cases affected by the Kho Jabing case
- List of death row inmates in Japan
- List of death row inmates in the United States
- List of death row inmates in the United States who have exhausted their appeals
- List of executioners
- List of executions in Japan since 1993
- List of exonerated death row inmates
- List of hanging trees
- List of heads of state and government who were sentenced to death
- List of last meals
- List of methods of capital punishment
- List of most recent executions by jurisdiction
- List of people executed by lethal injection
- List of people executed in India
- List of people executed in Michigan
- List of people gibbeted in the United Kingdom
- List of punishments for murder in the United States
- List of United States Supreme Court opinions involving capital punishment
- List of women on death row in the United States

== Miscellaneous ==
- 10 years without the right of correspondence
- 2011 executions in Iran
- Brutalization
- Bullet fee
- Death row
- Death row phenomenon
- M. Watt Espy
- George Fell
- Marvin Gabrion
- James Grigson
- Judicial murder
- Last meal
- Joshua Marquis
- Peshotanu (punishment)
- Mark Prothero
- Gary Lee Sampson
- Shot at Dawn Memorial
- Stalin's shooting lists
- Max Stephan
- Volunteer (capital punishment)

== See also ==
- Outline of criminal justice
- Outline of ethics
- Outline of law
