= Juvenile death row inmate (Japan) =

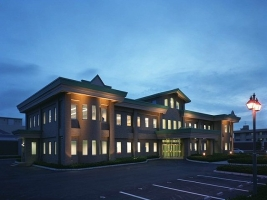
Hakodate Juvenile Prison in Hakodate, Japan.

In Japan, a juvenile death row inmate (少年死刑囚, shōnen shikeishū) is a convict who has been sentenced to death by a criminal trial for committing a capital crime before turning 20 years old.

== Overview ==
The Juveniles Act stipulates in Article 51 (Mitigation of Death Penalty and Life Imprisonment) that “life imprisonment is imposed on a person in a case where the person is under 18 of age at the time of commission of an offense to be dealt with by death penalty.” However, it is possible to sentence a defendant who commits a capital offense to death in cases where the defendant was 18 or 19 years of age at the time of the offense.

Since the end of WWII (1945 – February 2024), there have been 45 such inmates in Japan. All of them have been male; no female death row inmates have been confirmed as of February 2024.

However, not all of them have been executed. As of February 2024, a total of seven have not been executed and are still alive.

Furthermore, six death row inmates have had their sentences commuted through pardons, and one person was proven to be falsely accused and was acquitted upon retrial.

== Real-name reporting ==
Article 61 of the Juveniles Act prohibits reporting information such as name, age, occupation, and residence that can lead to the identity of a juvenile who has been sentenced by a family court or who has been prosecuted as a juvenile. This policy is out of consideration for rehabilitation and social reintegration. However, since the 2011 appellate court ruling of the Osaka-Aichi-Gifu serial lynching murder case, where multiple juvenile defendants were sentenced to death for the first time, national newspapers (Yomiuri, Asahi, SANKEI, NIKKEI), excluding Mainichi Shimbun, along with news agencies (Kyodo News, Jiji Press), and TV stations have switched to real-name reporting once their death sentence was finalized.

On the other hand, Mainichi Shimbun, Chunichi Shimbun, and Tokyo Shimbun continued anonymous reporting at the time the death sentence is confirmed. However, these newspapers switched to real-name reporting similar to other news outlets when the death row inmate for the Ichikawa Family Murder Case, killing four (which occurred in 1992, and the perpetrator was 19 years old) was executed in 2017.
