= Bibliography of the history of capital punishment =

- The Idle 'Prentice Executed at Tyburn, plate 11 of Industry and Idleness by William Hogarth, 1747, National Gallery of Art
- Subject: History of capital punishment and methods of execution
- Chronological scope: Antiquity to the present
- Geographic scope: Worldwide
- Language: English-language scholarship, with French, German and Italian works
- Arrangement: Chronological, geographic and thematic
- Citation style: APA 7

Capital punishment
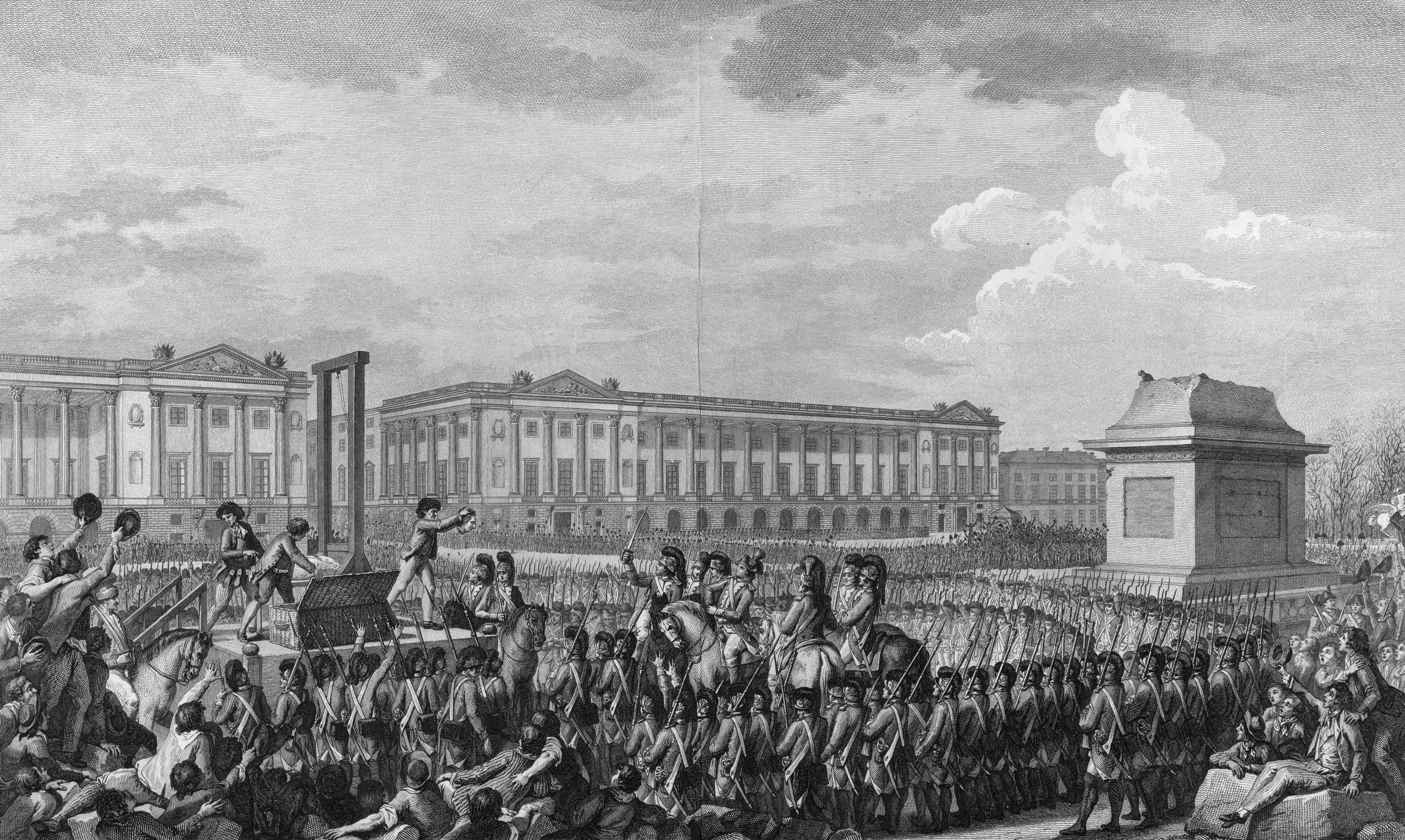
- The execution of Louis XVI on 21 January 1793; engraving by Isidore Stanislas Helman after Charles Monnet, 1794
- Also known as: Death penalty Judicial homicide (historical)
- Sentence: Death sentence
- Condemned held on: Death row
- Methods: See list

Legal status (end of 2025)
- Abolitionist for all crimes: 113 countries
- Abolitionist (ordinary crimes): 9 countries
- Abolitionist (in practice): 23 countries
- Practicing: 54 countries
- Details: Capital punishment by country

This is a bibliography of the history of capital punishment. This bibliography is limited to history and excludes other disciplines unless they contain a meaningful amount of historical material.

Capital punishment, also known as the death penalty and formerly called judicial homicide, is the state-sanctioned killing of a person as punishment for actual or supposed misconduct. The sentence ordering that an offender be punished in such a manner is called a death sentence, and the act of carrying out the sentence is an execution. A prisoner who has been sentenced to death and awaits execution is condemned and is commonly referred to as being "on death row". Etymologically, the term capital (lit. 'of the head', derived via the Latin capitalis from caput, "head") refers to execution by beheading.

Bibliography contains academic-level English-language books (including translations) and journal articles, published mainly post World War II. (Note: Works published before World War II should be limited to areas where there is no significant post-World War II books on the subject or when the work in question has significant historical merit.) Book entries may have references to reviews published in academic journals or major newspapers when these could be considered helpful. These reference reviews also function as a resource to find other works on this subject.

Works listed here are cited in the notes or bibliographies of scholarly sources. Each is published by an academic or major trade press, written by a recognized expert, or substantially reviewed in scholarly journals; borderline cases are omitted. A selection of primary sources are included. Many of the books below carry their own bibliographies; see Further reading section for longer ones, and External links section for historical sites and museums.

Citations follow APA style. (Note: Entries are in plain text APA 7 format without templates; templates are used only for reviews and notes.) Book have citations to academic journal or mainstream published reviews when available. For books only partly about the subject, give relevant chapter or section titles where useful and available. Translators of the original-language edition are included when possible. In cases where a title or name has appeared with more than one English spelling, use the most recent published form is used and a footnote documents any earlier title under which the work appeared.

== General surveys ==
- Garnsey, P. (2026). Rethinking capital punishment. Cambridge University Press. doi:10.1017/9781009760089
- Hammel, A. (2010). Ending the death penalty. Palgrave Macmillan. doi:10.1057/9780230277366
- Hood, R., & Hoyle, C. (2008). The death penalty: A worldwide perspective. Oxford University Press. doi:10.1093/acprof:oso/9780199228478.001.0001
- Megivern, J. J. (1997). The death penalty: An historical and theological survey. Paulist Press.
- Sarat, A., & Boulanger, C. (Eds.). (2005). The cultural lives of capital punishment. Stanford University Press. doi:10.1515/9780804767712
- Sarat, A., & Martschukat, J. (Eds.). (2011). Is the death penalty dying? European and American perspectives. Cambridge University Press. doi:10.1017/CBO9780511974380
- Schabas, W. A. (2002). The abolition of the death penalty in international law. Cambridge University Press. doi:10.1017/cbo9780511494109
- Stearns, P. N. (2023). Punishment in world history. Routledge. doi:10.4324/9781003427261

== Ancient Near East and Greece ==
- Bar, S. (2021). Death by stoning in the Hebrew Bible and in post-biblical traditions. Old Testament Essays, 34(3), 789–805. doi:10.17159/2312-3621/2021/v34n3a8
- Berkowitz, B. A. (2006). Execution and invention: Death penalty discourse in early rabbinic and Christian cultures. Oxford University Press. doi:10.1093/0195179196.001.0001
- Cantarella, E. (1991). I supplizi capitali in Grecia e a Roma. Rizzoli.
- Muhlestein, K. (2008). Royal executions: Evidence bearing on the subject of sanctioned killing in the Middle Kingdom. Journal of the Economic and Social History of the Orient, 51(2), 181–208. doi:10.1163/156852008x307429
- Radner, K. (2015). High visibility punishment and deterrent: Impalement in Assyrian warfare and legal practice. Zeitschrift für Altorientalische und Biblische Rechtsgeschichte, 21, 103–128.
- Rosivach, V. J. (1987). Execution by stoning in Athens. Classical Antiquity, 6(2), 232–248. JSTOR 25010870
- Todd, S. C. (2000). How to execute people in fourth-century Athens. In V. J. Hunter & J. C. Edmondson (Eds.), Law and social status in classical Athens (pp. 31–51). Oxford University Press. doi:10.1093/oso/9780199240111.003.0002

== Classical Rome ==
- Bauman, R. A. (1996). Crime and punishment in ancient Rome. Routledge.
- Coleman, K. M. (1990). Fatal charades: Roman executions staged as mythological enactments. Journal of Roman Studies, 80, 44–73. JSTOR 300280
- Cook, J. G. (2012). Crucifixion as spectacle in Roman Campania. Novum Testamentum, 54(1), 68–100. doi:10.1163/156853611x589651
- Harley, F. (2019). Crucifixion in Roman antiquity: The state of the field. Journal of Early Christian Studies, 27(2), 303–323. doi:10.1353/earl.2019.0022
- Kyle, D. G. (1998). Spectacles of death in ancient Rome. Routledge.

== Medieval world ==
- Cohen, E. (1989). Symbols of culpability and the universal language of justice: The ritual of public executions in late medieval Europe. History of European Ideas, 11(1–6), 407–416. doi:10.1016/0191-6599(89)90228-3
- Edgerton, S. Y., Jr. (1985). Pictures and punishment: Art and criminal prosecution during the Florentine Renaissance. Cornell University Press.
- Gates, J. P., & Marafioti, N. (Eds.). (2014). Capital and corporal punishment in Anglo-Saxon England. Boydell Press. doi:10.1017/9781782042983
- Jankofsky, K. P. (1980). Public executions in England in the late Middle Ages: The indignity and dignity of death. OMEGA - Journal of Death and Dying, 10(1), 43–57. doi:10.2190/kqkp-1bvd-4c7x-3yak
- Merback, M. B. (1999). The thief, the cross and the wheel: Pain and the spectacle of punishment in medieval and Renaissance Europe. University of Chicago Press.
- Olson, T. (2006). The medieval blood sanction and the divine beneficence of pain: 1100–1450. Journal of Law and Religion, 22(1), 63–129. doi:10.1017/s0748081400003222
- Prosperi, A. (2020). Crime and forgiveness: Christianizing execution in medieval Europe (J. Carden, Trans.). Harvard University Press. doi:10.4159/9780674240261
- Reynolds, A. (2009). Anglo-Saxon deviant burial customs. Oxford University Press. doi:10.1093/acprof:oso/9780199544554.001.0001
- Royer, K. (2013). The English execution narrative, 1200–1700. Routledge.
- Ruiter, K., & Ashby, S. P. (2018). Different strokes: Judicial violence in Viking-Age England and Scandinavia. Viking and Medieval Scandinavia, 14, 153–184. doi:10.1484/j.vms.5.116393
- Summerson, H., & Barron, C. (2025). Lives at stake: Attitudes and responses to the burning of women in medieval England, c.1200–c.1450. History, 111(396), 322–346. doi:10.1111/1468-229x.70068

=== Medieval Islamic world ===
- Anthony, S. W. (2014). Crucifixion and death as spectacle: Umayyad crucifixion in its late antique context. American Oriental Society.
- Fierro, M. (2008). Decapitation of Christians and Muslims in the medieval Iberian Peninsula: Narratives, images, contemporary perceptions. Comparative Literature Studies, 45(2), 137–164. doi:10.1353/cls.0.0020
- Lange, C. (2020). Torture and public executions in the Islamic Middle Period (eleventh–fifteenth centuries). In M. S. Gordon, R. W. Kaeuper & H. Zurndorfer (Eds.), The Cambridge world history of violence: Vol. 2. AD 500–AD 1500 (pp. 164–184). Cambridge University Press. doi:10.1017/9781316661291.009
- Marsham, A. (2011). Public execution in the Umayyad period: Early Islamic punitive practice and its late antique context. Journal of Arabic and Islamic Studies, 11, 101–136. doi:10.5617/jais.4608
- Neggaz, N. (2020). The many deaths of the last ʿAbbāsid caliph al-Mustaʿṣim bi-llāh (d. 1258). Journal of the Royal Asiatic Society, 30(4), 585–612. doi:10.1017/S1356186320000267
- Widodo, A. P. (2024). Crucifixion in the Muslim world: An overview of prominent cases from 600s to 1300s CE. IIUM Journal of Religion and Civilisational Studies, 7(2), 159–174.

== Modern ==
=== Europe ===
- Bastien, P. (2011). Une histoire de la peine de mort: Bourreaux et supplices, Paris-Londres, 1500–1800. Éditions du Seuil.
- Evans, R. J. (1996). Rituals of retribution: Capital punishment in Germany, 1600–1987. Oxford University Press. doi:10.1093/oso/9780198219682.001.0001
- Harrington, J. F. (2013). The faithful executioner: Life and death, honor and shame in the turbulent sixteenth century. Farrar, Straus and Giroux.
- Krogh, T. (2012). A Lutheran plague: Murdering to die in the eighteenth century. Brill. doi:10.1163/9789004221376
- Lunenfeld, M. (2000). Pedagogy of fear: Making the secret-Jew visible at the public autos de fe of the Spanish royal Inquisition. Shofar: An Interdisciplinary Journal of Jewish Studies, 18(3), 77–92. doi:10.1353/sho.2000.0024
- Martschukat, J. (2000). Inszeniertes Töten: Eine Geschichte der Todesstrafe vom 17. bis zum 19. Jahrhundert. Böhlau.
- Schild, W. (2011). Töten als Rechtsakt: Zur Geschichte der Hinrichtung. Paragrana, 20(1), 32–50. doi:10.1524/para.2011.0003
- Spierenburg, P. (1984). The spectacle of suffering: Executions and the evolution of repression: From a preindustrial metropolis to the European experience. Cambridge University Press.
- Stuart, K. (1999). Defiled trades and social outcasts: Honor and ritual pollution in early modern Germany. Cambridge University Press.
- van Dülmen, R. (1990). Theatre of Horror: Crime and Punishment in Early Modern Germany (E. Neu, Trans.). Polity Press.

=== Britain and the empire ===
- Anderson, S. (2020). A history of capital punishment in the Australian colonies, 1788 to 1900. Springer International Publishing. doi:10.1007/978-3-030-53767-8
- Bedau, H. A. (1983). Bentham's utilitarian critique of the death penalty. Journal of Criminal Law and Criminology, 74(3), 1033–1064. JSTOR 1143143
- Black, L. (2022). Gender and punishment in Ireland. Manchester University Press. doi:10.7765/9781526145291
- Briggs, J. (2019). Exemplary punishment: T. R. L. MacInnes, the Department of Indian Affairs, and Indigenous executions, 1936–52. Canadian Historical Review, 100(3), 398–438. doi:10.3138/chr.2018-0044
- Campbell, J. (2015). Murder appeals, delayed executions, and the origins of Jamaican death penalty jurisprudence. Law and History Review, 33(2), 435–466. doi:10.1017/s0738248015000103
- Cooper, D. D. (1974). The lesson of the scaffold: The public execution controversy in Victorian England. Allen Lane.
- Devereaux, S. (2009). Recasting the theatre of execution: The abolition of the Tyburn ritual. Past & Present, 202(1), 127–174. doi:10.1093/pastj/gtn019
- Gatrell, V. A. C. (1994). The hanging tree: Execution and the English people, 1770–1868. Oxford University Press. doi:10.1093/oso/9780198204138.001.0001
- Hay, D., Linebaugh, P., Rule, J. G., Thompson, E. P., & Winslow, C. (1975). Albion's fatal tree: Crime and society in eighteenth-century England. Allen Lane.
- King, P., & Ward, R. (2015). Rethinking the Bloody Code in eighteenth-century Britain: Capital punishment at the centre and on the periphery. Past & Present, 228(1), 159–205. doi:10.1093/pastj/gtv026
- Koestler, A. (1956). Reflections on hanging. Macmillan.
- Linebaugh, P. (1992). The London hanged: Crime and civil society in the eighteenth century. Cambridge University Press.
- McGowen, R. (1987). The body and punishment in eighteenth-century England. The Journal of Modern History, 59(4), 652–679. doi:10.1086/243281
- McGowen, R. (1994). Civilizing punishment: The end of the public execution in England. Journal of British Studies, 33(3), 257–282. doi:10.1086/386055
- Potter, H. (1993). Hanging in judgment: Religion and the death penalty in England. SCM Press.
- Radzinowicz, L. (1948). A history of English criminal law and its administration from 1750: Vol. 1. The movement for reform, 1750–1833. Stevens and Sons.
- Strange, C. (2020). The death penalty and sex murder in Canadian history. University of Toronto Press. doi:10.3138/9781487538101

=== France ===
- André, M. (2019). Requérir la peine de mort: Les magistrats militaires entre la France et l'Algérie durant la guerre d'indépendance algérienne. 20 & 21. Revue d'Histoire, (142), 19–32. doi:10.3917/vin.142.0019
- Arasse, D. (1989). The guillotine and the terror (C. Miller, Trans.). Allen Lane.
- Bastien, P. (2006). L'exécution publique à Paris au XVIIIe siècle: Une histoire des rituels judiciaires. Champ Vallon.
- Beccaria, C. (1995). Beccaria: 'On crimes and punishments' and other writings (R. Davies, Trans.; R. Bellamy, Ed.). Cambridge University Press. doi:10.1017/cbo9780511802485 (Original work published 1764)
- Camus, A. (1960). Resistance, rebellion, and death (J. O'Brien, Trans.). Alfred A. Knopf.
- Carol, A. (2012). Physiologie de la Veuve: Une histoire médicale de la guillotine. Champ Vallon.
- Foucault, M. (1977). Discipline and punish: The birth of the prison (A. Sheridan, Trans.). Pantheon Books. (Original work published 1975)
- Friedland, P. (2012). Seeing justice done: The age of spectacular capital punishment in France. Oxford University Press. doi:10.1093/acprof:oso/9780199592692.001.0001
- Janes, R. (1991). Beheadings. Representations, 35, 21–51. JSTOR 2928715
- Le Naour, J.-Y. (2011). Histoire de l'abolition de la peine de mort: Deux cents ans de combats. Perrin.
- Taïeb, E. (2004). Le débat sur la publicité des exécutions capitales: Usages et enjeux du questionnaire de 1885. Genèses, (54), 130–147. doi:10.3917/gen.054.0130
- Taïeb, E. (2011). La guillotine au secret: Les exécutions publiques en France, 1870–1939. Belin.

=== Russia ===
- Kollmann, N. S. (2012). Pictures at an execution: Johann Georg Korb's "Execution of the Strel'tsy". In B. Boeck, R. E. Martin, & D. Rowland (Eds.), Dubitando: Studies in history and culture in honor of Donald Ostrowski (pp. 399–407). Slavica Publishers.
- Light, M., & Kovalev, N. (2013). Russia, the death penalty, and Europe: The ambiguities of influence. Post-Soviet Affairs, 29(6), 528–566. doi:10.1080/1060586X.2013.816104
- Marasinova, E. (2017). The prayer of an empress and the death penalty moratorium in eighteenth-century Russia. Journal of Religious History, Literature and Culture, 3(2), 36–55. doi:10.16922/jrhlc.3.2.3
- Marasinova, E. (2019). The death penalty moratorium in 18th-century Russia. Quaestio Rossica, 7(4), 1086–1106. doi:10.15826/qr.2019.4.426
- Rawson, D. (1984). The death penalty in late tsarist Russia: An investigation of judicial procedures. Russian History, 11(1), 29–52. doi:10.1163/18763316-i0000002
- Skorobogatov, Y. (2026). Fate in my hands: The death penalty in the Soviet Union. University of Chicago Press.
- van den Berg, G. P. (1983). The Soviet Union and the death penalty. Soviet Studies, 35(2), 154–174. doi:10.1080/09668138308411469

=== South Asia ===
- Brown, M. (2014). Penal power and colonial rule. Routledge. doi:10.4324/9780203880814
- Fisch, J. (1983). Cheap lives and dear limbs: The British transformation of the Bengal criminal law, 1769–1817. Franz Steiner.
- Kolsky, E. (2010). Colonial justice in British India: White violence and the rule of law. Cambridge University Press.
- McClure, A. (2022). Killing in the name of? Capital punishment in colonial and postcolonial India. Law and History Review, 41(2), 365–385. doi:10.1017/S0738248022000335
- Singha, R. (1998). A despotism of law: Crime and justice in early colonial India. Oxford University Press.
- Wagner, K. A. (2017). The skull of Alum Bheg: The life and death of a rebel of 1857. Hurst.

=== The United States ===
- Bakken, G. M. (Ed.). (2010). Invitation to an execution: A history of the death penalty in the United States. University of New Mexico Press.
- Banner, S. (2002). The death penalty: An American history. Harvard University Press. doi:10.4159/9780674020511
- Barton, J. C. (2014). Literary executions: Capital punishment and American culture, 1820–1925. Johns Hopkins University Press. doi:10.1353/book.32640
- Chammah, M. (2021). Let the Lord sort them: The rise and fall of the death penalty. Crown.
- Cohen, D. A. (1993). Pillars of salt, monuments of grace: New England crime literature and the origins of American popular culture, 1674–1860. Oxford University Press.
- Davis, D. B. (1957). The movement to abolish capital punishment in America, 1787–1861. The American Historical Review, 63(1), 23–46. doi:10.1086/ahr/63.1.23
- Garland, D. (2010). Peculiar institution: America's death penalty in an age of abolition. Belknap Press of Harvard University Press. JSTOR j.ctvjnrt2s
- Hartnett, S. J. (2010). Executing democracy: Vol. 1. Capital punishment and the making of America, 1683–1807. Michigan State University Press.
- Hartnett, S. J. (2012). Executing democracy: Vol. 2. Capital punishment and the making of America, 1835–1843. Michigan State University Press.
- Jouet, M. (2023). Death penalty abolitionism from the Enlightenment to modernity. The American Journal of Comparative Law, 71(1), 46–97. doi:10.1093/ajcl/avad011
- Kotch, S. (2019). Lethal state: A history of the death penalty in North Carolina. University of North Carolina Press. doi:10.5149/northcarolina/9781469649870.001.0001
- LaChance, D. (2016). Executing freedom: The cultural life of capital punishment in the United States. University of Chicago Press. doi:10.7208/chicago/9780226066721.001.0001
- Malkani, B. (2018). Slavery and the death penalty. Routledge. doi:10.4324/9781315609300
- Masur, L. P. (1989). Rites of execution: Capital punishment and the transformation of American culture, 1776–1865. Oxford University Press.
- Ogletree, C. J., Jr., & Sarat, A. (Eds.). (2006). From lynch mobs to the killing state: Race and the death penalty in America. New York University Press. doi:10.18574/nyu/9780814762424.001.0001
- Steiker, C. S., & Steiker, J. M. (2020). The rise, fall, and afterlife of the death penalty in the United States. Annual Review of Criminology, 3(1), 299–315. doi:10.1146/annurev-criminol-011518-024721
- Trotti, M. A. (2022). The end of public execution: Race, religion, and punishment in the American South. University of North Carolina Press. doi:10.5149/northcarolina/9781469670416.001.0001

==== Race and capital punishment ====
- Baldus, D. C., Pulaski, C., & Woodworth, G. (1983). Comparative review of death sentences: An empirical study of the Georgia experience. The Journal of Criminal Law and Criminology, 74(3), 661. JSTOR 1143133
- Baldus, D. C., Woodworth, G., & Pulaski, C. A. (1990). Equal justice and the death penalty: A legal and empirical analysis. Northeastern University Press.
- Bowers, W. J., & Pierce, G. L. (1980). Arbitrariness and discrimination under post-Furman capital statutes. Crime & Delinquency, 26(4), 563–632. doi:10.1177/001112878002600409
- Eberhardt, J. L., Davies, P. G., Purdie-Vaughns, V. J., & Johnson, S. L. (2006). Looking deathworthy: Perceived stereotypicality of Black defendants predicts capital-sentencing outcomes. Psychological Science, 17(5), 383–386. doi:10.1111/j.1467-9280.2006.01716.x
- Garfinkel, H. (1949). Research note on inter- and intra-racial homicides. Social Forces, 27(4), 369–381. JSTOR 2572490
- Gross, S. R., & Mauro, R. (1984). Patterns of death: An analysis of racial disparities in capital sentencing and homicide victimization. Stanford Law Review, 37(1), 27. JSTOR 1228652
- Gross, S. R., & Mauro, R. (1989). Death and discrimination: Racial disparities in capital sentencing. Northeastern University Press.
- Kennedy, R. L. (1988). McCleskey v. Kemp: Race, capital punishment, and the Supreme Court. Harvard Law Review, 101(7), 1388. JSTOR 1341399
- Paternoster, R. (1983). Race of victim and location of crime: The decision to seek the death penalty in South Carolina. The Journal of Criminal Law and Criminology, 74(3), 754. JSTOR 1143134
- Radelet, M. L., & Pierce, G. L. (1985). Race and prosecutorial discretion in homicide cases. Law & Society Review, 19(4), 587–621. JSTOR 3053422
- Wolfgang, M. E., & Riedel, M. (1973). Race, judicial discretion, and the death penalty. The Annals of the American Academy of Political and Social Science, 407(1), 119–133. doi:10.1177/000271627340700110
- Zeisel, H. (1981). Race bias in the administration of the death penalty: The Florida experience. Harvard Law Review, 95(2), 456. JSTOR 1340711

==== Constitutional and legal history ====
- Acker, J. R., & Champagne, R. (2017). The execution of Wallace Wilkerson. Criminal Justice Review, 42(4), 349–367. doi:10.1177/0734016817702193
- Bedau, H. A. (Ed.). (1964). The death penalty in America: An anthology. Doubleday.
- Bessler, J. D. (2012). Cruel and unusual: The American death penalty and the founders' Eighth Amendment. Northeastern University Press.
- Campbell, J. M. (2026). Reluctant abolitionists. Cambridge University Press. doi:10.1017/9781009595209
- Harring, S. L., & Swedlow, K. (2000). "The defendant has seemed to live a charmed life": Hopt v. Utah: Territorial justice, the Supreme Court of the United States, and late nineteenth-century death penalty jurisprudence. Journal of Supreme Court History, 25(1), 40–71. doi:10.1353/sch.2000.0020
- Kirchmeier, J. L. (2015). Imprisoned by the past: Warren McCleskey and the American death penalty. Oxford University Press. doi:10.1093/acprof:oso/9780199967933.001.0001
- Mandery, E. J. (2013). A wild justice: The death and resurrection of capital punishment in America. W. W. Norton.
- Meltsner, M. (1973). Cruel and unusual: The Supreme Court and capital punishment. Random House.
- Oshinsky, D. M. (2010). Capital punishment on trial: Furman v. Georgia and the death penalty in modern America. University Press of Kansas. JSTOR jj.11634941
- Sarat, A. (2005). Mercy on trial: What it means to stop an execution. Princeton University Press. doi:10.1515/9781400826728
- Sarat, A. (2019). The death penalty on the ballot: American democracy and the fate of capital punishment. Cambridge University Press. doi:10.1017/9781108699617
- Steiker, C. S., & Steiker, J. M. (2016). Courting death: The Supreme Court and capital punishment. Harvard University Press. doi:10.4159/9780674974852
- Zimring, F. E. (2003). The contradictions of American capital punishment. Oxford University Press. doi:10.1093/oso/9780195152364.001.0001

==== Deterrence controversy ====
- Sellin, T. (1980). The penalty of death. Sage Publications.
- Sellin, T. (Ed.). (1967). Capital punishment. Harper & Row.
- Strange, C. (2026). The contestation of penal expertise in the age of the expert: Thorsten Sellin and the death penalty in the 1950s. Law and History Review, 44(2), 285–307. doi:10.1017/s0738248026101527
- Zimring, F. E., & Hawkins, G. (1987). Capital punishment and the American agenda. Cambridge University Press.

==== Wrongful convictions ====
- Baumgartner, F. R., De Boef, S. L., & Boydstun, A. E. (2008). The decline of the death penalty and the discovery of innocence. Cambridge University Press. doi:10.1017/CBO9780511790638
- Bedau, H. A., & Radelet, M. L. (1987). Miscarriages of justice in potentially capital cases. Stanford Law Review, 40(1), 21. JSTOR 1228828
- Radelet, M. L., Bedau, H. A., & Putnam, C. E. (1994). In spite of innocence: Erroneous convictions in capital cases. Northeastern University Press.

=== China ===
- Bourgon, J. (2003). Abolishing "cruel punishments": A reappraisal of the Chinese roots and long-term efficiency of the Xinzheng legal reforms. Modern Asian Studies, 37(4), 851–862. doi:10.1017/s0026749x03004050
- Bourgon, J. (2003). Chinese executions: Visualising their differences with European supplices. European Journal of East Asian Studies, 2(1), 153–184. doi:10.1163/157006103765447545
- Bourgon, J. (2006). Le dernier lingchi: Faits, représentations, événement. Études Chinoises, 25(1), 113–171. doi:10.3406/etchi.2006.895
- Brook, T., Bourgon, J., & Blue, G. (2008). Death by a thousand cuts. Harvard University Press. JSTOR j.ctv1dv0tpd
- Lu, H., & Miethe, T. D. (2007). China's death penalty: History, law and contemporary practices. Routledge. doi:10.4324/9780203941300
- Meijer, M. J. (1984). The autumn assizes in Ch'ing law. T'oung Pao, 70(1), 1–17. doi:10.1163/156853284x00017
- Scobell, A. (1990). The death penalty in post-Mao China. The China Quarterly, 123, 503–520. doi:10.1017/S0305741000018890
- Tian, Y. (2025). Debating Chinese cruelty: Summary execution, judicial reform, and extraterritoriality in the late Qing. Late Imperial China, 46(1), 1–40. doi:10.1353/late.2025.a964626
- Trevaskes, S. (2012). The death penalty in contemporary China. Palgrave Macmillan. doi:10.1057/9781137079671
- Xie, X.-Z. (2025). Degrees of death: The hierarchy of capital punishments between strangulation and decapitation in Qing China. OMEGA – Journal of Death and Dying. Advance online publication. doi:10.1177/00302228251317555

=== Japan ===
- Johnson, D. T. (2006). Where the state kills in secret: Capital punishment in Japan. Punishment & Society, 8(3), 251–285. doi:10.1177/1462474506064699
- Johnson, D. T. (2020). The culture of capital punishment in Japan. Palgrave Macmillan. doi:10.1007/978-3-030-32086-7
- Lin, C.-Y. (2025). Death penalty in modern Japan (1868–1945): Evolving execution practices and their societal impact. OMEGA – Journal of Death and Dying. Advance online publication. doi:10.1177/00302228241312490
- Sato, M. (2014). The death penalty in Japan: Will the public tolerate abolition? Springer Fachmedien Wiesbaden. doi:10.1007/978-3-658-00678-5
- Schmidt, P. (2002). Capital punishment in Japan. Brill. doi:10.1163/9789004482999

=== Islamic world ===
- Aykut, E. (2017). Judicial reforms, sharia law, and the death penalty in the late Ottoman Empire. Journal of the Ottoman and Turkish Studies Association, 4(1), 7–30. doi:10.2979/jottturstuass.4.1.02
- Baer, M. (2011). Death in the Hippodrome: Sexual politics and legal culture in the reign of Mehmet IV. Past & Present, 210(1), 61–91. doi:10.1093/pastj/gtq062
- Ekinci, E. B. (2018). Fratricide in Ottoman law. Belleten, 82(295), 1013–1046. doi:10.37879/belleten.2018.1013
- El-Shafei, A. (2025). The colonial metamorphosis of Egyptian capital punishment, 1884–1903. Past & Present. Advance online publication. doi:10.1093/pastj/gtaf030
- Peiffer, E. (2005). The death penalty in traditional Islamic law and as interpreted in Saudi Arabia and Nigeria. William & Mary Journal of Women and the Law, 11(3), 507–539.
- Salgirli, S. (2013). Architectural anatomy of an Ottoman execution. Journal of the Society of Architectural Historians, 72(3), 301–321. doi:10.1525/jsah.2013.72.3.301
- Schwerda, M. X. (2015). Death on display: Mirza Riza Kirmani, prison portraiture and the depiction of public executions in Qajar Iran. Middle East Journal of Culture and Communication, 8(2–3), 172–191. doi:10.1163/18739865-00802003
- Subaşı, T. (2002). The apostasy question in the context of Anglo-Ottoman relations, 1843–44. Middle Eastern Studies, 38(2), 1–34. doi:10.1080/714004459

=== Africa ===
- Hynd, S. (2008). Killing the condemned: The practice and process of capital punishment in British Africa, 1900–1950s. The Journal of African History, 49(3), 403–418. doi:10.1017/s0021853708003988
- Hynd, S. (2010). "The extreme penalty of the law": Mercy and the death penalty as aspects of state power in colonial Nyasaland, c. 1903–47. Journal of Eastern African Studies, 4(3), 542–559. doi:10.1080/17531055.2010.517422
- Hynd, S. (2023). Imperial gallows: Murder, violence and the death penalty in British colonial Africa, c. 1915–60. Bloomsbury Publishing. doi:10.5040/9781350320437
- Kalbing, N. (2014). A matter of life and death: Criminal law and the death penalty in South West Africa (SWA) under South African rule, 1915–1939. South African Historical Journal, 66(2), 249–269. doi:10.1080/02582473.2014.906495
- Novak, A. (2016). The African challenge to global death penalty abolition. Intersentia. doi:10.1017/9781780685465
- Peel, D. (2026). Pathways to abolition: The colonial legacy of the death penalty in sub-Saharan Africa. Critical Criminology, 34(2), 195–215. doi:10.1007/s10612-026-09897-w
- Turrell, R. V. (2004). White mercy: A study of the death penalty in South Africa. Praeger.
- van Laun, B. (2018). Bureaucratically missing: Capital punishment, exhumations, and the afterlives of state documents and photographs. Kronos, 44(1), 123–144. doi:10.17159/2309-9585/2018/v44a8
- Williams, C. (1988). Asante: Human sacrifice or capital punishment? An assessment of the period 1807–1874. International Journal of African Historical Studies, 21(3), 433–441. JSTOR 219449

=== Latin America ===
- Andrade, M. F. de. (2017). A pena de morte e a revolta dos escravos de Carrancas: A origem da "lei nefanda" (10 de junho de 1835). Tempo, 23(2), 264–289. doi:10.1590/TEM-1980-542X2017v230204
- Arancibia Floody, C., Cornejo Cancino, J. T., & González Undurraga, C. (Eds.). (2003). Pena de muerte en Chile colonial: Cinco casos de homicidio de la Real Audiencia. Centro de Investigaciones Diego Barros Arana; RIL Editores.
- Batalla Rosado, J. J. (1995). La pena de muerte durante la colonia —siglo XVI— a partir del análisis de las imágenes de los códices mesoamericanos. Revista Española de Antropología Americana, 25, 71–110.
- López Menéndez, M. (2019). El gesto, el cuerpo y la memoria: Los ecos históricos de la ejecución de Miguel Pro. Historia y Grafía, 26(52), 187–224.
- Ribeiro, J. L. (2005). No meio das galinhas as baratas não têm razão: A lei de 10 de junho de 1835: Os escravos e a pena de morte no Império do Brasil, 1822–1889. Renovar.

=== Other regions ===
- Johnson, D. T., & Zimring, F. E. (2009). The next frontier: National development, political change, and the death penalty in Asia. Oxford University Press. doi:10.1093/acprof:oso/9780195337402.001.0001

== Gender ==
- Baker, D. V. (2008). Black female executions in historical context. Criminal Justice Review, 33(1), 64–88. doi:10.1177/0734016808316782
- Baker, D. V. (2016). Women and capital punishment in the United States: An analytical history. McFarland.
- Ballinger, A. (2000). Dead woman walking: Executed women in England and Wales, 1900–1955. Ashgate.
- Campbell, R. (1984). Sentence of death by burning for women. The Journal of Legal History, 5(1), 44–59. doi:10.1080/01440368408530794
- Devereaux, S. (2005). The abolition of the burning of women in England reconsidered. Crime, Histoire & Sociétés, 9(2), 73–98. doi:10.4000/chs.293
- Farr, K. A. (1997). Aggravating and differentiating factors in the cases of white and minority women on death row. Crime & Delinquency, 43(3), 260–278. doi:10.1177/0011128797043003002
- Farr, K. A. (2000). Defeminizing and dehumanizing female murderers: Depictions of lesbians on death row. Women & Criminal Justice, 11(1), 49–66. doi:10.1300/j012v11n01_03
- O'Shea, K. A. (1999). Women and the death penalty in the United States, 1900–1998. Praeger. doi:10.5040/9798216036845
- Rapaport, E. (1991). The death penalty and gender discrimination. Law & Society Review, 25(2), 367–383. JSTOR 3053803

=== Witchcraft ===
- Behringer, W. (2004). Witches and witch-hunts: A global history. Polity Press.
- Gaskill, M. (2005). Witchfinders: A seventeenth-century English tragedy. Harvard University Press. JSTOR j.ctv253f7tp
- Goodare, J. (2016). The European witch-hunt. Routledge. doi:10.4324/9781315560458
- Larner, C. (1981). Enemies of God: The witch-hunt in Scotland. Chatto & Windus.
- Leeson, P. T., & Russ, J. W. (2018). Witch trials. The Economic Journal, 128(613), 2066–2105. doi:10.1111/ecoj.12498
- Levack, B. P. (1980). The great Scottish witch hunt of 1661–1662. Journal of British Studies, 20(1), 90–108. doi:10.1086/385764
- Levack, B. P. (1987). The witch-hunt in early modern Europe. Longman.
- Midelfort, H. C. E. (1972). Witch hunting in southwestern Germany, 1562–1684: The social and intellectual foundations. Stanford University Press.
- Monter, E. W. (1976). Witchcraft in France and Switzerland: The borderlands during the Reformation. Cornell University Press.
- Norton, M. B. (2002). In the devil's snare: The Salem witchcraft crisis of 1692. Alfred A. Knopf.
- Oster, E. (2004). Witchcraft, weather and economic growth in Renaissance Europe. Journal of Economic Perspectives, 18(1), 215–228. doi:10.1257/089533004773563502
- Soman, A. (1978). The Parlement of Paris and the great witch hunt (1565–1640). The Sixteenth Century Journal, 9(2), 31–44. JSTOR 2539661

== Homosexuality ==
- Asal, V., & Sommer, U. (2016). The religious state and death penalty for sodomy. In Legal path dependence and the long arm of the religious state: Sodomy provisions and gay rights across nations and over time (pp. 63–78). State University of New York Press. doi:10.1515/9781438463254-006
- Boon, L. J. (1989). Those damned sodomites: Public images of sodomy in the eighteenth century Netherlands. Journal of Homosexuality, 16(1–2), 237–248. doi:10.1300/j082v16n01_13
- Crompton, L. (1976). Homosexuals and the death penalty in colonial America. Journal of Homosexuality, 1(3), 277–293. doi:10.1300/j082v01n03_03
- Crompton, L. (1981). The myth of lesbian impunity: Capital laws from 1270 to 1791. Journal of Homosexuality, 6(1–2), 11–25. doi:10.1300/j082v06n01_03
- Crompton, L. (1985). Byron and Greek love: Homophobia in 19th-century England. University of California Press.
- Crompton, L. (2003). Homosexuality and civilization. Harvard University Press. doi:10.4159/9780674030060
- Eriksson, B. (1981). A lesbian execution in Germany, 1721: The trial records. Journal of Homosexuality, 6(1–2), 27–40. doi:10.1300/j082v06n01_04
- Garza Carvajal, F. (2003). Butterflies will burn: Prosecuting sodomites in early modern Spain and Mexico. University of Texas Press. doi:10.7560/701830
- Gilbert, A. N. (1976). Buggery and the British Navy, 1700–1861. Journal of Social History, 10(1), 72–98. doi:10.1353/jsh/10.1.72
- Gilbert, A. N. (1977). Sexual deviance and disaster during the Napoleonic Wars. Albion, 9(1), 98–113. JSTOR 4048221
- Godbeer, R. (1995). "The cry of Sodom": Discourse, intercourse, and desire in colonial New England. The William and Mary Quarterly, 52(2), 259. JSTOR 2946975
- Harvey, A. D. (1978). Prosecutions for sodomy in England at the beginning of the nineteenth century. The Historical Journal, 21(4), 939–948. doi:10.1017/s0018246x00000753
- Krekić, B. (1987). Abominandum crimen: Punishment of homosexuals in Renaissance Dubrovnik. Viator, 18, 337–346. doi:10.1484/j.viator.2.301398
- Labalme, P. H. (1984). Sodomy and Venetian justice in the Renaissance. Tijdschrift voor Rechtsgeschiedenis, 52(3), 217–254. doi:10.1163/157181984x00114
- LeJacq, S. S. (2024). Executing a boy for buggery. In Sexual and gender difference in the British Navy, 1690–1900 (pp. 34–44). Routledge. doi:10.4324/9781003433606-10
- Monter, E. W. (1981). Sodomy and heresy in early modern Switzerland. Journal of Homosexuality, 6(1–2), 41–55. doi:10.1300/j082v06n01_05
- Oaks, R. F. (1978). "Things fearful to name": Sodomy and buggery in seventeenth-century New England. Journal of Social History, 12(2), 268–281. doi:10.1353/jsh/12.2.268
- Perry, M. E. (1989). The "nefarious sin" in early modern Seville. Journal of Homosexuality, 16(1–2), 67–90. doi:10.1300/j082v16n01_04
- Roelens, J. (2024). Citizens and sodomites: Persecution and perception of sodomy in the Southern Low Countries (1400–1700). Brill. doi:10.1163/9789004686175
- Steakley, J. (1989). Sodomy in Enlightenment Prussia: From execution to suicide. Journal of Homosexuality, 16(1–2), 163–175. doi:10.1300/j082v16n01_09
- Upchurch, C. (2021). "Beyond the law": The politics of ending the death penalty for sodomy in Britain. Temple University Press.
- van der Meer, T. (1989). The persecutions of sodomites in eighteenth-century Amsterdam: Changing perceptions of sodomy. Journal of Homosexuality, 16(1–2), 263–307. doi:10.1300/j082v16n01_15

=== Christianity ===
- Bailey, D. S. (1955). Homosexuality and the Western Christian tradition. Longmans, Green.
- Boswell, J. (1980). Christianity, social tolerance, and homosexuality: Gay people in Western Europe from the beginning of the Christian era to the fourteenth century. University of Chicago Press. doi:10.7208/chicago/9780226067148.001.0001
- Goodich, M. (1976). Sodomy in ecclesiastical law and theory. Journal of Homosexuality, 1(4), 427–434. doi:10.1300/j082v01n04_06
- Goodich, M. (1979). The unmentionable vice: Homosexuality in the later medieval period. ABC-Clio.
- Hergemöller, B.-U. (2001). Sodom and Gomorrah: On the everyday reality and persecution of homosexuals in the Middle Ages (J. Phillips, Trans.). Free Association Books.
- Monter, E. W. (1990). Sodomy: The fateful accident. In Frontiers of heresy: The Spanish Inquisition from the Basque lands to Sicily (pp. 276–300). Cambridge University Press. doi:10.1017/cbo9780511523434.014

=== Africa ===
- Cheney, K. (2012). Locating neocolonialism, "tradition," and human rights in Uganda's "gay death penalty". African Studies Review, 55(2), 77–95. doi:10.1353/arw.2012.0031
- Strand, C. (2011). Kill Bill! Ugandan human rights organizations' attempts to influence the media's coverage of the Anti-Homosexuality Bill. Culture, Health & Sexuality, 13(8), 917–931. doi:10.1080/13691058.2011.589080

=== Islamic law, the Middle East and Iran ===
- Adang, C. (2003). Ibn Ḥazm on homosexuality: A case-study of Ẓāhirī legal methodology. Al-Qanṭara, 24(1), 5–31. doi:10.3989/alqantara.2003.v24.i1.172
- Lehtolaakso, H. H. J. (2023). "Killed for the abominable crime of sodomy": Building legitimacy with public executions of sexual and gender minorities in the Islamic State. Critical Studies on Terrorism, 17(1), 44–65. doi:10.1080/17539153.2023.2286712
- Long, S. (2009). Unbearable witness: How Western activists (mis)recognize sexuality in Iran. Contemporary Politics, 15(1), 119–136. doi:10.1080/13569770802698054
- Omar, S. (2012). From semantics to normative law: Perceptions of liwāt (sodomy) and sihāq (tribadism) in Islamic jurisprudence (8th–15th century CE). Islamic Law and Society, 19(3), 222–256. doi:10.1163/156851912x603193
- Rehman, J., & Polymenopoulou, E. (2013). Is green a part of the rainbow? Sharia, homosexuality and LGBT rights in the Muslim world. Fordham International Law Journal, 37(1), 1.
- Rowson, E. K. (2004). Homosexuality ii. In Islamic law. In Encyclopaedia Iranica.

== Children and capital punishment ==
- Beck, E., Britto, S., & Andrews, A. (2007). In the shadow of death: Restorative justice and death row families. Oxford University Press. doi:10.1093/acprof:oso/9780195179415.001.0001
- Beck, E., & Jones, S. J. (2008). Children of the condemned: Grieving the loss of a father to death row. OMEGA – Journal of Death and Dying, 56(2), 191–215. doi:10.2190/om.56.2.d
- Bradley, C. A. (2002). The juvenile death penalty and international law. Duke Law Journal, 52(3), 485–557. JSTOR 1373162
- Bure, K. M. (2017). Coram nobis and State v. Stinney: Why South Carolina should revitalize America's legal "Hail Mary". South Carolina Law Review, 68(5), 917–937.
- Channing, H. (1786). God admonishing his people of their duty, as parents and masters: A sermon, preached at New-London, December 20th, 1786. Occasioned by the execution of Hannah Ocuish, a mulatto girl, aged 12 years and 9 months. For the murder of Eunice Bolles, aged 6 years and 6 months. Evans Early American Imprint Collection.
- Faber, E. (2021). The child in the electric chair: The execution of George Junius Stinney Jr. and the making of a tragedy in the American South. University of South Carolina Press. JSTOR j.ctv19cw9f8
- Fagan, J., & West, V. (2005). The decline of the juvenile death penalty: Scientific evidence of evolving norms. Journal of Criminal Law and Criminology, 95(2), 427.
- Finkel, N. J., Hughes, K. C., Smith, S. F., & Hurabiell, M. L. (1994). Killing kids: The juvenile death penalty and community sentiment. Behavioral Sciences & the Law, 12(1), 5–20. doi:10.1002/bsl.2370120103
- Knell, B. E. F. (1965). Capital punishment: Its administration in relation to juvenile offenders in the nineteenth century and its possible administration in the eighteenth. British Journal of Criminology, 5(2), 198–207. doi:10.1093/oxfordjournals.bjc.a048830
- Sharp, S. F. (2005). Hidden victims: The effects of the death penalty on families of the accused. Rutgers University Press. doi:10.36019/9780813537870
- Steinberg, L., & Scott, E. S. (2003). Less guilty by reason of adolescence: Developmental immaturity, diminished responsibility, and the juvenile death penalty. American Psychologist, 58(12), 1009–1018. doi:10.1037/0003-066x.58.12.1009
- Streib, V. L. (1987). Death penalty for juveniles. Indiana University Press.
- Streib, V. L. (1998). Moratorium on the death penalty for juveniles. Law and Contemporary Problems, 61(4), 55–88. JSTOR 1192429

== Poverty and capital punishment ==
- Allen, H. W., & Clubb, J. M. (2008). Race, class, and the death penalty: Capital punishment in American history. State University of New York Press. doi:10.1515/9780791478349
- Bright, S. B. (1994). Counsel for the poor: The death sentence not for the worst crime but for the worst lawyer. The Yale Law Journal, 103(7), 1835. JSTOR 797015
- Hay, D. (1975). Property, authority and the criminal law. In D. Hay, P. Linebaugh, J. G. Rule, E. P. Thompson, & C. Winslow (Eds.), Albion's fatal tree: Crime and society in eighteenth-century England (pp. 17–63). Allen Lane.
- Hay, D. (1982). War, dearth and theft in the eighteenth century: The record of the English courts. Past & Present, 95(1), 117–160. doi:10.1093/past/95.1.117
- Langbein, J. H. (1983). Albion's fatal flaws. Past & Present, 98(1), 96–120. doi:10.1093/past/98.1.96
- Phillips, S. (2009). Status disparities in the capital of capital punishment. Law & Society Review, 43(4), 807–838. doi:10.1111/j.1540-5893.2009.00389.x
- Rusche, G., & Kirchheimer, O. (1939). Punishment and social structure. Columbia University Press. doi:10.7312/rusc92484
- Thompson, E. P. (1975). Whigs and hunters: The origin of the Black Act. Allen Lane.

== Execution methods ==
- Annas, G. J. (2008). Toxic tinkering — Lethal-injection execution and the Constitution. New England Journal of Medicine, 359(14), 1512–1518. doi:10.1056/nejmhle0804933
- Christianson, S. (2010). The last gasp: The rise and fall of the American gas chamber. University of California Press. doi:10.1525/california/9780520255623.001.0001
- Finks, T. O. (1983). Lethal injection: An uneasy alliance of law and medicine. Journal of Legal Medicine, 4(3), 382–403. doi:10.1080/01947648309513389
- Harmon, T. R., Cassidy, M., & Kloch, R. (2020). Examination of decision making and botched lethal injection executions in Texas. American Behavioral Scientist, 64(12), 1715–1732. doi:10.1177/0002764220956701
- Hengel, M. (1977). Crucifixion: In the ancient world and the folly of the message of the cross (J. Bowden, Trans.). Fortress Press.
- King, P. (2017). Punishing the criminal corpse, 1700–1840: Aggravated forms of the death penalty in England. Palgrave Macmillan. doi:10.1057/978-1-137-51361-8
- Koniaris, L. G., Zimmers, T. A., Lubarsky, D. A., & Sheldon, J. P. (2005). Inadequate anaesthesia in lethal injection for execution. The Lancet, 365(9468), 1412–1414. doi:10.1016/s0140-6736(05)66377-5
- Koniaris, L. G., Sheldon, J. P., & Zimmers, T. A. (2007). Can lethal injection for execution really be "fixed"? The Lancet, 369(9559), 352–353. doi:10.1016/s0140-6736(07)60167-6
- Lain, C. B. (2025). Secrets of the killing state. New York University Press. doi:10.18574/nyu/9781479833009.001.0001
- Martschukat, J. (2002). "The art of killing by electricity": The sublime and the electric chair. The Journal of American History, 89(3), 900. JSTOR 3092345
- Moran, R. (2002). Executioner's current: Thomas Edison, George Westinghouse, and the invention of the electric chair. Alfred A. Knopf.
- Sarat, A., Blumstein, K., Jones, A., Richard, H., Sprung-Keyser, M., & Weaver, R. (2013). Botched executions and the struggle to end capital punishment: A twentieth-century story. Law & Social Inquiry, 38(3), 694–720. doi:10.1111/lsi.12038
- Sarat, A. (2014). Gruesome spectacles: Botched executions and America's death penalty. Stanford University Press. doi:10.1515/9780804791724
- Stolls, M. (1985). Heckler v. Chaney: Judicial and administrative regulation of capital punishment by lethal injection. American Journal of Law & Medicine, 11(2), 251–277. doi:10.1017/s0098858800008704
- Tarlow, S. (2017). The golden and ghoulish age of the gibbet in Britain. Palgrave Macmillan. doi:10.1057/978-1-137-60089-9
- Ward, R. (Ed.). (2015). A global history of execution and the criminal corpse. Palgrave Macmillan. doi:10.1057/9781137444011

== Miscellaneous ==
- Linders, A. (2002). The execution spectacle and state legitimacy: The changing nature of the American execution audience, 1833–1937. Law & Society Review, 36(3), 607–655. JSTOR 1512164
- Morisi, È. (2020). Capital letters: Hugo, Baudelaire, Camus, and the death penalty. Northwestern University Press. JSTOR j.ctvt1sg4m
- Sarat, A. (2001). When the state kills: Capital punishment and the American condition. Princeton University Press. doi:10.1515/9780691188669
- Sharpe, J. A. (1985). "Last dying speeches": Religion, ideology and public execution in seventeenth-century England. Past and Present, 107(1), 144–167. doi:10.1093/past/107.1.144

== See also ==
- Bloody Code
- Capital punishment
- Capital punishment by country
- Capital punishment in Europe
- Capital punishment in the United Kingdom
- Capital punishment in the United States
- Death row
- Executioner
- List of botched executions
- List of methods of capital punishment
- Public execution
- Wrongful execution
