= Secular arm =

The secular arm, in ecclesiastical law, is the legal authority of the civil power, the State, or any lay authority, invoked by the Church to punish offenders in cases properly belonging to the jurisdiction of the Church. This was considered the remedy in cases where excommunication was deemed insufficient and that sterner measures were required to secure obedience to the law.

The secular arm as a means by which lay power intervenes in ecclesiastical cases had two types: sought and unsought by the Church. In the Middle Ages especially in Inquisition trials for heresy, or grave immorality, ecclesiastical courts delivered convicted clerical and lay offenders over to the secular arm to administer severe capital punishments. The phrase "relaxed to the secular arm" was used by the Spanish Inquisition to describe the handover of the condemned heretic. On the other hand, an individual could seek a civil court to interfere - invoking the secular arm - on account of a miscarriage of justice on the part of church authorities.

The medieval Latin phrase 'brachium seculare' was translated first into late Middle English.

== Background ==
Introduced circa 1180–1250 at the time of the Albigensian Crusade, the church inquisitors delivered a Cathar heretic, or any heretic, to the secular arm, to be burnt at the stake. Under canon law church tribunals had no jurisdiction to impose penalties involving mutilation or death. The law, however, provided that the judge of a common law court had the right to invoke the secular arm to address the culpability of an individual, who was a subject to ecclesiastical jurisdiction. Notably the contrary circumstance of appeal by individuals to the secular authorities to interfere with, or hinder, the process of ecclesiastical jurisdiction was until recently punished in the Roman Catholic Church by excommunication.

== Sources ==
Catholic Culture The Oxford Dictionary of Phrase and Fable, Religion
