= Capital punishment for cannabis trafficking =

Several countries have either carried out or legislated capital punishment for cannabis trafficking.

Country	Status	Notes
Saudi Arabia	Has been used	An Iraqi man named Mattar bin Bakhit al-Khazaali was convicted of smuggling hashish in the northern town of Arar, close to the Iraqi border and was executed in 2005.
Indonesia	Has been used	In 1997, the Indonesian government added the death penalty as a punishment for those convicted of drugs in their country. The law has yet to be enforced on any significant, well-established drug dealers. The former Indonesian President, Megawati Sukarnoputri announced Indonesia's intent to implement a fierce war on drugs in 2002. She called for the execution of all drug dealers. "For those who distribute drugs, life sentences and other prison sentences are no longer sufficient," she said. "No sentence is sufficient other than the death sentence." Megawati's successor, Susilo Bambang Yudhoyono, also proudly supported executions for drug dealers.
Malaysia	Has been used	Man sentenced to death by hanging on September 3, 2021, for 299 grams of cannabis presumed to be for trafficking. Mustaffa Kamal Abdul Aziz, 38 years old, and Mohd Radi Abdul Majid, 53 years old, were executed at dawn on January 17, 1996, for the trafficking of 1.2 kilograms of cannabis.
Philippines	No longer imposed: Extrajudicial killings now commonplace	The Philippines abolished the death penalty on June 24, 2006. Previously, the Philippines had introduced stronger anti-drug laws, including the death penalty, in 2002. Possession of over 500 grams of marijuana usually earned execution in the Philippines, as did possessing over ten grams of opium, morphine, heroin, ecstasy, or cocaine. Angeles City is often a Vatican for Filipino cannabis users and cultivators, although enforcement has been inconsistent.
United Arab Emirates	Sentenced	In the United Arab Emirates city of Fujairah, a woman named Lisa Tray was sentenced to death in December 2004, after being found guilty of possessing and dealing hashish. Undercover officers in Fujairah claim they caught Tray with 149 grams of hashish. Her lawyers have appealed the sentence. In July 2012, a 23-year-old British man, Nathaniel Lees, and an unnamed 19-year-old Syrian citizen was sentenced to death for attempting to sell 20 grams (about 3/4 of an ounce) of marijuana to an undercover officer in Dubai. This was later commuted to four years in prison.
Singapore	Frequently used	Death penalty has been carried out many times for cannabis trafficking. In July 2004 a convicted drug trafficker, Raman Selvam Renganathan, who stored 2.7 kilograms of cannabis or marijuana in a Singapore flat, was hanged in Changi Prison. He was sentenced to death on September 1, 2003, after an eight-day trial. In April and May 2023 Singapore hanged 2 citizens for cannabis trafficking. 1 kilogram (2.2 pounds) and 1.5 kilograms (3.3 pounds).
People's Republic of China	Frequently used	A 2011 article points out that the death penalty is exercised regularly for drug tradings under Chinese law, often corresponding to the United Nations' International Day Against Drug Abuse and Illicit Drug Trafficking. The government does not make precise records public, however Amnesty International estimates that around 500 people are executed there each year for drug offenses. Those executed have typically been convicted of smuggling or trafficking in anything from cannabis to methamphetamine.
United States	Never imposed	US federal law allows for the death penalty for those who have extraordinary amounts of the drug (60,000 kilograms or 60,000 plants) or are part of a continuing criminal enterprise in smuggling contraband which nets over $20 million. From a March 2018 article: "This week, U.S. Attorney General Jeff Sessions sent a memo to the nation’s federal prosecutors urging them to seek the death penalty in cases involving large-scale drug traffickers. The memo points to an existing but little-known federal law that already allows for such a punishment. Sessions’ memo talks largely about opioids, but federal law contains no such drug-specific limitation on prosecutors’ power."

== See also ==
- Outline of capital punishment
- Capital punishment for drug trafficking
- Use of capital punishment by country
