= Libertarian perspectives on capital punishment =

Most libertarians oppose capital punishment. They argue that capital punishment is an extreme exertion of state power, it is contrary to the values of a free society, authoritarian countries tend to be retentionist, and liberal-democratic societies generally abolitionist.

Proponents of capital punishment believe that such punishment may be justified as a deterrent to particularly atrocious crimes and as a means of keeping dangerous individuals permanently incapacitated. Furthermore, if people commit crimes, they may sacrifice their rights and if the legal system is legitimate, perhaps capital punishment is justified. The U.S. Libertarian Party, a right-libertarian American third party, opposes "the administration of the death penalty by the state" despite the large stake that conservatives would have in abolishing the death penalty.

There is also the fundamental problem of the possibility of error or even the outright framing of the accused. To that effect, lack of trust in government to make decisions (including life-and-death decisions) competently or for the best motives may confound the issue; already deeply distrustful of government, they say, it should not be trusted to be an arbiter of life and death without error. In any case, to anarcho-capitalists making judges, police officers, and other law enforcement personnel just as responsible for their acts as any citizen, with no privilege or special right or exemption, will prevent abuse of force in general, and of deadly force in particular. Walter Block went so far as to say, "We have seen that in the libertarian philosophy, the death penalty is justified for those whose crimes rise to a sufficient degree of severity. Surely, there are heads of state whose evil deeds many times eclipse such a level. Thus, it would altogether be justified to end their lives by violence."

== See also ==
- Outline of capital punishment
