= Japanese juvenile law =

Children under the age of 15 in Japanese law

Japanese juvenile law (少年法, shōnen hō) was established on July 15, 1948 as Law 168.

== Legal definitions ==
According to Japanese law, the term "shonen" refers to "a person from the time they enter elementary school until the time they are 15 years of age", and "Any person who has not reached the age of 15 years" (Juvenile Law (少年法, Shonen Hō), Article 2.1). In the realm of education and culture, this is the period of compulsory education. While the term "shonen" can refer to both young males and young females, the generally accepted term for young females is shōjo.

The following meanings can also be inferred from "shōnen" (a person under 15 years of age) with regard to juvenile law in Japan:

Hikō shōnen (非行少年)
A youth who has been convicted of a crime or confessed to a crime. Other terms include hanzai shonen, shokuhō shōnen and guhan shōnen, depending on the crime and the age of the perpetrator.

Hanzai shōnen (犯罪少年)
A youth who has committed a crime. (Juvenile Law Article 3.1.1; Juvenile Activities, Police Regulations Article 2.2)
Shokuhō shōnen (触法少年)
A youth under the age of 14 who has committed a crime. (Juvenile Law Article 3.1.2; Juvenile Activities, Police Regulations Article 2.3)
Guhan shōnen (虞犯少年 or ぐ犯少年)
A youth refusing to abide by parental authority, a youth having a lawful reason for not being with his or her family, a youth who is naturally disposed toward criminal activity or who associates with those disposed toward criminal activity, a youth who frequents suspicious locations, a youth with a tendency to injure or assault other people. (Juvenile Law Article 3.1.3; Juvenile Activities, Police Regulations Article 2.4)

Furyōkōi shōnen (不良行為少年)
A youth who does not fall under the descriptions under hikō shonen (above), but who is found drinking alcohol, smoking, being out late at night, or participating in other activities that might harm her or his moral character; basically youth that are being generally delinquent. (Juvenile Activities, Police Regulations Article 2.6)
Higai shōnen (被害少年)
A youth who has committed crimes due to having had a difficult upbringing. (Juvenile Activities, Police Regulations Article 2.7)
Yōhogo shōnen (要保護少年)
A youth who has been the victim of child abuse, in cases where there is no guardianship or guardianship has been deemed necessary for the youth's welfare, and where the youth does not fall under hikō shonen (above). (Juvenile Activities, Police Regulations Article 2.8)

== Usage as a demographic term ==
The term is also used as a demographic term describing media whose target audience consists primarily of adolescent or pre-adolescent boys. Shōnen manga is a popular demographic of Japanese manga, and often features a teenage cast as well as a combat based plot while exploring themes of protecting loved ones, mutual understanding and development of friendship/camaraderie.

== See also ==
- Boy
- Adolescence
- Shōjo
- Bishōnen
- Seinen
- Juvenile delinquency
- Minor (law)
- Reform school

=== Education ===
- Nursery school
- Kindergarten
- Elementary school
- Gymnasium (school)
- Middle school
- High school
