= Peshotanu (punishment) =

Avestan term

A Peshotanu, meaning one who pays with his body, according to Avestan terminology, is a person who had either been condemned to or previously subjected to two hundred stripes with the Aspahe-astra and the Sraosho-karana. Two hundred flogs with a whip was a capital punishment in Ancient Persia next only to death. A Peshotanu was also designated margarzan or "worthy of death".
