= People of Faith Against the Death Penalty =

Religious nonprofit organization

People of Faith Against the Death Penalty (PFADP) is a nonpartisan, nonprofit, interfaith non-governmental organization whose mission and purpose is to educate and mobilize faith communities to act to abolish the death penalty in the United States. It focuses on organizing among faith communities in the South, where most executions take place. It was founded in 1994 in North Carolina.

People of Faith Against Death Penalty is one of 121 member organizations of the World Coalition Against the Death Penalty, whose mission is to strengthen the international dimensions of the fight against the death penalty and, ultimately, to obtain the universal abolition of the death penalty.

A prominent member of PFADP was the late Dean Smith, Basketball Hall of Fame head coach of the University of North Carolina Tar Heels. Smith was part of a 1998 delegation that confronted then-Governor of North Carolina Jim Hunt, with Smith quietly calling Hunt—and everyone else in the room, including Smith—a "murderer" for allowing capital punishment to take place.

== See also ==
- Religion and capital punishment
