= Capital punishment in the Middle East =

Capital punishment is legal in most countries of the Middle East. Much of the motivation for the retention of the death penalty has been religious in nature, as the Qur'an allows or mandates executions for various offences.

== Moratoria and abolition ==
=== Israel ===
Almost all death penalties were abolished by legislation in 1954 except for serious crimes committed during wartime. The last execution to ever take place in Israel was that of Adolf Eichmann, who was convicted for his role in the Holocaust, in 1962.

A moratorium has since been placed on all further execution of any individual.

Legal formalities aside, popular sentiment in favor of the death penalty occasionally rises in Israel in response to particularly heinous crimes. After the Sbarro suicide bombing, right-wing newspapers called for the perpetrators to be executed but Ahlmam Tamimi was only sentenced to prison.

In January 2018, the Knesset made a preliminary vote on a bill introducing death penalty for terrorism. The push to reintroduce capital punishment for terrorism-related murder continued in subsequent Knessets, and on 30 March 2026 the Knesset passed the Penal Bill (Amendment No. 159) (Death Penalty for Terrorists) Law, making death by hanging the default sentence in West Bank military courts for Palestinians convicted of fatal terror attacks. The Association for Civil Rights in Israel (ACRI) petitioned the Supreme Court the same day, arguing the law is unconstitutional and discriminatory.

=== Lebanon ===
On 11 August 2026, the Lebanese parliament voted to abolish the death penalty, thus making it the first Arab nation to do so. A majority of the 128 members of parliament voted in favour of this; the Hezbollah bloc did not. Positive reactions included justice minister Adel Nasser referring to it as a "historic step" and Human Rights Watch researcher Ramzi Kai calling it "a final break from a cruel sentence that should never be imposed."

=== Turkey ===
In Turkey, capital punishment was fully abolished in 2004 for all crimes.

In 2018, Turkish President Recep Tayyip Erdoğan and his right-wing government coalition partners agreed to a proposal that could see the death penalty restored in Turkey against anyone sentenced for terrorism.

== Abolition advocacy ==
=== Attempts ===
In Lebanon in 2008, then-Justice Minister Ibrahim Najjar introduced a draft law to Parliament which would abolish the death penalty. While the law failed to pass, he continued to advocate for the abolition for the rest of his time in office.

Farouk Ksentini, chairman of Algeria's National Advisory Commission for the Protection and Promotion of Human Rights (CNCPPDH), stated in 2010 that he would advocate for the abolition of the death penalty. This aroused opposition from Islamist groups.

=== Places with the death penalty ===
The following, groups, nations, or governments currently enforce the death penalty:

- Libya
- Egypt
- Iraq
- Iraqi Kurdistan
- Kingdom of Saudi Arabia
- Syria
- Gaza
- Palestinian Authority
- Jordan
- Iran
- Qatar
- United Arab Emirates
- Yemen (Hadi and Houthi governments)
- Sultanate of Oman
