= Capital punishment in Sierra Leone =

Capital punishment has been abolished in Sierra Leone. Sierra Leone abolished capital punishment in July 2021 following a decision by the nation's Parliament.

== History ==
Under the 1991 Constitution of Sierra Leone, capital crimes included aggravated robbery, treason, mutiny, and murder. While the nation's final executions were carried out by firing squad, hanging was also a legal method of execution that was apparently more commonly applied for civilian crimes than the firing squad. Two men, Baimba Moi Foray and his bodyguard, Foday Kamara, were sentenced to death by hanging in October 2016 after being convicted of the June 2015 murder of popular Freetown radio DJ Sydney Buckle. After their sentences were handed down, Alfred Paolo Conteh, Sierra Leone's Minister of Internal Affairs at the time, publicly ordered prison staff to clean the gallows at the Freetown Central Prison, believing that publicly advocating for the death penalty would result in a reduction in criminal activity, particularly from gangs, as he communicated in a radio statement: "I have given instructions to the prison officers to clean and ready the tools and machines used to kill people, as reckless killing is on the increase. We have lost a lot of people through reckless killing and ended wasting resources feeding such prisoners for several years. This is unacceptable. . . . It's in the bible, an eye for an eye. Our local people say kill a dog in front of another to know that death is real."

Sierra Leone's last executions took place on 19 October 1998, at the height of the Sierra Leone Civil War. Thirty-four military officers had participated in an attempted coup d'état on May 25, 1997, and were subsequently convicted of treason, which carried the death penalty. The officers were sentenced one week prior to the executions taking place; ten of the officers had their death sentences commuted to life, while the other 24, including one female sergeant, were executed by firing squad after then-President Ahmad Tejan Kabbah refused requests from human rights groups, such as the African Commission on Human and Peoples' Rights, to commute their death sentences. Later, the executions were found to have violated several international human rights treaties and covenants, including the International Covenant on Civil and Political Rights, as well as the African Charter on Human and Peoples' Rights. At the time that the executions took place, human rights groups, such as the Human Rights Watch, condemned the Sierra Leonean government for proceeding with the executions without allowing the executed inmates to appeal their convictions.

== Recent developments ==
Even prior to abolishing the death penalty, Sierra Leone frequently commuted death sentences. Still, in 2020, Amnesty International reported that Sierra Leone had handed down at least 38 death sentences and had a death row population of at least 94 in 2020, over 80 of whom were sentenced after the country carried out its last executions in 1998. AdvocAid, a Sierra Leone-based pro-human rights and anti-death penalty group, worked with the Oxford University Death Penalty Research Unit and the UK Death Penalty Project to publish a memorandum stating that Sierra Leone passed 4 death sentences in 2018 and 21 death sentences in 2019.

Sierra Leonean courts continued passing death sentences until the month that the nation abolished the death penalty, with the nation's last death sentence, that of 24-year-old Musa Kargbo, being passed on 7 July 2021 - weeks prior to the nation's parliament voting to abolish the death penalty - following his conviction of the 9 December 2019 murder of Momoh Kamara.

Death row inmates were housed separately from other prison inmates, a move that death penalty abolitionists labelled "dehumanising."

== Abolition ==
Prior to the administration of President Julius Maada Bio, who took office in April 2018, all three of the preceding administrations had pledged to abolish the death penalty, yet never acted on it.

In May 2021, Justice Minister Umaru Napoleon Koroma announced that the Sierra Leonean government would begin the process of abolishing the death penalty in order to "uphold the fundamental human rights of Sierra Leoneans."

On 23 July 2021, the Parliament of Sierra Leone voted to abolish the death penalty. The change in law officially went into effect after President Julius Maada Bio signed off on the abolition. President Bio praised the parliament's unanimous decision to abolish the death penalty, stating on Twitter, "Today, I have fulfilled a governance pledge to permanently abolish the death penalty in Sierra Leone. I thank citizens, members of Parliament, development partners, and rights groups that have steadfastly stood with us to make history."

Sierra Leone became the 23rd African country, as well as the 110th nation worldwide, to abolish the death penalty. Subsequent to the parliament's ruling and President Bio expressing his intention to sign off on their decision, all 99 of Sierra Leone's death row inmates had their sentences commuted. Capital crimes in Sierra Leone are now to be punished with a minimum sentence of 30 years in prison and a maximum sentence of life imprisonment, although the new law also allows judges to exercise more discretion in deciding on appropriate punishments on a case-by-case basis.
