= Capital punishment in Samoa =

Capital punishment is not a legal penalty in Samoa. The death penalty was used in the colonial era, but the practice had ceased by the time of independence in 1962, with death sentences being commuted to life imprisonment, and it was formally abolished in 2004. The last execution was carried out in 1952.

== Colonial era ==
Following contact with Europeans, colonial powers would sometimes demand execution of Samoans who had wronged them or their citizens. In 1856 a British trader named William Fox was murdered in Sāla‘ilua, Savai‘i. Samoan justice was served when Sāla’ilua reciprocally took the life of a Sāgone noble, but “this was no settlement in European eyes”, and two years later a British warship bombarded Sāgone to force Malietoa Moli to surrender the perpetrator. When he was handed over, he was tried and hanged aboard the British ship.

Under the Condominium established by the Tripartite Convention, the death penalty was imposed for murder by mixed Samoan and European courts.

The death penalty was legal under German colonial rule. The method of execution was hanging. A Samoan named Pupu was hanged at Mulinuu on May 2 1901 by German authorities for murder. Three Chinese men were hanged in November 1913 for the murder of a storekeeper, and this was noted as being the first execution for twelve years. In February 1914 four Samoan constables stole weapons from a jail, shot a German planter, and were finally arrested after a gunfight with police. The survivor was hanged at Vaimea.

Following the occupation of German Samoa in August 1914 and the formation of the Western Samoa Mandate, Samoa came under New Zealand colonial rule. The Samoa Act 1921 provided for the death penalty for the offences of treason and murder, with sentences to be carried out by hanging. When New Zealand temporarily abolished the death penalty for murder from 1941 to 1949, it did not extend abolition to Samoa. Only two executions were carried out under New Zealand rule. In 1928 a Chinese man, Ah Mau, was executed for murder. In 1952 Faasee Faagase was hanged after killing his wife with an axe. No other executions were carried out before independence.

== Post-independence ==
Following independence in 1962 the colonial-era Crimes Ordinance 1961 remained in force, providing for the death penalty as a mandatory punishment for murder and treason. The Criminal Procedure Act 1972 reiterated that the method of execution was by hanging, and updated procedures for execution. Despite this, the death penalty was never carried out, sentences instead being commuted to life imprisonment. Following the assassination of Public Works Minister Luagalau Levaula Kamu in 1999 his killer and the two government ministers who had conspired with him were sentenced to death. All three sentences were subsequently commuted to life imprisonment by O le Ao o le Malo Malietoa Tanumafili II.

In 2003 the rape and murder of a five-year-old girl led to calls for the death penalty to be revived. The calls were opposed by government ministers and the National Council of Churches.

In January 2004 the Samoan government announced plans to abolish the death penalty. It passed the Crimes (Abolition of Death Penalty) Amendment Act less than a week later, formally abolishing the death penalty in law. It has not ratified the Second Optional Protocol to the International Covenant on Civil and Political Rights.
