= 1978 United States Virgin Islands death penalty referendum =

A referendum on the death penalty was held in the United States Virgin Islands on 7 November 1978, in response to a decree by the Governor of the Islands. He requested a non-binding consultative referendum be held in conjunction with the next general election.

== Results ==
Voting Question:

Which of the following statements best represents your view on capital punishment?

- (1) I favor capital punishment for all persons convicted of first degree murder.
- (2) I favor capital punishment only for those persons convicted of first degree murder of a law enforcement officer, or murder committed in the perpetration or attempt to perpetrate rape.
- (3) I oppose capital punishment for any crime.

Choice	Votes	%
Option 1	6,760	41.52
Option 2	2,243	13.78
Option 3	7,280	44.71
Total	16,283	100.00
Valid votes	16,283	74.58
Invalid votes	444	2.03
Blank votes	5,106	23.39
Total votes	21,833	100.00
Source: Direct Democracy
