= Official Table of Drops =

British manual for rope length in hangings

The Official Table of Drops, formerly issued by the British Home Office, is a manual which is used to calculate the appropriate length of rope for long-drop hangings.

Following a series of failed hangings, including those of John Babbacombe Lee, a committee chaired by Henry Bruce, 1st Baron Aberdare was formed in 1886 to discover and report on the most effective manner of hanging. The committee's report was printed in 1888 and recommended a drop energy of 1,260 foot-pounds force (1,710 J). In April 1892, the Home Office revised this based on an energy of 840 foot-pounds force (1,140 J). In practice, however, the hangmen ignored this table and used considerably longer drops. A significantly revised edition of the Official Table of Drops was published in October 1913, allowing 1,000 foot-pounds force (1,400 J) of drop energy – and then from 1939 executioners routinely added nine more inches (23 cm) to the drop in the 1913 table.

The table continued to be used in the United Kingdom until the country suspended capital punishment in 1965, and the UK abolished the death penalty altogether in 1998. The table remains in use in former British colonies that have retained capital punishment by hanging, such as Singapore.

== Other published drop tables ==
- 1947 US "Procedure for Military Executions" handbook.
