= Capital punishment in Abkhazia =

Capital punishment in Abkhazia is not permitted during times of peace. There has been a de facto moratorium on the death penalty in place since 1993.

== History ==
In the early 1990s, the Criminal Code of Georgia allowed the death penalty, but it was completely abolished in 2000 with the signing of protocol 6 of the European Convention on Human Rights.

In 1992, Gia Khachirashvili was sentenced to death for treason by a Georgian court martial in Abkhazia. He was accused of siding with the Abkhazians against the Georgian government in the armed Abkhazia conflict. He was executed in November 1992. This came shortly before Abkhazia maintained its "de facto independence" after the end of the conflict in 1993.

In 2007, Abkhazia adopted "Moratorium on the Death Penalty," a law officially codifying a moratorium of executions during peacetime. A de facto moratorium had been in place since 1993. At the time of the adoption of the new law, there had been two male prisoners on death row.

In 2019, Sokhumi authorities in Abkhazia introduced a plan to lift the moratorium on capital punishment, re-implementing the death penalty as punishment for selling large quantities of drugs or "large scale drug trafficking". At that time, there were only three people serving life sentences in Abkhazia. The change went into effect on March 1, 2020 . However, the capital punishment became "commuted capital punishment"; in other words, a life sentence. A 2025 Supreme Court judgement stated that life imprisonment and the death penalty cannot be imposed when there were mitigating circumstances.

Minors, women, and men over the age of sixty-five cannot be sentenced to capital punishment.

== See also ==
- Ethnic cleansing of Georgians in Abkhazia
- Capital punishment in Georgia (country)
