= Ishikozume =

Ancient method of execution in Japan

Ishikozume (Japanese: 石子詰め) was a ritual method of execution performed in ancient Japan. The ritual is characterized by waist high burial in earth followed by lapidation (death by stoning). It has traditionally been associated with the yamabushi, hermetic practitioners of the Shugendō religion, because they often used it when rules of their religion were violated. However, it has been observed in instances not involving the yamabushi, and so its exact origins and nature has been debated by scholars. This execution method was used for crimes such as "adultery, rape, murder, theft, arson, blasphemy (killing a sacred deer), association with outcastes, [maintaining] unregistered rice fields, [and] treason."

== Sources ==
There exist a variety of sources and traditions which relate the practice. One from Asuka Shrine in Nara claims that a yamabushi stole a stone statue (koma-inu) and was subsequently executed through ishikozume. A clan tradition connected to the Uesugi clan of Echigo Province also states that "rape, theft, and association with eta [outcastes], both men and women, are subject to ishikozume." These sources can be find in a variety of geographical districts, and can be found in shrine, clans, and temple traditions. In rare instances, there will be records of a local variation on the ritual which does not result in death, that is, they are used as corporal rather than capital punishment.

The yamabushi-related sources contain some unique features of their own compared to other categories of ishikozume sources. In the yamabushi ones, the executions are almost always done as public spectacles for which locals are expected to be onlookers. The local yamabushi would put on ritual robes, meet at specified times, and read relevant scriptures beforehand. Finally, the leading priests would carry out the executions.

== Historical research ==
In 1966, the scholar H. Byron Earhart presented competing claims about the issue. He pointed out that archaeological digs of prehistoric Japan has indicated that stones were often found near burial sites. Earhart referred to a Japanese scholar named Ainosuke Fujiwara, who, as early as 1943, went as far as to say that ishikozume should be viewed not as a method of execution, but rather burial. In the end, however, Earhart wrote that the practice's true meaning and nature can never be known for sure, but that he himself speculated that it served both as a means of execution as well as a means of burial, in light of the practice's Buddhist influence and undertones.
