= Callan v Ireland & The Attorney General =

Supreme Court of Ireland case

Noel Callan v Ireland & AG
- Coat of arms of Ireland
- Court: Supreme Court of Ireland
- Full case name: Noel Callan v Ireland and the Attorney General
- Decided: 18 July 2013
- Citation: [2013] 2 ILRM 257; [2013] 2 IR 267; [2013] IESC 35

Case history
- Appealed from: High Court
- Appealed to: Supreme Court

Court membership
- Judges sitting: Denham C.J, Murray J, Hardiman J, McKechnie J, Clarke J

Case opinions
- If a person has been sentenced to imprisonment for over a month, he is, subject to good behavior, eligible for remission under Rule 59(1) of the Prison Rules 2007 and is entitled to greater remission under section 59(2) of same.
- Decision by: Hardiman J, Clarke J
- Concurrence: Denham C.J, Murray J, Mckechnie J

Keywords
- Remission; Commutation of death sentence to Penal Servitude; Prison Rules 2007; Criminal Law Act 1997; Constitution of Ireland 1937; Criminal Law

Callan v Ireland & The Attorney General, [2013] IESC 35; [2013] IR 267; [2013] ILRM 257, was an Irish Supreme Court case which ruled on the decision to commute the sentence of death imposed on Callan to penal servitude for 40 years without allowing for remission. Noel Callan had been sentenced to death in 1985 but had his sentence commuted to 40 years of penal servitude by the President of Ireland, Patrick Hillery. The High Court rejected Callan's appeal that he was eligible for remission. Callan then appealed to the Supreme Court. The Supreme Court found that Callan was indeed serving imprisonment and so by law could request remission of his penalty.

== Background ==
Noel Callan was charged with the capital murder of Garda Sergeant Patrick Morrissey. In 1985 he and the other defendant together was part of a small group of people convicted and sentenced to death for killing on-duty Gardaí. A sentence of death was imposed on him and this sentence was carried out until the President on foot of Article 13 of the Constitution commuted it to Penal Servitude for 40 years. Penal Servitude was abolished in 1997 and changed to imprisonment as per section 11(5) of the Criminal Law Act 1997. Callan took a case arguing that by default of him undergoing a sentence for imprisonment, it entitled him to remission in accordance with the law. He referred to rule 59 of the Prison Rules 2007. The Constitution states that remission is only available in respect of a ''punishment imposed by any court exercising criminal jurisdiction.''

== Facts of the Case ==
Callan was approached by a co-worker, Michael McHugh, who asked him for assistance in robbing the Labour Exchange in Ardee. Both men robbed the Exchange and escaped with the money on a motor bike which they later crashed. In escaping the scene, two shots were fired, the first hitting Morrissey in the leg. McHugh then shot the wounded Morrissey in the head at point-blank range. Callan was a distance away from the shooting however he was charged and convicted of the capital murder of Garda Sergeant Patrick Morrissey in 1985. He was charged on the basis that both men were working as part of a joint enterprise or common purpose. This doctrine holds each party criminally liable for ''all the acts done by the other parties in furtherance of that purpose.'' Callan denied any involvement in either the robbery or the murder of Morrissey. The Special Criminal Court convicted him of capital murder and his conviction was upheld by the Court of Criminal Appeal.

== The High Court ==
The case originated in the High Court (Ireland) in 2011, which dismissed Callan's arguments. Hanna J held that he cannot avail of remission because he was not serving a sentence of imprisonment. In addition he was not entitled to remission under the Prison Rules because his sentence resulted from an order by the President rather than a sentence imposed by the court. The Court held that the power to commute a sentence is an executive power. The Court further held that Callan had not been subjected to unequal treatment or discrimination based on the difference in remission entitlements. Hanna J rejected all of the various constitutional arguments brought forward by the appellant counsel and found in favour of the defendants.

== Supreme Court ==
The State argued the Callan was not entitled to remission for good behavior because he was serving a "commutation" rather than a sentence. However, the Supreme Court rejected this argument. Hardiman stated, "I believe that, in terms of logic, law and language, this is a nonsense." The Court noted that the 1997 law removing "penal servitude" stated that anyone in jail for it should be considered to be serving a "sentence of imprisonment." Furthermore, the court noted that Callan had been convicted of murder through the doctrine of common purpose. Yet the justices pointed out that a plausible defense for Callan was that the common purpose extended to the robbery but not the murder of Morrissey. The court ruled that Callan was eligible for remission based on good behavior.

== Conclusion ==
This case is interesting as it shows the Supreme Court reversing the decision of the High Court. In allowing the appeal, the Supreme Court enabled Callan to be entitled to remission of one quarter of his sentence and perhaps even more in accordance with the law.

== Subsequent developments ==
One case which made reference to Callan was McKevitt v Minister for Justice and Equality & Others. Kelly J in this case observed the construction of Rule 59 (2) with specific reference made to the observations of Clarke J in the Supreme Court in Callan. Kelly J agreed with the judgment in Callan that Rule 59 (2) confers a discretionary power on the Minister in relation to granting a greater remission. Another case which made reference to Callan was Byrne (A Minor) v Director of Oberstown School. In this case Hogan J. held that the case of Callan v Ireland & The Attorney General applied when speaking about the importance of remission in relation to the role it plays in the operation of the criminal justice system.

== See also ==
- Supreme Court of Ireland
- Penal labour
- High Court (Ireland)
