= Patibular fork =

Gallows of columns of stone that rested on a horizontal beam of wood

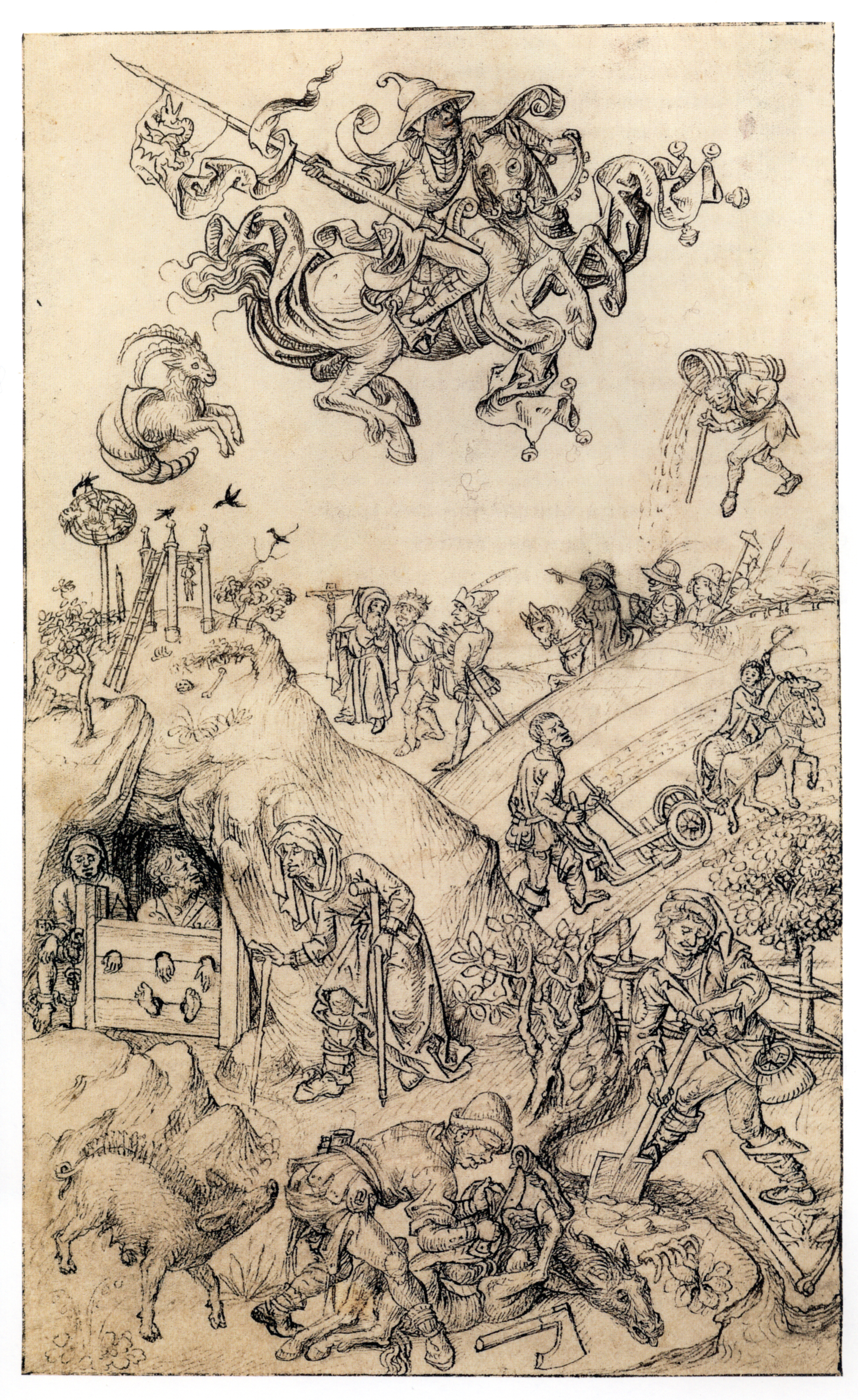
Patibular forks on a hill, after 1480.

A patibular fork was type of gallows consisting of two or more columns of stone, with a horizontal beam of wood resting on top. Placed high and visible from the main public thoroughfare, it signaled the seat of high justice, with the number of stone columns indicating the holder's title.

Those condemned to death were hanged from the wooden beam, their bodies left on the gallows for passersby to see and for crows to devour.

Although sometimes used in the singular, the term "patibular forks" is usually written in the plural.

== Etymology ==
From the Latin patibulum ("cross", "gallows" or "pole").

The origin of the term comes from the forks used by the Romans to punish slaves. After stripping the slaves of their clothes, the slaves' had their head passed through a fork and their bodies were fastened to the same piece of wood to be beaten with sticks.

Patibular forks should not be confused with patibular ladders or patibular marks.

== History ==
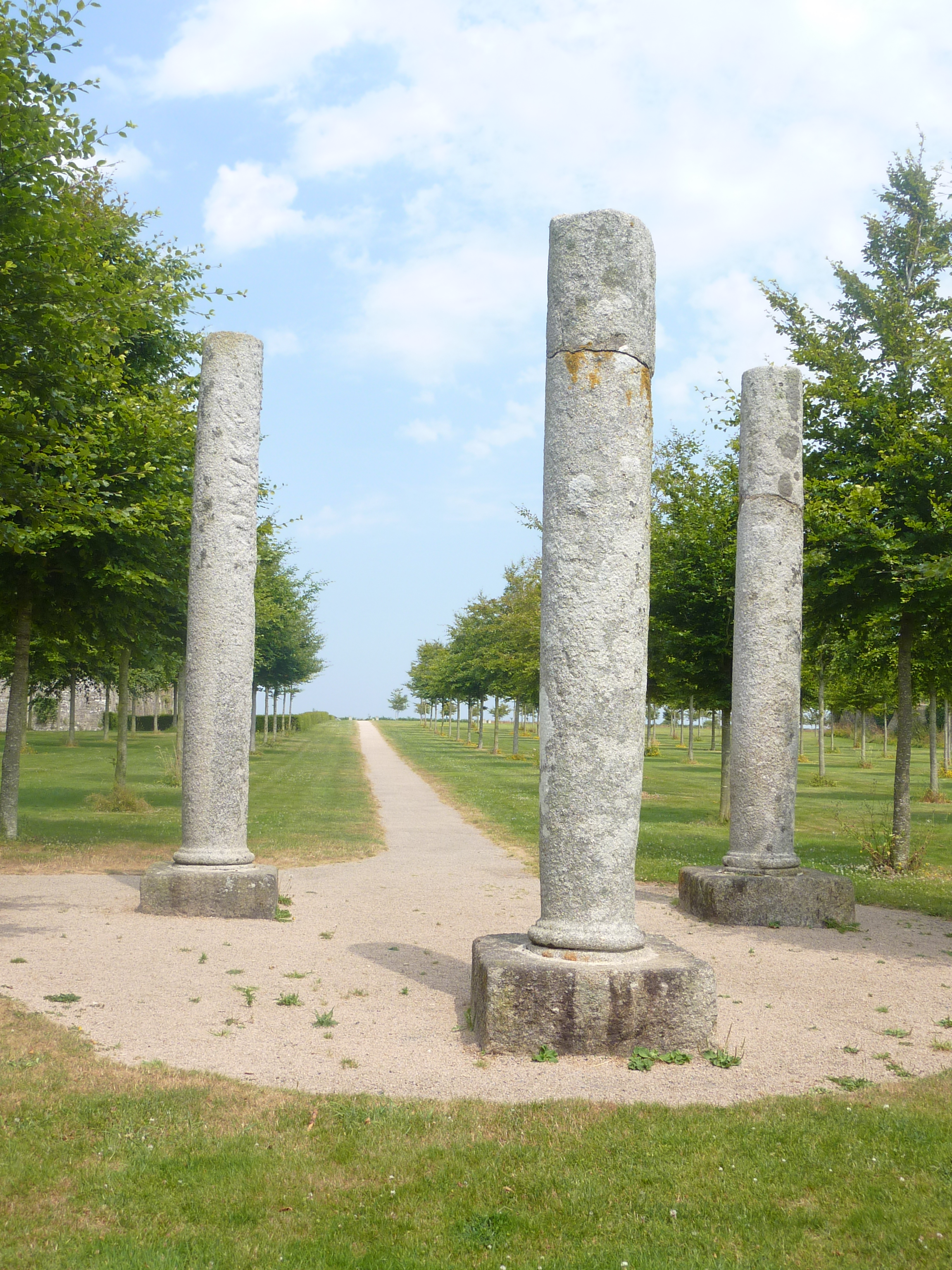
The justice pillars (patibular forks) of Château de Kerjean (Finistère).

Patibular forks first appeared at the beginning of the 12th century. In Touraine, ecclesiastical records and documents attest to their presence since the 13th century. The most famous was that of the Provost of Paris: the Gibbet of Montfaucon, at the Porte de Paris (northeast of the city, near the present Place du Colonel-Fabien). The gallows were installed under Philip the Fair at the instigation of his minister and advisor, Enguerrand de Marigny, who was hanged there himself after Philip the Fair's death.

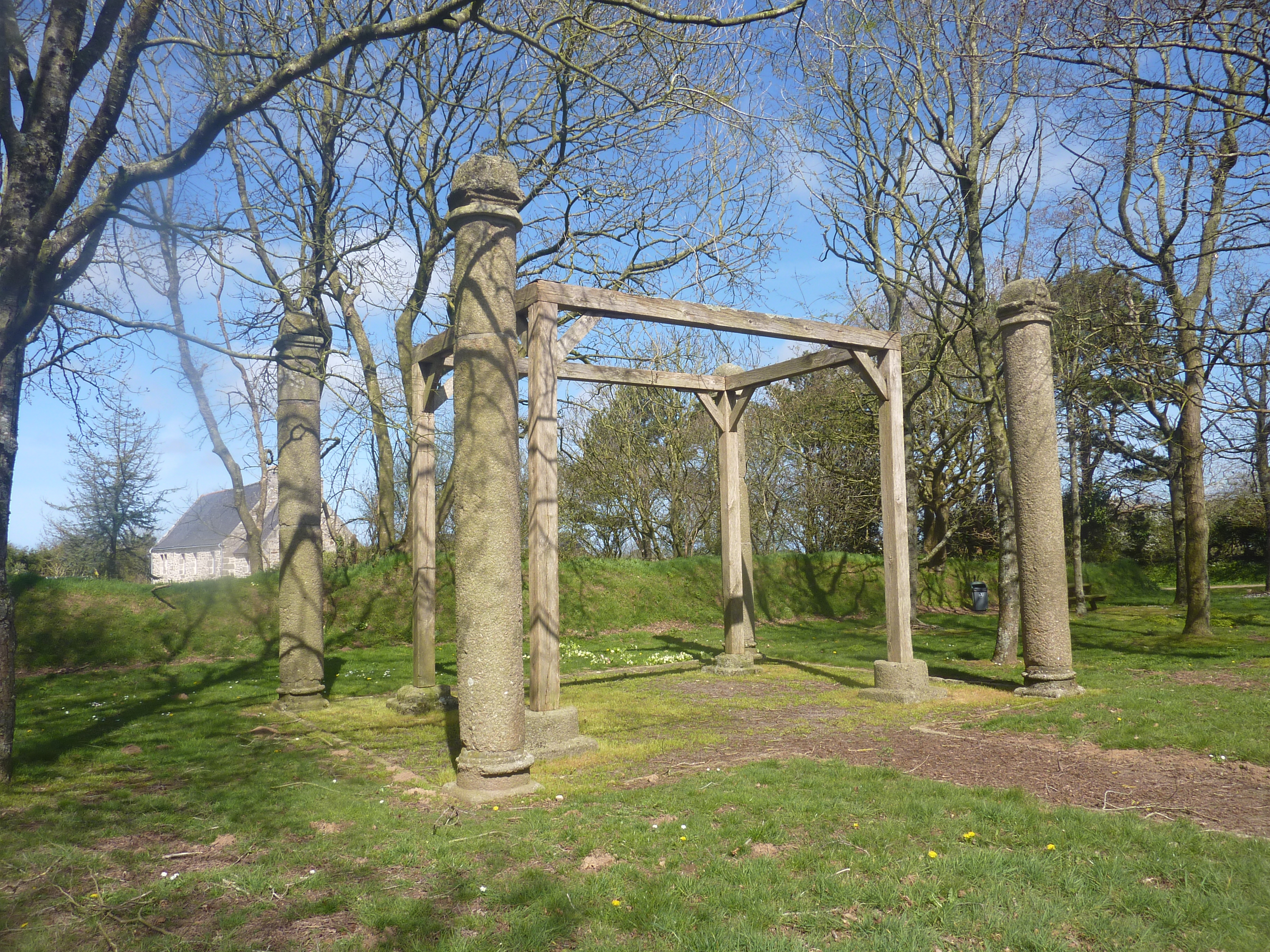
The justice columns at Kergroadez in Plourin (Finistère).

Patibular forks were generally placed on high ground outside cities, towns, and villages, usually near a main road and in a place where travellers could see them, to inspire the horror of the crime.

Despite the macabre nature of these constructions and the foul smell they emitted, cabarets were often established in the vicinity of the gallows, as hangings were a popular spectacle in the Middle Ages (remains of a cabaret in Creuë).

=== Justice levels ===
In principle, high justiciars were required to have patibular forks "both as a sign and token of their high justice and for the execution thereof".

But an older treatise, the Grand Coutumier de France, states that "many high justiciars do not have forks, but for this reason, the right of their justice cannot be weakened" and even that "those who have average justice have the power to hang without dragging, and can only have forks with two pillars whose links are dedicated".

=== Number of pillars ===
Only the king could have as many as he wished. In principle, dukes had eight, counts six, barons four, chatelains three, and simple high justiciars two. There were, however, many exceptions to this general rule, and these varied, for example, according to the customary law of the various provinces and the history of each seigneury:

- In 1496, Charles VIII allowed the "dean and chappitre of the church of Angiers", high justiciars in their seigneury of Plexis-au-Gramaire, to rebuild their four-pillared patibular forks there.
- In 1696, when Louis Auguste, Duke of Maine, made the land of the Garnerans a county, he allowed the Count to rebuild the four-pillared patibular forks.
- In 1719, when he made Cons-la-Grandville a marquisate with high justice, the Duc de Bar granted him only four-pillar patibular forks.
- In an edition of 1762, the Traité des fiefs sur la Coutume de Poitou (Treaty of Fiefs on the Coutume of Poitou) stipulates that counts, viscounts, or barons may have and hold four-pillar patibular forks.
- In an attempt at a synthesis, the Traité des justices de seigneur et des droits en dépendants (Treaty of the Justices of the Lord and the Rights depending on them - 1764) mentions that "most of the Coutume which mention the rights attributed to the Lord of a land erected into a County, give him the right to have a six-pillar patibular justice [...] although other Coutume decides that the Count's patibular justice should have only four pillars". However, when the title of the seigniory evolves, the number of authorized pillars tends to remain unchanged: "[...] Pillars; according to their titles and immemorial possession. And for this purpose, there is no need to innovate or research anything, but to leave things as they are, to avoid endless litigation".

The High Justice must obtain the King's authorization to erect new patibular forks, or to rebuild them if they have been down or destroyed for more than a year and a day.

== Principle ==
According to the thesis of Anne Lafran, cited by Cécile Voyer of the Centre d'études supérieures de civilisation médiévale (Center of Advanced Studies in Medieval Civilization), the hanging and disembowelment (by corvus) recall the death of Judas.

Matthew's Gospel evokes suicide by hanging, while Luke's refers disembowelment. Both versions appear in the literature of the twelfth century.

According to a study of the Paris forks, the bodies of the executed were removed as late as possible, even if this meant rehanging body parts that had fallen off. Indeed, forks lose their raison d'être as soon as they were no longer in use.

According to Vincent Chalet of the Centre d'études médiévales de Montpellier "Montpellier Medieval Studies Center", on the one hand, patibular forks were used, perhaps not often, but in any case not merely symbolically; on the other hand, they were intended to punish outsiders (vagrants, adventurers, rivals, etc.), unlike pillories, which were intended to punish insiders.

== Locations ==
- Château de Kerjean (Finistère)
- Gibbet of Montfaucon
- Plourin (Finistère)
- Gibet of Creuë
- The Mount of Forks in Vitry-en-Perthois

== See also ==
- Court leet
- Hanging
- Pillory
