= Capital punishment in Rwanda =

Capital punishment is no longer a legal punishment in Rwanda. The death penalty was abolished in the country in 2007.

== Pre-genocide capital punishment ==
Prior to the Rwandan genocide, the final death sentences in Rwanda were carried out in 1982. Reportedly, 43 "common" prisoners were executed in September 1982, the last time non-political prisoners would be executed in Rwanda. Until Rwanda's final executions in 1998, the United Nations considered Rwanda to be de facto abolitionist - retentionist in law but abolitionist in practice - because although they retained the death penalty, they did not use it often; in addition, in 1992, the then-president of Rwanda issued a series of death sentence commutations.

== Final executions ==
Rwanda's final executions took place on 24 April 1998, when 22 people convicted of involvement in the Rwandan genocide were publicly executed by firing squad, including politician Froduald Karamira. Four of the executions, including that of Karamira, took place in the capital city of Kigali; the other 18 took place in other locations across the country. Karamira, Silas Munyagishali, Elie Nhimiyimana, and Virginie Mukankusi were executed in Kigali; Deogratias Bizimana, Egide Gatanazi, Maximilien Habimana, and William Libanje were executed in Kibungo; Faustin Niyonzima, Jean Habimana, Ignace Nsengiyuma, Augustin Ngendahayo, and Venuste Niyonzima were executed in Gikongoro; Gabriel Wachawaseme, Nekisolom Hatizange, Anatase Muhunawange, Segeree Mugiraga, and Pyani Nahayo were executed in Nyamata; François Bizumutima, Methusalem Bakizande, Augustin Karekezi, and Abdou Nsengiyumva were executed in Murambi. Less than a month after the executions, 2,000 genocide suspects confessed to avoid possible death sentences themselves.

Originally, tribunals that took place between late 1996 and early 1998 sentenced over 130 people to death for their involvement in perpetrating the Rwandan genocide. Of those, 33 people involved were scheduled for execution on 24 April in Kigali, but for an unknown reason, only 22 of the executions were carried out. Some of those executed did not have defence attorneys, and several prospective defence witnesses were intimidated out of testifying. Public sentiment was in favour of the executions; however, human rights organizations condemned the executions.

== Final death sentences ==
Approximately 18 people were sentenced to death in Rwanda in 2003, and all were convicted of crimes related to their involvement in the Rwandan genocide; there were a total of 450 people put on trial in 2003 for genocide-related crimes, many of whom were convicted during a mass trial. Those who were convicted but not sentenced to death had sentences ranging from 1–25 years to life imprisonment; there were at least 37 acquittals as well.

Although Amnesty International reported that the genocide-related death sentences were the last that Rwanda handed down prior to abolition, there were reports of more death sentences being handed down in February 2004. At least five men were reportedly condemned to die for the 26 November 2003 murders of at least two Rwandan genocide survivors who were set to testify in the Gacaca courts, including Charles Rutinduka and Emile Ntahimana.

Between the final executions in 1998 and the abolition of capital punishment in July 2007, Rwandan courts handed down 1,365 death sentences.

== Abolition ==
In February 2007, Rwanda announced its intentions to no longer apply the death penalty. In June 2007, Rwandan MPs voted to remove the death penalty as an applicable sentence. A significant part of their motivation was rooted in the Rwandan government's desire to have fugitive suspects in the Rwandan genocide extradited so they could be tried in Rwanda rather than in other abolitionist countries. Some countries that do not have the death penalty, including the European, North American, and West African countries where the suspects were believed to have fled, refuse to extradite people to countries that utilize torture and capital punishment in fears that those extradited people will be tortured or executed upon their return. Stephen Rapp, a prosecutor in the Special Court for Sierra Leone and a former senior trial attorney at the International Criminal Tribunal for Rwanda, stated that Rwandan genocide suspects were being tried in courts in Arusha, Tanzania, because they stood no chance of being sentenced to death there, but that Rwanda abolishing the death penalty made it possible to extradite those suspects from Tanzania to Rwanda because "we could not send people [to Rwanda] knowing that they would face [the] death penalty."

On 25 July 2007, Rwandan legislators announced the abolition of the death penalty with the publication of the Organic Law Relating to the Abolition of the Death Penalty. The law provided for people convicted of capital crimes to instead be subjected to life imprisonment; those convicted of specifically heinous capital crimes, including genocide-related crimes, would be subjected to life imprisonment with "special provisions," including solitary confinement and no chance of parole until serving at least 20 years. The abolition of the death penalty resulted in approximately 1,365 death row inmates having their sentences commuted.

Rwanda was the first country in the African Great Lakes region to abolish capital punishment. Rwanda was also the 100th country worldwide to abolish the death penalty.

Rwanda's decision to abolish the death penalty invited praise from human rights organizations. Louise Arbour, the United Nations High Commissioner for Human Rights, called Rwanda's death penalty abolition "a powerful endorsement of the importance of pursuing justice while repudiating violence in all its forms. . . . With the promulgation of the law banning the death penalty, Rwanda simultaneously takes an important step forward in ensuring respect for the right to life and makes further progress in bringing to justice those responsible for the heinous crimes of the 1994 genocide." Arbour's statement also acknowledged that the abolition would promote other countries to extradite suspects in the Rwandan genocide so that they could face Rwandan courts.

After abolishing the death penalty, Rwandan President Paul Kagame received the "Abolitionist of the Year 2007" award from Hands Off Cain, a global anti-death penalty group. During the award ceremony, Kagame announced his support for a universal moratorium of capital punishment in all countries, stating, "Rwanda will be happy to work together with other African countries, and to join the European Union in co-sponsoring the resolution at the upcoming United Nations General Assembly, in support of this important initiative."
