= Capital punishment in Gabon =

Capital punishment in Gabon was officially abolished for all crimes in 2010. Gabon's last execution took place in 1985. Prior to abolition, Gabon was classified as an "abolitionist-in-practice" due to the length of time since its last execution.

== History ==
=== Last execution ===
Gabon's last execution took place at dawn on 11 August 1985, when Alexandre Mandja Ngokouta was put to death. Ngokouta, a captain in the Gabonese Air Force who joined a sociopolitical religious group associated with the Celestial Church of Christ that was concerned with the unrest generated by a recent economic crisis, attempted to stage a coup d'état against Gabon's president Omar Bongo. Ngokouta's coup attempt was ultimately unsuccessful, as the French secret service thwarted the attempt. Ngokouta was arrested and convicted by a court-martial of attempting to overthrow the government; the verdict was announced in early August 1985. He was promptly executed by firing squad in Libreville, approximately one week after his conviction. Two of his alleged accomplices were sentenced to a lifetime of imprisonment and hard labor. One was sentenced to five years in prison. Two were acquitted. Overall, six military men were accused of involvement in the coup attempt. The last execution in Gabon was the first and only execution for treason during Bongo's administration.

== Abolition ==
Prior to abolition, Gabon had an ongoing moratorium on executions since Ngokouta's death in 1985. On 13 September 2007, Gabon's Council of Ministers voted to ban the death penalty, a decision which garnered praise from the United Nations High Commissioner for Human Rights, Louise Arbour, who released a statement declaring, "This decision reinforces the growing movement towards the abolition of the death penalty worldwide." At the time, Arbour invited Gabon to consider becoming a party to the Second Optional Protocol to the International Covenant on Civil and Political Rights (ICCPR), which commits its signatories to completely abolishing the death penalty within their borders.

In 2007, Gabon was also the official presenting country of the United Nations resolution for a moratorium on the death penalty.

Just under three years later, on 15 February 2010, Gabon, under the government of new president Ali Bongo Ondimba, put the death penalty up for vote before their parliament, resulting in the country formally and completely removing capital punishment from their legislation. They did not publicly announce their abolition of the death penalty until 14 February 2011, when they made an official announcement through anti-death penalty group Hands Off Cain. Gabon's abolition made them the 96th country in the world, and the 16th in Africa, to abolish capital punishment. Gabon's decision to abolish the death penalty was largely met with praise, with the Secretary of Hands Off Cain, Sergio D'Elia, calling the move part of Gabon's "enormous progress regarding human rights," while the president of the International Federation for Human Rights, Souhayr Belhassen, heralded the decision as one that opened up the opportunity for more humanitarian progress in other retentionist African countries, such as Mali and Benin.

The death penalty was replaced with a maximum punishment of life imprisonment. Under Gabonese law, those convicted of crimes formerly punishable by death are required to spend at least 30 years in prison before release or parole eligibility. The abolition of the death penalty was also accompanied with the abolition of forced penal labor as a punishment in the military code.

Gabon acceded to the Second Optional Protocol to the International Covenant on Civil and Political Rights on 2 April 2014.
