= Machhi Singh case =

The Machhi Singh case was a series of family disputes that escalated into violence in Punjab, India. In all, 17 people from various families were killed in the violence. The deaths led to a criminal case—Machhi Singh And Others vs State Of Punjab—which resulted in legal precedent being set on when the death penalty should be applied in Indian courts.

== History ==
On the night of 12 August 1977, a series of attacks took place in and around five villages in Punjab, India. The attacks were organized and perpetrated by Machhi Singh, a local man who was in a feud with another man, Amar Singh, and his sister Piaro Bai. The victims of the attacks were all part of Amar and Piaro's family, while the perpetrators were all affiliated with Machhi Singh. In all, 17 people were killed, after which Machhi Singh and some of his close relations were arrested.

Following the arrest of Machhi Singh, he and several other men who had participated in the attacks were put on trial for murder and for breaching law and order. Arrests continued, and in all 11 of Singh's affiliates (many of whom were close relatives) were put on trial for various crimes. 5 sessions of cases were held, all with Machhi Singh named as the primary defendant. By the end of the first round of legal proceedings in 1980, 9 men had been sentenced to life in prison, while Machhi Singh and three others were sentenced to death.

Upon being sentenced to death, the convicts made a total of fourteen appeals before the High Court of Punjab and Haryana. These appeals were rejected by the court, and thus the death penalty sentences were upheld. Undeterred, Singh and the three other men asked for special leave to have their requests for an appeal heard before the Indian Supreme Court. This was accepted, and the court began the appeal process for Machhi Singh And Others vs State Of Punjab in 1983. The court's verdict was that the death penalty sentence should not be overturned as, though the crimes had been committed to settle a dispute, said crimes had been violent, destructive, and egregious enough to warrant the death penalty. In making this verdict, this established the legal test that the death penalty should be reserved for the "rarest of rare" cases in which the manner of commission or the motive behind the crime were unusually cruel.

In the aftermath of the case, the "rarest of rare" legal precedent created by the case became the standard guideline for Indian courts entertaining the issuing of the death penalty.
