= Theatre of Horror =

1985 book by Richard van Dülmen

- Author: Richard van Dülmen
- Original title: Theater des Schreckens
- Translator: Elisabeth Neu
- Language: German
- Genre: Non-fiction
- Publisher: C. H. Beck, Polity Press
- Publication date: 1985
- Publication place: Germany
- English publication date: 1990
- Pages: 189
- ISBN: 9780745606163 (Note: Polity Press edition)
- Dewey Decimal: 345.43009
- LC Class: KK754 .D8513 1991

Theatre of Horror: Crime and Punishment in Early Modern Germany (Note: German: Theater des Schreckens: Gerichtspraxis und Strafrituale in der frühen Neuzeit) is a 1985 non-fiction book by German historian Richard van Dülmen, first published by C. H. Beck and translated into English by Elisabeth Neu in 1990. It covers the process of a trial from arrest to execution in Germany in the early modern period, including how the rituals involved and crime & punishment statistics changed between the 16th and 18th centuries. It was the first overview of its kind to be published in English, and received generally positive reviews as an introduction to the topic for non-German scholars.

== Synopsis ==
Theatre of Horror examines the history of punishments for crimes in early modern Germany, a time period between the 16th and 18th centuries. Nuremberg and Frankfurt were the main cities examined, as they were believed to be generally representative of Europe; these cities are compared with ones in England at similar times. The book is organized chronologically, following the path of a criminal from their arrest, through the trial and sentencing, and then to the execution. It also covers the treatment of the accused and the public process of their procession to the scaffold, the potential reactions of the crowds to the act, and the various non-lethal punishments and different methods of execution. In addition to the narrative of the condemned criminal, it also compares execution statistics at different times across Europe for various crimes. The English translation also included an index.

The other main part of the book is explaining how the surrounding social norms for these executions changed between the 16th and 18th centuries, covered within each chapter. Trials and punishments had already become private in Germany in the 16th century, following the criminal code present issued by Charles V in 1532, the Constitutio Criminalis Carolina. Even though trials (with torture used for confessions) were now private, the public parts of the execution such as the reading of the sentencing and the punishment itself were more prominent, in order to show that justice was being done. They also served as a reminder of the power of the state to peasants.

Van Dülmen use the term "theatre of horror" to refer to the rituals around the execution, rather than the use of public execution itself. Originally, punishments were designed to mirror the crimes of the accused, but over time execution by simply beheading became more common as authorities became unhappy with how the public interpreted the rituals surrounding the execution. Crowds could interfere, often becoming angry and assualting and sometimes even killing executioners who failed at their jobs or caused unnecessary pain. The "golden age" of public executions in Frankfurt was between 1562 and 1600, when over 1/3 of all crimes were punished by death, which fell below 10% by the end of the 17th century.

== Publication history ==
The book was first published in Germany by C. H. Beck in 1985. The author, Richard van Dülmen, was a history professor at the University of Saarland. It was translated into English by Elisabeth Neu, published in 1990 by Polity Press in the United Kingdom and by Basil Blackwell in 1991 in the United States. It was the first of van Dülmen's books to be translated into English.

== Reception ==
Theatre of Horror received generally positive reviews from critics. It was commonly regarded as a well written overview of and introduction to the subject matter. In particular the English translation was valued as very few books analyzing German sources had been published in English, with Peter Burke writing that, although the book itself may not have been the most novel research, it served as a good summary for the English-speaking world. John Theibault wrote that the best of the book was explaining the differing motivations beyond all parties involved in an execution, but thought that it did not adequately explain why their attendance was so popular from the public. Elisabeth Cawthon praised the book for explaining the legal reasons for the obscure and violent practices in the ceremonies of execution, as well as recreating how a trial looked in an understandable way from primary-source documents.

Neu's translation was well received by Michael MacDonald and Christopher Friedrichs, but Theibault found the translation to be awkward, especially regarding translation of idioms. The bibliography was criticized for being lacking on recent advancements in English-language literature, while MacDonald was generally negative towards van Dülmen's analysis of the events, instead recommending it for the more base-level descriptions of the mechanics of executions in Germany.
