= Scaffold (execution site) =

Raised platform for public executions

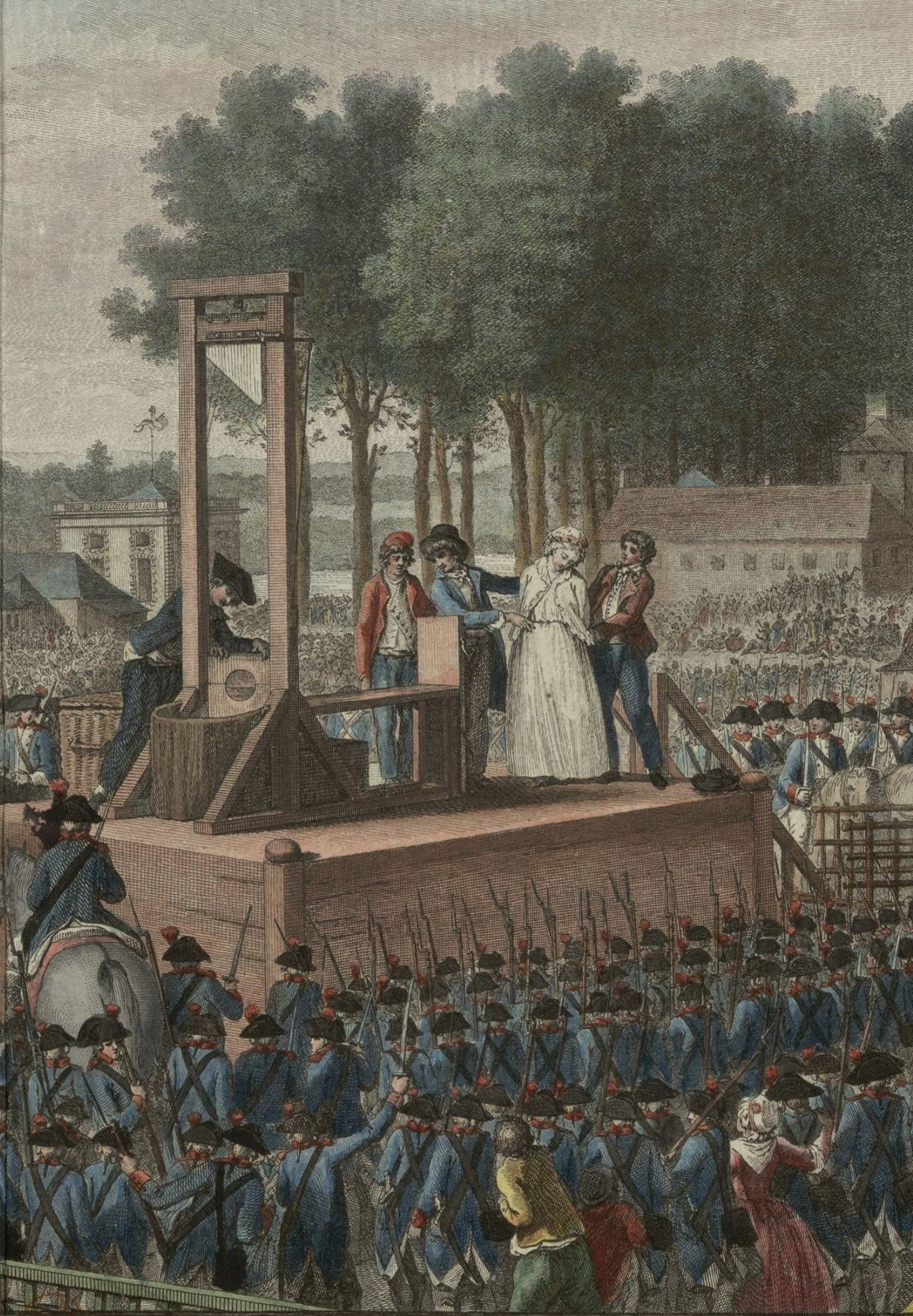
Marie Antoinette before her execution on the scaffold.

A scaffold (French: échafaud, German: Schafott) is a raised, stage-like site for performing public executions.

The execution was practised in public places. The "public spectacle" character of the execution was meant to deter the people from committing crimes, and demonstrate the authority of the Government, while simultaneously acting as a form of entertainment for the masses. For this purpose, the scaffold was often higher than a podium setup, and was therefore also called scaffold.
