= Relaxado en persona =

Euphemism for burnt at the stake

Relaxado en persona (modern spelling: relajado en persona) was a Spanish legal phrase, literally meaning "relaxed in person", meaning "transferred to the secular authorities", a euphemism for "burnt at the stake" in the records of the Spanish Inquisition, since the church tribunal could not execute death sentences. The majority of those "relaxed in person" from 1484 onwards were relapsos (relapsed Jews or Muslims) or herejes (heretics, but also often Jews and Muslims). Use of the term in source material continues until 1659 or later.

Examples:

- Alvaro de Segovia.. hereje judio relaxado en persona á 13 Setiembre 1485.
- Violante de Calatayud, muger de Francisco Clemente, heretico Judio, relaxado en persona en 18. de Março 1486'.
- herege Judaizante Relapso Relaxado en Persona año de 1659.

The noun form is relajación en persona (literally "relaxation in person"), but the noun form is primarily used by historians rather than contemporaries. Historians may also use the term anachronistically, for example as in the case of the last burning in Peru, that of Mariana de Castro, Lima, 1732.
