= Capital punishment in Israel =

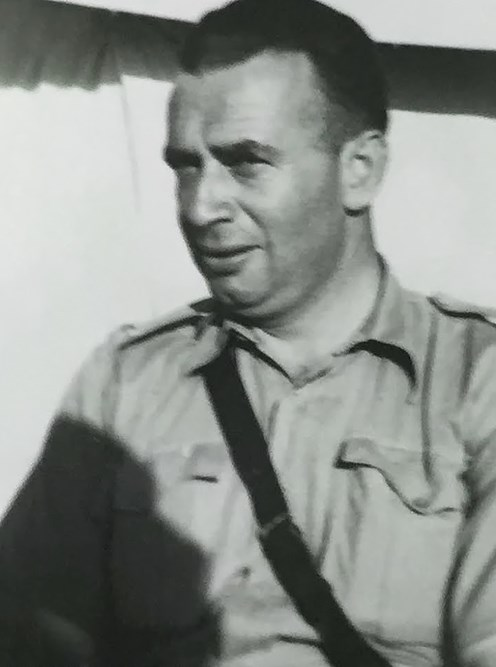
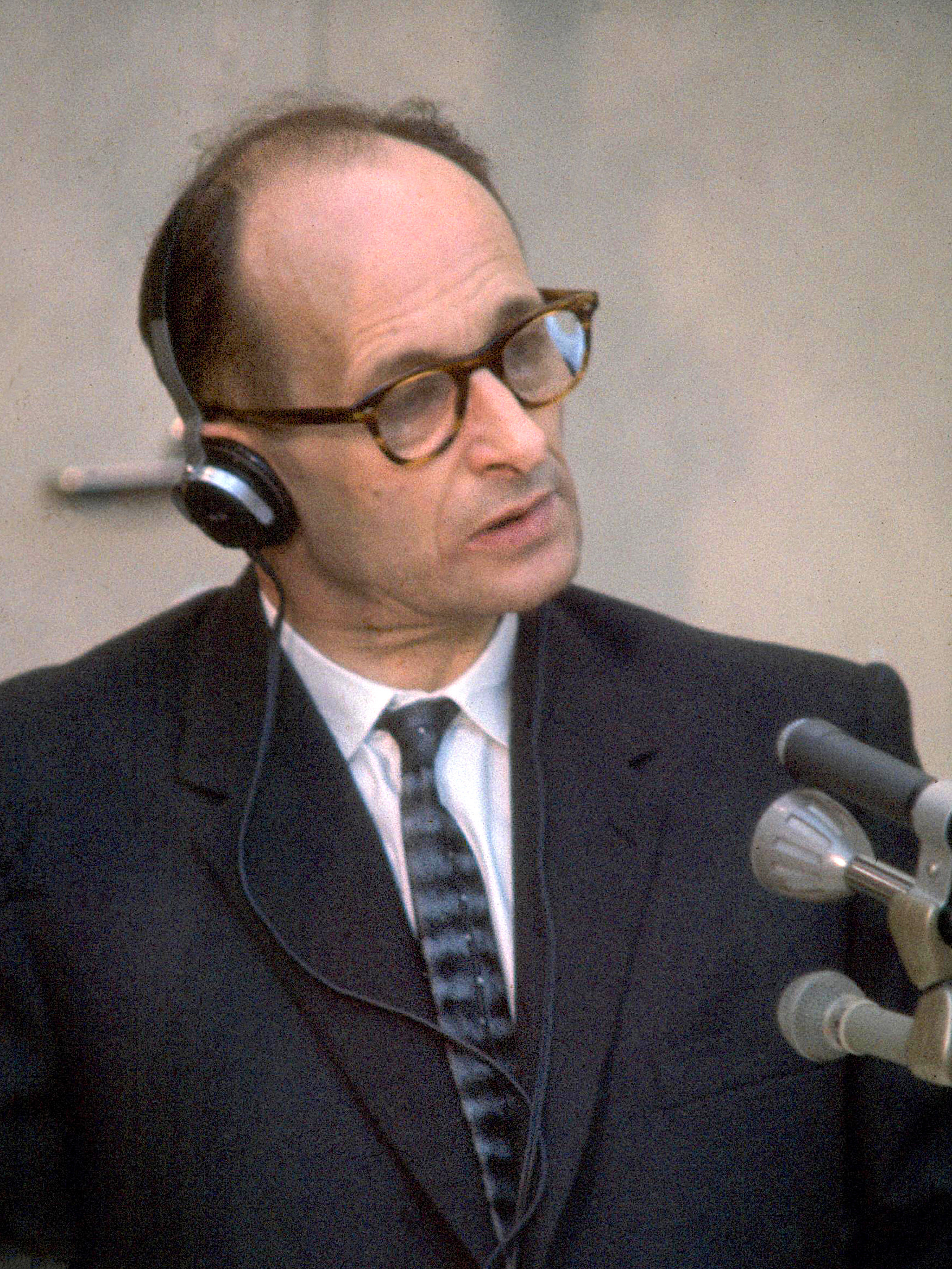
Meir Tobianski and Adolf Eichmann, the only two people to have been executed in Israel to date

Israel is one of seven countries to have abolished capital punishment for "ordinary crimes only." Capital punishment has only been imposed twice in the history of the state and is only to be handed out for treason, genocide, crimes against humanity, and crimes against the Jewish people during wartime.

Israel inherited the Mandatory Palestine code of law, which included capital punishment for several crimes, but in 1954, Israel abolished the penalty for murder. The only execution in the history of the State of Israel was carried out in 1962, when Holocaust architect Adolf Eichmann was hanged for genocide and crimes against humanity. The last death sentence in Israel was handed down in 1988, when John Demjanjuk was sentenced to death for war crimes and crimes against humanity; his sentence (and conviction) was subsequently overturned in 1993 following an appeal to the Israeli Supreme Court. No death sentences have been sought by Israeli prosecutors since the 1990s.

As of 2023, the only crimes that are capital crimes in Israel are for crimes against humanity, treason, and terrorism.

Since 2026, the death penalty is the default punishment for Palestinians who have carried out fatal attacks deemed as terrorism.

The President of the State of Israel has, under the authority of the Basic Laws of Israel (specifically, Basic Law: The President of the State) the ability to pardon or commute a death sentence.

== History ==
Israel's rare use of the death penalty may in part be due to Jewish religious law. Biblical law explicitly mandates the death penalty for 36 offenses, from murder and adultery to idolatry and desecration of the Sabbath. However, in ancient Israel, the death penalty was rarely carried out. Jewish scholars since the beginning of the common era have developed such restrictive rules to prevent execution of the innocent that the death penalty has become de facto abolished. Moses Maimonides argued that executing a defendant on anything less than absolute certainty would lead to a slippery slope of decreasing burdens of proof, until we would be convicting merely "according to the judge's caprice". His concern was maintaining popular respect for law, and he saw errors of commission as much more threatening than errors of omission. Conservative Jewish religious leaders and scholars believe that the death penalty should remain unused, even in extreme cases such as political assassination.

When the modern state of Israel was established in 1948, it inherited the British Mandate's legal code, with a few adjustments, and thus capital punishment remained on the books. During the 1948 Arab–Israeli War, the first execution took place after Meir Tobianski, an Israeli army officer, was falsely accused of espionage, subjected to a drumhead court martial and found guilty. He was executed by firing squad, but later posthumously exonerated.

In December 1948, it was decided that in the event of further death sentences, all executions would be stayed until the government determined the fate of the death penalty. The first death sentences imposed by an Israeli civil court, against two Arabs who had been found guilty of murder, were confirmed by an appeals court in November 1949, but the sentences were commuted to life imprisonment by President Chaim Weizmann, due to his opposition to the death penalty. The Israeli cabinet first considered abolishing the death penalty in July 1949.

In 1950, seven convicted murderers were on death row in Israel. In 1951, the Israeli cabinet again proposed that the death penalty be abolished. The 1950 Nazis and Nazi Collaborators (Punishment) Law prescribes a mandatory death sentence for the most serious crimes in the law, which was first imposed in 1952 on Yechezkel Ingster, who was convicted of crimes against humanity for torturing and beating other Jews as a kapo. The court also recommended that the death sentence be commuted; he had lost a leg and suffered from a heart ailment. Ingster served time in jail and was later pardoned but died shortly after he was released. In 1953, another death sentence for murder was imposed. It was not carried out, and the convicted murderer received a presidential pardon six years later.

In 1954, the Knesset voted to abolish the death penalty for the crime of murder. The death penalty was retained for war crimes, crimes against humanity, crimes against the Jewish people, treason and certain crimes under military law during wartime.

In 1962, the second execution—and the only civil execution—in Israel took place when Adolf Eichmann was hanged after being convicted in 1961 of participation in Nazi war crimes relating to the Holocaust.

Throughout the following decades, death sentences were occasionally handed down to those convicted of terrorist offenses, but these sentences were always commuted. In 1988, John Demjanjuk, a guard in a Nazi death camp during the war, was convicted of war crimes and sentenced to death after being identified as the guard nicknamed "Ivan the Terrible" by inmates for his brutality, but his identification, conviction and sentence were later overturned on appeal. In the mid-1990s, the practice of seeking the death penalty for those facing terrorism charges ceased.

In the aftermath of the Itamar attack in 2011, the issue of the death penalty briefly came up again. Israeli military prosecutors were expected to seek the death penalty for the perpetrators, but in the end did not. Even so, the judges seriously considered imposing the death penalty when determining the sentence of one of the perpetrators, but decided not to, as the prosecution had not requested it.

In the March 2015 election, the Yisrael Beiteinu party ran on a platform that included death sentences for terrorists; in July of the same year a bill was proposed, and sponsored by one of the party's members, to allow a majority of presiding judges to sentence a terrorist to death. By a vote of 94–6 the bill was rejected in its first reading.

=== Calls for imposition of the death penalty ===
Israeli politicians have sometimes called for the imposition of the death penalty on specific criminals. In 2010, Member of the Knesset Ayoub Kara called for the imposition of the death penalty on the perpetrator of the Tapuah Junction stabbing. In 2017, political figures including Prime Minister Benjamin Netanyahu called for the penalty to be imposed on the perpetrator of the Halamish stabbing attack. In January 2018, a bill making it easier for military courts to hand down death sentences, proposed by members of Yisrael Beiteinu, was approved by the Knesset in a preliminary vote of 52-49 and transferred to the Constitution, Law and Justice Committee to be prepared for its first reading. Prime Minister Netanyahu voted in favor, but later said the bill required "deeper discussion" among the ministers before being voted on again. In November however the chairman of the Constitution, Law and Justice Committee said votes on the bill would be delayed indefinitely because of disagreements within the coalition and no majority in the committee.

==== For terrorism ====
In June 2022, a death penalty for terrorists bill was defeated in its preliminary reading.

In March 2023, a bill for the death penalty against terrorism offences was passed in the Knesset in a preliminary vote by 55-9. The bill was sponsored by an Otzma Yehudit member.

On 3 November 2025, the Knesset National Security Committee advanced the Penal Bill (Amendment No. 159) (Death Penalty for Terrorists), 2025, allowing it to be read in the Knesset's plenum. According to the leader of Otzma Yehudit Itamar Ben-Gvir, the bill had the approval of Prime Minister Benjamin Netanyahu. On 10 November, the Knesset passed the first reading by a 39–16 vote and will now go to committees for further discussions. Ben-Gvir also urged all political parties to support the law, claiming it was intended to establish deterrence against "Arab terrorism".

On 30 March 2026, the Penal Bill (Amendment No. 159) (Death Penalty for Terrorists), 2025 was passed 62-48 in the Knesset. Under its most recent wording, death by hanging will be the default sentence imposed on Palestinians in the West Bank convicted of fatal acts of terrorism, though Ben-Gvir has mentioned the possibility of electrocution or lethal injection as alternative methods. The execution must be carried out within 90 days of sentencing, with no right to clemency. The legislation further establishes regulations that restrict clemency and expedite the execution process. The law prompted immediate legal challenge; ACRI petitioned the Supreme Court on the day of passage to have it struck down, arguing it is unconstitutional under Israel's Basic Law: Human Dignity and Liberty and discriminatory in that it creates separate sentencing tracks for Israeli and Palestinian defendants.

== Public opinion ==
A 2017 poll found that close to 70% of Israelis would support giving the death penalty, after a trial, to terrorists who are convicted of murdering Israeli citizens.

== List of people executed in Israel ==
Name	Date of execution	Crime(s)	Method	President
Meir Tobianski	June 30, 1948	Treason (posthumously exonerated)	Firing squad	Chaim Weizmann
Adolf Eichmann	June 1, 1962	Crimes against humanity, war crimes, crimes against the Jewish people, and membership in an outlawed organization involving the murder of many Jews.	Hanging	Yitzhak Ben-Zvi

== See also ==
- Capital and corporal punishment in Judaism
- Human rights in Israel
- Israeli targeted killings
- List of capital crimes in the Torah
- Religion and capital punishment
