= List of capital crimes in the Torah =

According to the Torah or the Law of Moses, these are some of the offenses which may merit the death penalty.

== Religious practices ==
- Sacrificing to gods other than Yahweh.
- Sacrificing offspring to Molech.
- Worshipping Baal Peor.
- A prophet who says to follow gods other than Yahweh.
- A person who follows gods other than Yahweh.
- A false prophet, one whose prophecies do not come to pass.
- Necromancy, according to the Masoretic Text; specifically those who are masters over ghosts (Hebrew: Ba'al ob) and those who gain information from the dead (Hebrew: Yidde'oni). The Septuagint instead condemns gastromancy (Greek: eggastrimuthos), and enchantment (Greek: epaoidos).
- According to the Masoretic Text, practitioners of kashaph – incanting maleficium. According to the Septuagint version of the same passages, pharmakeia – poisoners; drug users for the purposes of hallucinogenic experiences. Historically this passage has been translated into English using vague terminology, condemning witchcraft (or sorcery) in general.
- Blaspheming Yahweh.
- Working on the Sabbath.
- Being a non-Levite ("common man") and approaching the tabernacle.

== Sexual practices ==
- Being participant in sexual activity, in which a betrothed woman loses her virginity to another man
- Raping a betrothed woman in the countryside.
- Adultery with a married woman. Both parties are to die.
- Marrying one's wife's mother. This was in addition to one's wife; death is by burning.
- Certain forms of incest, namely if it involves the father's wife or a daughter-in-law. Other forms of incest receive lesser punishment; sexual activity with a sister/stepsister is given excommunication for a punishment; if it involves a brother's wife or an uncle's wife, it is just cursed, and sexual activity with an aunt that is a blood relation is merely criticised.
- Certain sexual activities between males (Hebrew: zakhar) involving what the Masoretic Text literally terms lie lyings (of a) woman (Hebrew: tishkav mishkvei ishah), and the Septuagint literally terms beds [verb] the woman's/wife's bed (Greek: koimethese koiten gynaikos); the gender of the target of the command is commonly understood to be male.
- Bestiality. Both the human and the animal are to die.
- Prostitution by the daughter of a priest; death is by burning.
- A newlywed young woman who displeases her husband by not bleeding on the wedding-night sheet (a purported sign of virginity) can be executed by stoning in front of her father's house.

== Homicide ==
- Murder, believed by Jews to apply to non-Jews as well. Sanctuary at the altar was not permitted.
- If an ox has gored in the past, and the owner has been warned about the behavior of the ox but has failed to confine it, and it gores and kills another person, the owner is to be put to death. If the interested party requires payment of a fee, death is not required. If a slave is killed, the owner of the ox is to pay a fine. The ox itself is to be stoned in all cases of lethal goring.

== Parental discipline ==
- Smiting a parent.
- Cursing a parent.
- A son who persists in disobeying his parents.

== Courts ==
- Disobeying the decision of the court.
- False witness to a capital crime.

== Kidnapping ==
- "Stealing" an Israelite into slavery.

== See also ==
- 613 commandments
- Capital punishment in Judaism
- Capital punishment
- Christian views on the Old Covenant
- Crime and punishment in the Bible
- Death penalty in the Bible
- Draco (lawgiver)
- Jewish ethics
- Religion and capital punishment
- Sanhedrin
- Seven Laws of Noah
- Twelve Tables
- Witchcraft and divination in the Hebrew Bible
