= Special military tribunal law =

Israel's special military tribunal law applies to Palestinians accused of participation in the 7 October attacks. They will be tried before livestreamed special tribunals and liable to sentences including death.

== Legislative history ==
Simcha Rothman, a member of the Religious Zionist Party which sits in government, and Yulia Malinovsky, a member of the opposition Yisrael Beiteinu party, jointly proposed the legislation, which passed with 93 votes in favour and none against.

== Provisions ==
Any person charged or convicted under the law may not be included in prisoner release agreements. According to a briefing by HaMoked, the Public Committee Against Torture in Israel and Adalah, the law allows "deviation from standard rules of evidence and procedural rules", provides for hearings before judges in the selection of whom the Chief of the General Staff and military authorities play a "central role", and, in providing for livestreaming, effectively "transform[s] criminal proceedings into show trials".

== See also ==
- Death Penalty for Terrorists Law
