= Crime and punishment in the Torah =

The Hebrew Bible is considered a holy text in most Abrahamic religions. It records a large number of events and laws that are endorsed or proscribed by the God of Israel. Judaism teaches that the Torah contains 613 commandments, many of which deal with crime and punishment, but only the Noahide Laws apply to humanity in general. Most Christian denominations have also adopted some of these directives, such as the Ten Commandments and Great Commandment, while a minority believes all Old Covenant laws have been abrogated.

== In the Book of Exodus ==
Moses negotiated the Exodus from Egypt with Pharaoh leading to the Ten plagues.

When Pharaoh enslaved the Children of Israel, the Egyptians appointed conscription officers over the Israelites to crush their spirits with hard labor. The Israelites were to build up the cities of Pithom and Ra'amses as supply centers for Pharaoh. They made the lives of the Israelites miserable with harsh labor involving mortar and bricks, as well as all kinds of work in the field. Then he issued decrees to kill all the Israelite males. God hardened Pharaoh's heart, so that he would not allow the Hebrews to leave, and then God sent various disasters onto the whole of Egypt. Exodus includes the story of the killing of every firstborn child in Egypt as the final punishment for having enslaved the Israelites.

== The Midianites ==
In Numbers 25, the people of Midian together with Moab began to interact with the people of Israel, who were staying in Shittim. At this time, Israelite men began to have sexual relations with Moabite women. After being invited by Moabite women, some Israelite men participated in eating sacrificial meals and worshipping Moabite deities. The LORD then ordered a daylight execution of all those that had fornicated and worshipped with the Moabites.

While the Israelites were still assembled in mourning after the execution, an Israelite man, Zimri the son of Salu, publicly brought a Midianite woman, Cozbi daughter of Zur, into his tent. Phinehas, a grandson of Aaron, left the assembly, went inside the tent, and drove a javelin through both Zimri and Cozbi. Because of Phinehas' act, the LORD's wrath was turned away from the children of Israel. The LORD then ordered Moses to attack the Midianites for plotting against the Israelites in the matters of Peor and Cozbi.

After an army of 12,000 (1000 from each tribe) was sent against the Midianites, Moses was angry when the army returned with captive women and other spoils, because the women had played vital roles in the previous trespasses and consequent plague.

Moses then ordered all males and non-virgin females killed, and all female virgins preserved. One of every five hundred remaining captives of the soldiers' plunder was to be put in service as tribute to the LORD under Eleazar the priest (Numbers 31:28) as "heave offerings", thanksgiving for success. Out of the booty that belonged to Israelites, one of every fifty was set apart to the Levites who cared for the Tabernacle. (Numbers 31:30)

== Special punishments ==
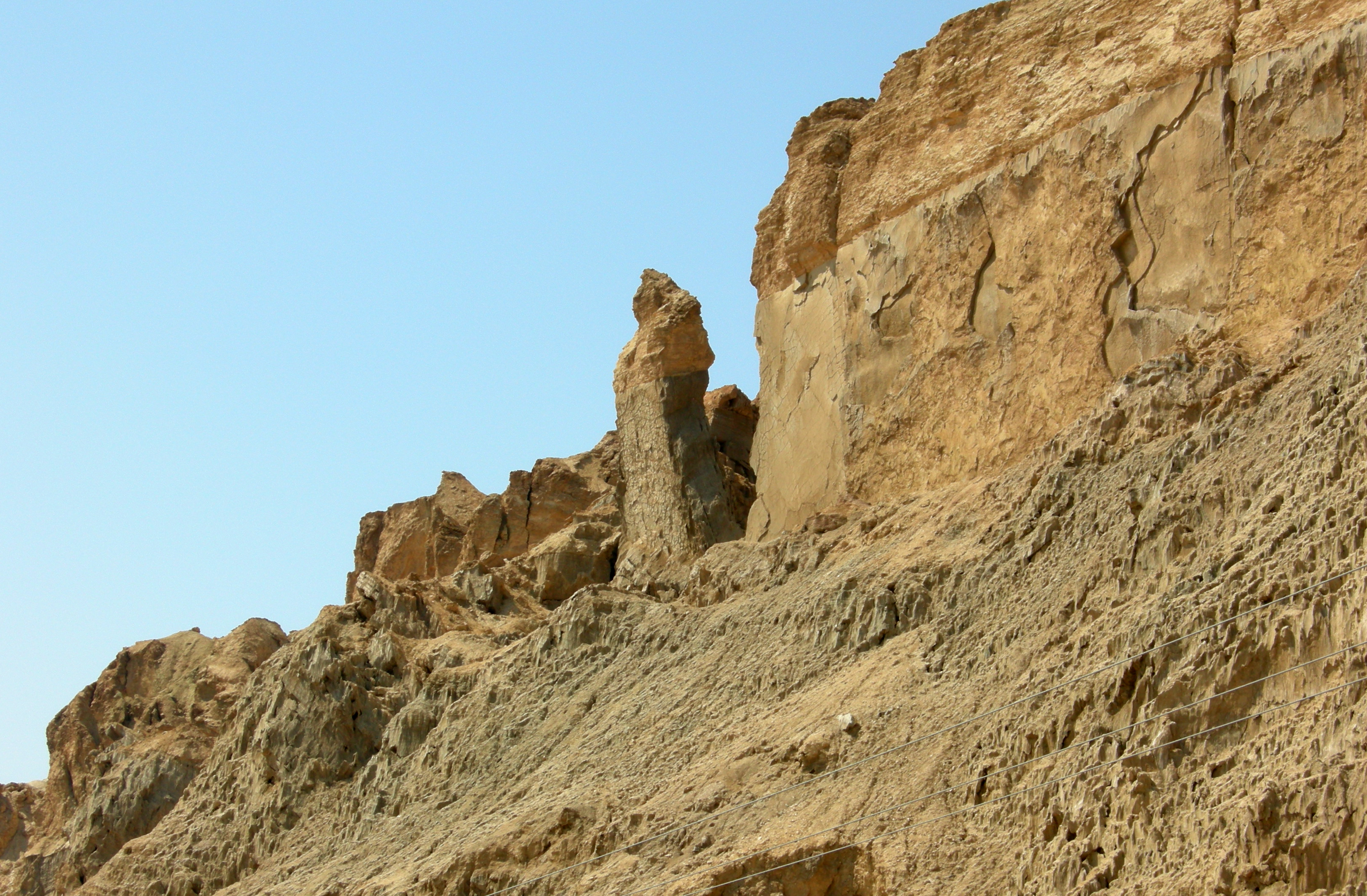
Mount Sodom, Israel, showing a pillar referred to as "Lot's Wife", made of halite.

- Noah cursed Canaan to be a servant to his brother's servants and a servant to his fathers brothers. (see Curse of Ham)
- Lot's wife "became a pillar of salt" when she "looked back" when fleeing Sodom and Gomorrah's destruction.
- God killed Onan for depriving his sister-in-law of child by having sex with her with no intention of impregnating her as agreed. After Onan's brother Er died, his father Judah told him to fulfill his duty as a brother-in-law to Tamar, by giving her offspring. Centuries later, in the days of Moses, this practice was formulated into a law of a Levirate marriage, where the brother of the deceased would provide offspring to the childless widow to preserve the family line. However, when Onan had sex with Tamar, he disregarded this principle when he withdrew before climax and spilled his semen on the ground, since any child born would not legally be considered his heir. (Genesis 38:3–10)

== Examples of the death penalty ==
The Bible prescribes the death penalty for the following activities, among others:

- Murder
- Adultery
- Bestiality
- Rape of a betrothed virgin
- One man picked up sticks on the Sabbath, he was taken into custody because a punishment was not known. The LORD told Moses that the man in custody must be killed. This particular crime and punishment is isolated case law.(Numbers 15:32–36)
- The man and woman when a man meets a betrothed woman in town and sleeps with her. But if it is a case of rape where out in the country she called for help and no one heard, the death penalty only applies to the man
- A woman who is found not to have been a virgin on the night of her wedding
- Worshiping other gods
- Witchcraft
- Taking the LORD's name in vain or cursing his name
- Cursing a parent
- Kidnapping
- Rebellion against parents
- Having a spirit of divination

== Implementation ==
There is some question as to whether the death penalty was invariably or even usually implemented in ancient Israel, or whether this was even the intention of the Tanakh (cf. Numbers 35:31). "It must be noted that the death penalty might also indicate the seriousness of the crime without calling for the actual implementation of it in every case. In fact, there is little evidence that many of these sanctions were ever actually carried out in ancient Israel. Only in the case of premeditated murder was there the added stricture of 'Do not accept a ransom for the life of the murderer who deserves to die' (Num 35:31). . . . Traditional wisdom, both in the Jewish and Christian communities, interpreted this verse in Numbers 35:31 to mean that out of the almost twenty cases calling for capital punishment in the Old Testament, every one of them could have the sanction commuted by an appropriate substitute of money or anything that showed the seriousness of the crime, but in the case of what we today call first-degree murder, there was never to be offered or accepted any substitute or bargaining of any kind: the offender had to pay with his or her life".

== See also ==
- Ethics in the Bible
- The Bible and death penalty
