= Death Penalty for Terrorists Law =

2026 Israeli law

The Death Penalty for Terrorists Act, 2026
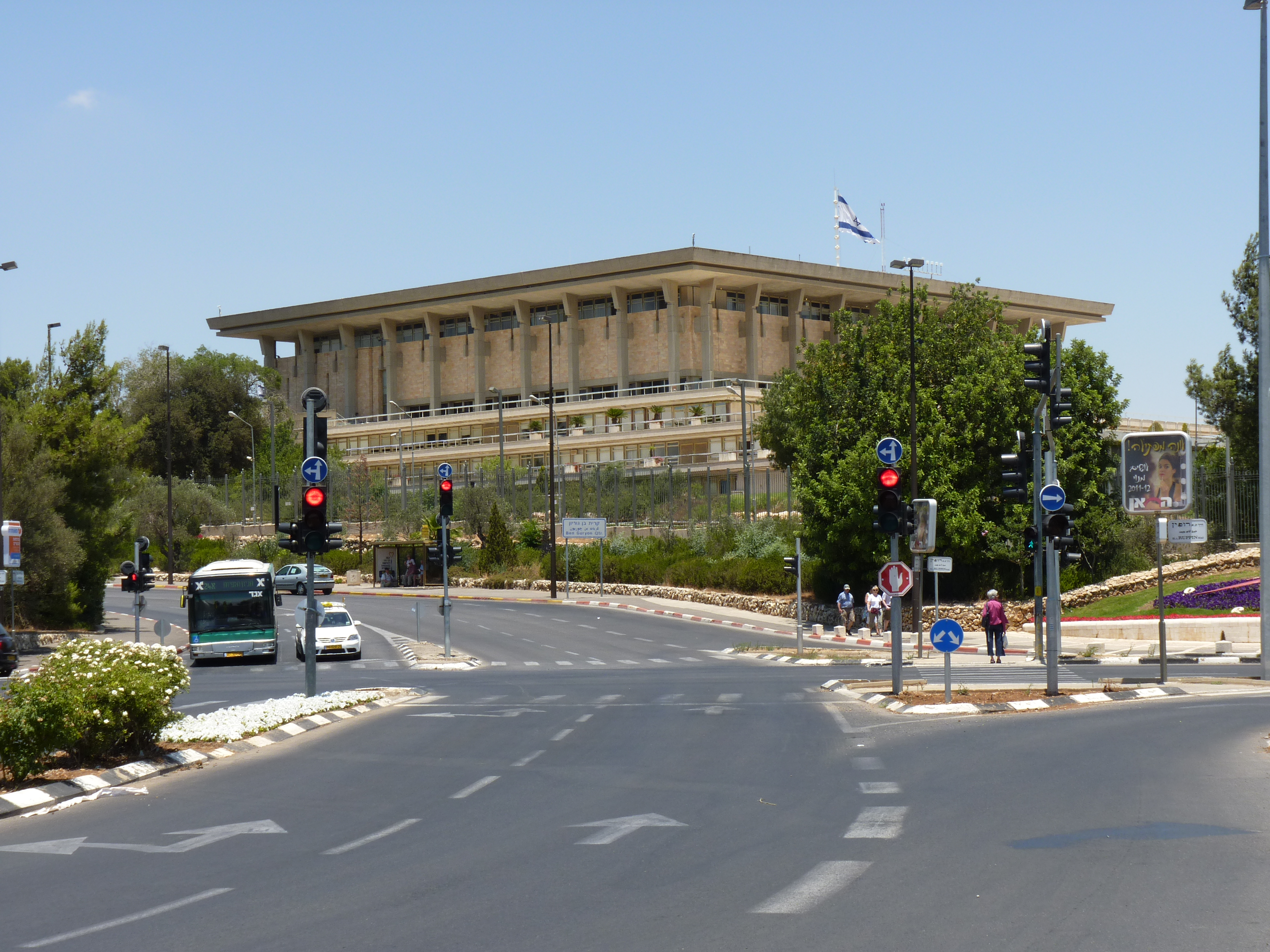

Knesset
- Long title: חוק עונש מוות למחבלים, התשפ"ו-2026
- Considered by: Knesset
- Passed: 30 March 2026

Legislative history
- Committee responsible: National Security Committee
- First reading: 10 November 2025
- Second reading: 30 March 2026
- Third reading: 30 March 2026
- Voting summary: 62 voted for; 48 voted against; 1 abstained

Text of statute as originally enacted
- Status: Current legislation

The Death Penalty for Terrorists Law (Hebrew: חוק עונש מוות למחבלים, romanized: Khok Onish Mavet laMechablim) is a 2026 Israeli law. It prescribes execution by hanging for certain terrorist offences, and in practice applies only to Palestinians and not Israeli Jews. The bill was passed 62–48 by the Knesset on 30 March 2026.

== Background ==
Before the passage of the law, capital punishment in Israel under existing laws had been carried out twice, against Meir Tobianski, who was falsely accused of treason during the 1948 Arab–Israeli War, and against former Nazi official Adolf Eichmann.

The New York Times reported that a "majority of Jewish Israelis" supported the imposition of the death penalty, according to polls. The Institute for Liberty and Responsibility reported that it had conducted a survey of all Israelis, according to which over 60% "in principle…support…the imposition of the death penalty" from September 2023 to March 2024.

== Legislative history ==
The bill was initiated by the Otzma Yehudit, a far-right political party led by the national security minister Itamar Ben-Gvir. Members of the party began wearing noose-shaped pins on their lapel during sessions of the Knesset in support of the bill.

On 10 November 2025, the bill passed its first reading.

In initial hearings in September 2025, Gal Hirsch, a coordinator of efforts to free Israeli hostages during the Gaza war, opposed the bill, but later changed position. The legal adviser to the National Security Committee of the Knesset, who reviewed the bill, argued it was discriminatory and unconstitutional. Although senior Shin Bet officials had previously opposed the introduction of the death penalty, David Zini, whom Netanyahu had appointed that year to head the agency, supported the legislation. The Israel Defense Forces did not oppose the death penalty in general but opposed its mandatory imposition.

In February, The Times of Israel reported that Benjamin Netanyahu, the prime minister, had asked Ben-Gvir to "soften" the law's wording for fear of "international legal repercussions and domestic legal challenges", backed by the National Security Council, Shin Bet, and foreign ministry; the modifications envisaged included judicial discretion to substitute life imprisonment for the death penalty, and the removal of a condition that the death penalty could only be applied when the victim of the crime is an Israeli citizen. The committee approved the changes.

On 25 March 2026, the final version of the bill was approved by a parliamentary committee.

Before the vote, Ben-Gvir said "From today, every terrorist will know, and the whole world will know, that whoever takes a life, the State of Israel will take their life".

The bill was passed 62–47. All the parties that formed the 2022 Netanyahu-led coalition, excepting the Agudat Yisrael, faction of United Torah Judaism (UTJ), voted in favour, including the Likud, Shas, Otzma Yehudit, New Hope, Religious Zionist and the Degel HaTorah faction of UTJ (which later left the coalition). The right-wing opposition party Yisrael Beiteinu supported the bill. All other parties voted against the bill; these included Yesh Atid, Blue and White, The Democrats, and the Arab parties United Arab List, Hadash, and Ta'al (Hadash–Ta'al).

== Provisions ==
The law imposes the death penalty on persons convicted of fatal terrorist attacks. (Note: Under Israeli law, terrorists are defined under "The Counter-Terrorism Law, 5776-2016".) In military courts, the death penalty is the "default"; only Palestinians are tried. In civilian courts, both Israelis and Palestinians are tried, but the law applies only to those who "'intentionally cause the death of a person with the aim of denying the existence of the State of Israel'—a definition designed to exclude Jewish terrorists". (Note: Ha'aretz writes that the law "creates a distinction designating it almost exclusively for Palestinian terror, while the ideological burden of proof it sets is expected to make its application to Jewish nationalist terror nearly impossible".) It therefore "effectively enshrines capital punishment for Palestinians alone".

The law permits life imprisonment as an alternative in "vaguely defined 'special circumstances'"; the death penalty is otherwise "mandatory" and "must be carried out within 90 days of sentencing".

== Implementation ==
On 17 May, the commander of the Israeli central command signed an order putting the law into effect.

== Reaction ==
=== Experts' reactions ===
Before the passage of the law, the Israel Medical Association said medical ethics prohibited participation in executions.

Yoav Sapir, a law professor who previously headed Israel's public defenders' office, and Volker Türk (UN High Commissioner for Human Rights) said the bill discriminated against Palestinians since it would only apply to them. B'Tselem, Amnesty International and Human Rights Watch said such discrimination amounted to apartheid. In response to the law's adoption, United Nations Special Rapporteur on Torture Dr. Alice Jill Edwards said that "[c]apital punishment is incompatible with human dignity and has no proven deterrent effect”.

Carolyn Hoyle (professor of criminology and director of the death penalty research unit at Oxford) and Ron Dudai (criminology research associate at Ben-Gurion University) argued that the death penalty is ineffective in general and against terrorism in particular, in an expert opinion submitted to the Supreme Court of Israel.

A statement by Israeli scholars of international law said the death penalty law was immoral, discriminated against Palestinians by effectively only applying to them, and violated both Israeli and international law.

The UN Committee on the Elimination of Racial Discrimination said that the law "de facto appli[es] to Palestinians only" and was racially discriminatory.

=== Diplomatic reactions ===
Joint statements condemning the law were issued by

- Pakistan, Turkey, Egypt, Indonesia, Jordan, Qatar, Saudi Arabia and the United Arab Emirates; and
- Australia, Germany, France, Italy, New Zealand and the United Kingdom.

Separate statements condemning the law were made by China, Ireland, Canada, the Palestinian Authority, Hamas, the Council of Europe, and the European Union, which reminded Israel of its human rights obligations under the EU–Israel Association Agreement.

The United States Department of State said it "trust[ed]" there would be "fair trial[s]" and that Israel had a "sovereign right" to determine laws and penalties applying to terrorism.

=== Political reactions, protests and strikes ===
On 31 March 2026, the Israel Police violently dispersed protesters against the law in West Jerusalem. Haaretz reported that one photojournalist was injured. Five people were arrested in the protests.

Internationally, protests against the law were reported in Germany, Amsterdam, the Netherlands and in Daraa, Syria, with videos of Syrian motorcyclists carrying the Shahada flag while protesting against the law near an Israeli checkpoint.

The ruling Fatah party called a general strike in the West Bank on 2 April 2026, closing businesses and public institutions. Protests were held in Ramallah, Nablus and Gaza City, With most businesses in Hebron, Ramallah, and Nablus shutting down in protest, Israeli soldiers forced Palestinian shop owners taking part in the strike in 'Anata, northeast of the Old City of Jerusalem, to open their businesses. Israeli police fired rubber bullets, stun grenades, and tear gas at Palestinians burning tyres at the Qalandia checkpoint between the West Bank and Israel.

28 members of the British House of Commons signed an early day motion tabled mid-April stating the law "may amount to discriminatory treatment and contribute to a system of apartheid". On 22 April, Petra Bayr, president of the Parliamentary Assembly of the Council of Europe, said the Israeli Knesset's membership "might be suspended until there is a decision [against] or until it is clear that the law will not even go into force", and that the death penalty in general precluded membership.

The president of Israel, Isaac Herzog, said the bill was "problematic" and asked how the bill would be implemented; according to a later statement, he was asking "sarcastically" about the law's requirement that court presidents and other officials should watch executions.

=== Media reactions ===
Editorials in The Guardian, Le Monde, ABC, Sudinfo, and Haaretz and columns in The Independent, Outlook, UnHerd, The Forward, Ynet, The Guardian, The Globe and Mail, The Quint, the Middle East Eye, Arutz Sheva, The Jerusalem Post, and the Times of Israel condemned the law.

Columnists in The Jerusalem Post and Jewish News Syndicate supported the death penalty.

=== Jewish groups' reactions ===
In North America, the Reform movement, J Street, Partners for Progressive Israel, JSpace Canada and T'ruah condemned the law, the Conservative movement expressed reservations, the Anti-Defamation League and Jewish Federations of North America said they had no comment, and the Zionist Organization of America supported the law. In Australia, AIJAC and the Zionist Federation opposed the law, and the Executive Council of Australian Jewry expressed concerns that the law is a departure from Jewish principles. The Board of Deputies of British Jews condemned the law. The president of the umbrella Representative Council of French Jewish Institutions denounced the law.

== Legal challenges ==
=== Challenges announced ===
Legal challenges were announced by the following political parties: Yesh Atid, Hadash–Ta’al, and The Democrats.

=== Petitions filed ===
On 30 March, the Association for Civil Rights in Israel filed a petition against the law. The association said the law was racially discriminatory, the Knesset was not permitted to directly legislate for the West Bank, and the death penalty's alleged deterrent effect was unproven. The same day, Adalah filed a petition supported by the Public Committee Against Torture in Israel, HaMoked, Physicians for Human Rights–Israel, and Gisha and Hadash–Ta'al MKs Aida Touma-Suleiman, Ahmad Tibi and Ayman Odeh.

On 31 March, the High Court ordered the government to respond to requests for an interim order suspending the application of the law pending a final decision.

Gilad Kariv, Zulat and Rabbis for Human Rights petitioned the court on 5 April. The petition, in common with others, argued that the law is discriminatory and unconstitutional, that the Knesset has no authority to directly legislate for the West Bank, and that in any case it would not deter terrorism and might be counterproductive.

=== Commentary on legal challenges ===
Ben-Gvir told The Jerusalem Post the law was modelled on the "correct and just" US model for the death penalty, that in visits to prisons the deterrent effect was already evident, and that legal challenges would fail.

An analysis in the Times of Israel said that the law had "serious constitutional defects", violated the right to life, discriminated against Palestinians, and was of uncertain effectiveness against terrorism. The analysis said that the court could decline to quash the law in its entirety, due to caution in intervening in matters of national security, and the political context, or could quash only parts of the law. A Knesset source and legal expert said the law was deliberately written to elicit judicial intervention; the legal expert said this would allow the coalition to attack the courts, and the Knesset source said the purpose of the law was to assist the governing coalition's campaign for re-election.

== See also ==
- Capital punishment by country
- International human rights law
- Right to life
- Special military tribunal law
