= Capital punishment in the Bible =

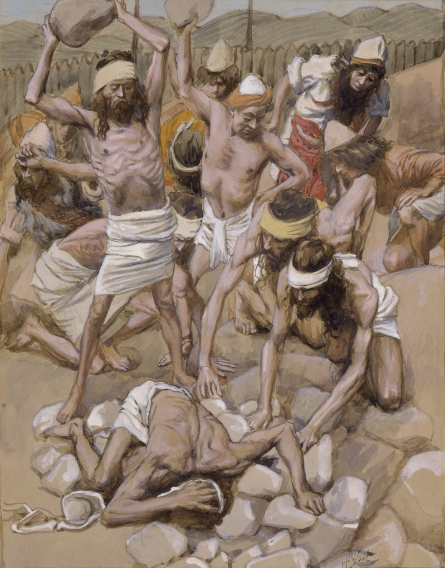
The Sabbath-Breaker Stoned (Numbers 15). James Tissot c.1900

There are numerous instances in the Bible where death is called for as a punishment and also instances where it is proscribed or prohibited. A case against capital punishment in Christianity, specifically, may be made from John 8, where Jesus speaks words that can be construed as condemning the practice. In that chapter, Jesus disallows the stoning of a woman who has committed adultery, which is the traditional punishment as given in the Torah. There are many other Bible verses that condone or even command capital punishment, and there are examples of it being carried out. Sins that were traditionally punishable by death include homicide, striking one's parents, kidnapping, cursing one's parents, witchcraft and divination, bestiality, worshiping other gods, violating the Sabbath, child sacrifice, adultery, incest, and male homosexual intercourse (there is no biblical legal punishment for lesbians mentioned).

== Against capital punishment ==
While the Bible very clearly condones and commands capital punishment, there are verses that can be interpreted as opposing the practice. For example, when Cain murdered Abel, God sentenced him to wandering as a fugitive rather than to death, and even issued a warning against killing Cain. A similar sentiment is suggested in Proverbs 28:17. It is seen from 2 Samuel 14:1-11 that kings would grant clemency in extenuating circumstances. In that case, the one who had killed was an only child, and the king allowed him to remain alive under house arrest. The prophets repeatedly beseech the masses to repent so that God will not destroy them. Additionally, there are numerous verses that condemn revenge, judging, anger and hatred, as well as those that promote peace, harmony, forgiveness and acceptance.

Hiers (2004 & 2009) shows that the laws related to capital punishment shifted over time with old laws being abandoned, and new laws taking their place; however, he points out that some later laws seem to mitigate the severity of earlier ones. He further quotes Glen Stassen who argues that even in biblical times, capital punishment was "gradually, if not progressively" being abandoned, pointing out that capital punishment is rarely found in the Prophets and the Writings. Paul Onyango cites Carol Meyers argues that treatment of adulteresses in Ezekiel 16 and 23 is far more progressive than that of other ancient near eastern cultures of the time, due to its avoidance/rejection of capital punishment.

Perhaps the strongest case against capital punishment can be made from John 8, where Jesus seems to say that capital punishment should not be carried out contrary to Mosaic law. In John 8, the Pharisees challenge Jesus by presenting a woman who they say committed adultery. They point out that the law of Moses clearly states that such a woman ought be stoned, and challenge Jesus to give his opinion as to what should be done. Jesus famously states "let he who is without sin throw the first stone," effectively saying that capital punishment should not be carried out, without directly contradicting the law of Moses.

While these examples may show that there was at least some opposition to capital punishment and decline in usage, there can be no doubt that there are far more numerous verses that command and condone capital punishment, and examples of it being carried out.

== Old Testament ==
=== Capital offences ===
The Bible identifies the following offences as punishable by death. At least two witnesses were required, and rabbinic tradition imposed further conditions to prevent erroneous convictions.

Offences that are punishable by death in the Torah, include the following:

Murder, striking or smiting one's parents, kidnapping, cursing one's parents, occult practice, bestiality, worshipping other gods, Sabbath desecration, child sacrifice, adultery, incest, male homosexual intercourse (female homosexual intercourse is unmentioned), prostitution by the daughter of a priest (Kohen), blasphemy of the Tetragrammaton, the assembly or disassembly of the Tabernacle by a non-Levite, the performance of priestly duties by a non-Kohen, the promotion of, and conversion to, non-YHWH worship, defiant refusal to accept the decision of the court, capital perjury, recidivistic rebellion against parents, perjury accusing one's betrothed of lacking her virginity, consensual sexual intercourse with a betrothed woman, and rape.

=== Methods ===
The most common method mentioned is by stoning, followed by burning, and then by sword (once). There is a verse that mentions hanging; however, it is unclear as to whether this is a separate method of punishment, or something done with the body after it was dead. The verse goes on to command that the body is not to be left up overnight, but rather must be buried that day, since an impaled or hung body was offensive to God.

=== Examples of capital punishment ===
In the Genesis creation narrative (Book of Genesis 2:17), God tells Adam "But of the Tree of Knowledge of good and evil you shall not eat of it, for on the day that you eat thereof, you shall surely die." According to the Talmud, this verse is a death penalty.

In Genesis 38:24-26, when Judah is told that Tamar (his former daughter-in-law) had become a harlot and was pregnant, he sentences her to death by burning. However, she proves that he (Judah) is the father, and (apparently) the ruling is reversed.

During the period that the Israelites wandered the wilderness, examples include: A man was stoned for gathering wood on Sabbath, while another was stoned for blasphemy. In the rebellion of Korah, the ground opened up swallowing Korah, other leaders, and their families; and a heavenly fire consumed another 250 followers. The next day, all the Israelites railed against Moses and Aaron, blaming them for the deaths, and God sent a plague that killed another 14,700.

During the period of Kings, examples include: Elijah captured and "slaughtered" the prophets of Baal. King Asa and the tribes who followed him made a covenant to worship God and "whoever would not worship the LORD God of Israel would be put to death." King Ahab eliminated Naboth (to get his land) by getting false witnesses to testify that Naboth had blasphemed God and the King. In the uprising against Athaliah when Jehoash was appointed king of Judah, Mattan, the priest of Baal was killed.

== New Testament ==
=== Sermon on the Mount ===
The Sermon on the Mount rejects "an eye for an eye" and thus, implicitly, retributive justice, which has been argued to include capital punishment. Whether supportive or not, commentators establish the relevance of the Sermon to considerations of capital punishment, for example Augustine, who cites it in his analysis supporting capital punishment as carried out by duly constituted authority. In 2018 the Roman Catholic catechism changed to repudiate capital punishment in most circumstances, and the Vatican website explicitly references the Sermon on the Mount in justification for this.

=== Woman caught in adultery ===
In a passage that may be a later interpolation, John 8:3–11 mentions a woman caught in adultery being brought to Jesus for judgment. Jesus does not condemn her, but says "Go and from now on do not sin any more." (John 8:11)

=== Death of Jesus ===
Jesus is sentenced to death and dies on a cross in all four Gospels.

== Perspectives ==
Walter Harrelson in The Ten Commandments and Human Rights says "[t]here can be no question... of our sixth commandment's having the initial meaning that human life is never, under any circumstances, to be taken by another human being or by the appointed authorities in Israel."

Richard Hiers (2004 & 2009) writes:

In summary, biblical law gave expression to a highly positive evaluation of human life, and affirmed the bodily and moral integrity of persons individually, in families, and as an ordered and just society. Those whose conduct violated laws that served these interests might, therefore, be subject to the death penalty. Biblical law was particularly concerned lest innocent persons be wrongly executed. Moreover, only those who had recklessly or intentionally committed capital offenses were to be put to death. Numerous due process procedures were designed to effectuate these concerns. And those who sat in judgment were strongly admonished to do so impartially, according equal protection of the laws, whether the accused were rich or poor, native born or foreigners.

== See also ==
- Religion and capital punishment
