= Witchcraft and divination in the Hebrew Bible =

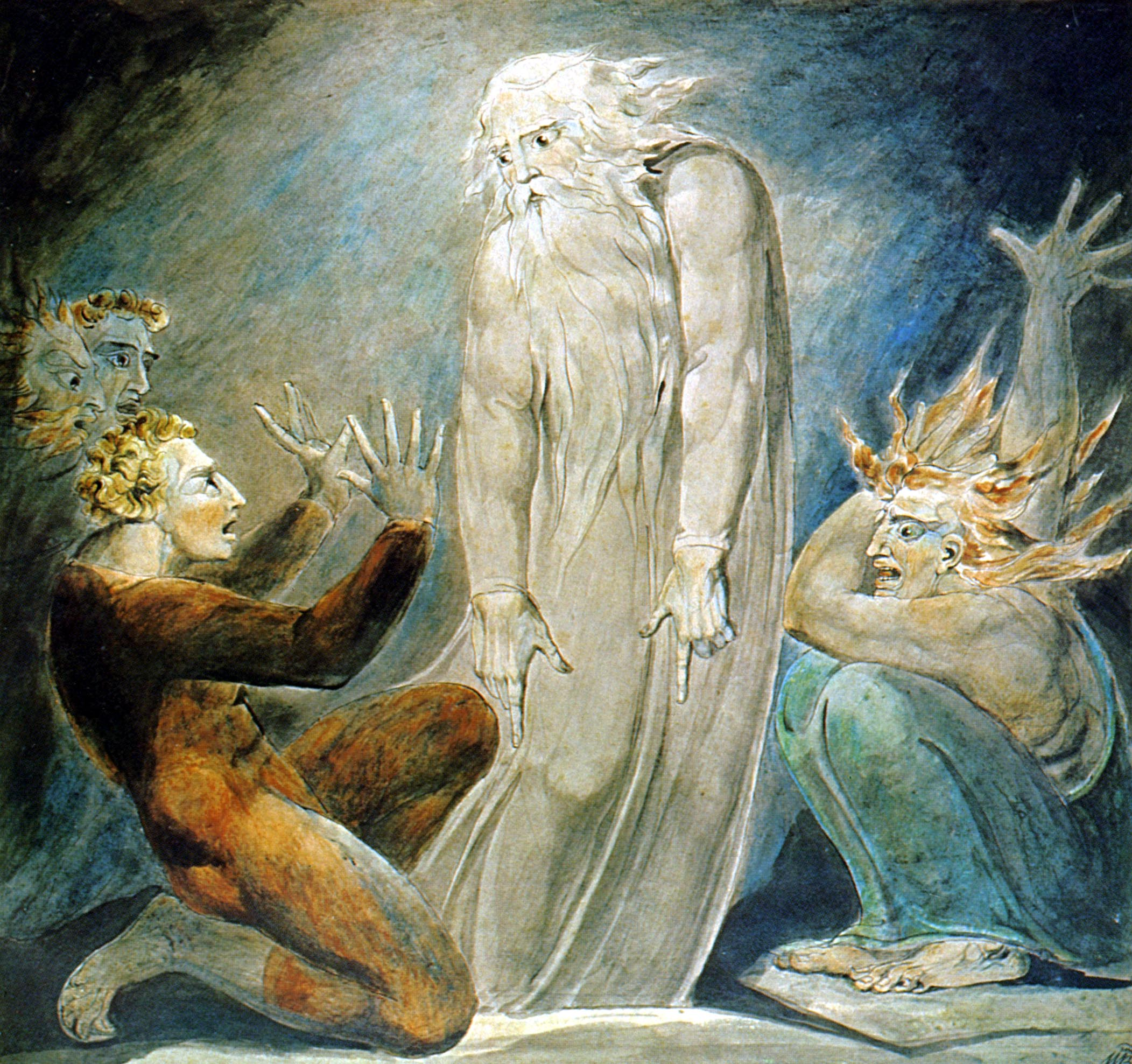
William Blake's painting of Saul, the shade of Samuel and the Witch of Endor

Various forms of witchcraft and divination are mentioned in the Hebrew Bible (Tanakh or Old Testament), which are expressly forbidden.

== Prohibitions ==
Laws prohibiting various forms of witchcraft and divination can be found in the books of Exodus, Leviticus and Deuteronomy. These include the following (as translated in the Revised JPS, 2023):

- Exodus 22:18 – "You shall not tolerate a sorceress [Biblical Hebrew: מְכַשֵּׁפָ֖ה, romanized: mək̲aššēp̄ā]."
- Leviticus 19:26 – "You shall not eat anything with its blood. You shall not practice divination or soothsaying [תְנַחֲשׁ֖וּ וְלֹ֥א תְעוֹנֵֽנוּ tənaḥăšu wəlo t̲əʿonēnu]."
- Leviticus 20:27 – "A man or a woman who has a ghost or a familiar spirit [א֛וֹב א֥וֹ יִדְּעֹנִ֖י ob̲ o yiddəʿoni] shall be put to death; they shall be pelted with stones—and the bloodguilt is theirs."
- Deuteronomy 18:10-11 – "Let no one be found among you who consigns a son or daughter to the fire, or who is an augur, a soothsayer, a diviner, a sorcerer, one who casts spells, or one who consults ghosts or familiar spirits, or one who inquires of the dead [דֹרֵ֖שׁ אֶל־הַמֵּתִֽים dorēš el-hammēt̲im]."

The forms of divination mentioned in Deuteronomy 17 are portrayed as foreign to the Hebrews; this is the only part of the Hebrew Bible to make such a claim. According to Ann Jeffers, the presence of laws forbidding necromancy "proves" that it was practiced throughout Israel's history.

The exact difference between the three forbidden forms of necromancy mentioned in Deuteronomy 18:11 is a matter of uncertainty; yiddeʿoni ("wizard") is always used together with ov "consulter with familiar spirits", and its semantic similarity to doresh el hametim ("necromancer", or "one who directs inquiries to the dead") raises the question of why all three are mentioned in the same verse. The Jewish tractate Sanhedrin makes the distinction that a doresh el hametim was a person who would sleep in a cemetery after having starved himself, in order to become possessed.

A prophetic passage in the Book of Micah states that witchcraft and soothsaying will be eliminated in the Messianic Age (Micah 5:12).

Classical Medieval Jewish commentators differed on whether the prohibitions against witchcraft implied that those practices had actual power. Maimonides denied such a suggestion, while Nachmanides contended that it did.

== Instances in Biblical narrative ==
- In the Book of Exodus, Egyptian magicians replicate several of the signs delivered to the Biblical Pharaoh by Moses and Aaron.
- In 1 Samuel 28, Saul enlists the Witch of Endor to summon the spirit of the deceased prophet Samuel, who rebukes him for using witchcraft.

== See also ==
- Ancient Jewish magic
- Christian views on magic
- Daemonologie
- Halakha
- Islam and magic
- Jewish views on astrology
- Mediumship
- Practical Kabbalah
- Semitic neopaganism
