= Religion and capital punishment =

The major world religions have taken varied positions on the morality of capital punishment and, as such, they have historically impacted the way in which governments handle such punishment practices. Although the viewpoints of some religions have changed over time, their influence on capital punishment generally depends on the existence of a religious moral code and how closely religion influences the government. Religious moral codes are often based on a body of teachings, such as the Old Testament or the Qur'an.

Many Islamic nations have laws that have their base in Sharia law, which permits capital punishments for various acts. However, not all Islamic nations have the death penalty as a legal punishment.

Many early Christians were strongly opposed to the death penalty, and magistrates who enforced it could be excommunicated. Attitudes gradually began to relax in the fifth century. In the thirteenth century, Thomas Aquinas argued that capital punishment was a form of "lawful slaying", which became the standard Catholic teaching on the issue for centuries. During the Protestant Reformation, Martin Luther and John Calvin defended the death penalty, but Quakers, Brethren, and Mennonites have opposed it since their founding. Since the Second Vatican Council, the Roman Catholic Church has generally opposed the death penalty, in 1992, with the Catechism, Pope John Paul II accepted it use, with strict restrictions and in very rare situations, for the defense of others only, rejecting it use for retribution, and, in August 2018, Pope Francis revised the Catechism of the Catholic Church to explicitly condemn it in all cases as an inadmissible attack on the inviolability and dignity of the person.

Buddhism has a strong belief in compassion for the lives of others, as stated in the Panca-Sila (five precepts). There is an understanding of healing people who have committed crimes rather than retaliating against them. For these reasons, Buddhism has generally opposed the death penalty. China and Japan, both historically Buddhist countries, continue to practise the death penalty.

Judaism has a history of debate over the death penalty but generally disagrees with the practice. Although the Torah describes over 30 situations where the death penalty would be appropriate, there are many limitations that have made it difficult to implement. Since 1954, Israel has outlawed the use of the death penalty, except in cases of genocide and treason.

Hinduism has historically not taken a stance on the death penalty and has little influence on the government's opinion of it. However, India (an 80% Hindu nation) has the lowest rate of capital punishment of any other country. This is likely due to the belief in Ahimsa, or non-violence, which became very apparent during Gandhi's time and was supported by India's ancient Buddhist emperor Ashoka, who is the only leader in the country's history to openly oppose the death penalty.

== Baháʼí Faith ==
The Baháʼí Faith prescribes the death penalty, or life in prison, for murder and arson. Those punishments are intended for a future society and have never been implemented by Baháʼís. To dissuade others from comminiting such a crime again, Abdu’l-Bahá, a prominent religious figure in the Baha’i religion, conceded that society has a right of capital punishment if only for the ability to show others of its consequences and not for individual revenge. The Universal House of Justice is a democratically elected institution in the Baha’i faith and is a present representation of the laws of the Baha’i texts that promote a progress of societal peace. Details are left up to the supreme governing institution to clarify at some future date.

== Buddhism ==
Although the death penalty is generally opposed in Buddhist nations, it is difficult to identify a specific Buddhist opinion on capital punishment because some countries that are majority Buddhist do not follow religious principles. Buddhist principles may not carry much weight, even in the case of a Buddhist ruler, because there is no direct effort of Buddhist followers to encourage pacifism in their country. The five precepts are not a divine order from god, they are merely a set of ethical guidelines to live by. For this reason, rulers do not necessarily have to worry about being punished by God for not following them, and some leaders may choose to simply ignore these guidelines when trying to run a country.

=== Buddhist opposition to capital punishment ===
The first of the Five Precepts (Panca-sila) is to abstain from destruction of life. Chapter 10 of the Dhammapada states:

Everyone fears punishment; everyone fears death, just as you do. Therefore do not kill or cause to kill. Everyone fears punishment; everyone loves life, as you do. Therefore do not kill or cause to kill.

This concept is meant to encourage compassion (karuna) and that everyone has the opportunity to reach enlightenment. Buddhism retains the idea that all life should be valued and valuing the life of someone who does not necessarily value the life of others shows great compassion and non-violence (ahimsa). The concept of ahimsa also includes Karma, which recognizes that killing is an example of bad karma and that killing for revenge is seen as counterproductive. It is believed that even the lives of murderers have value. There is a strong focus on rehabilitation and killing people takes away their opportunity be helped. Killing for revenge is seen as counterproductive.

Chapter 26, the final chapter of the Dhammapada, states, "Him I call a brahmin who has put aside weapons and renounced violence toward all creatures. He neither kills nor helps others to kill." The story of the Jhanasanda-Jataka contains a similar message in talking about a prince who gets rid of all places of execution. Similarly, the Rajaparikatha-ratnamala contains advice given by the Buddhist Philosopher Nagarjuna and states that people should have compassion even for murderers and that banishment should be utilized as opposed to killing. This strong emphasis on compassion, in relation to capital punishment, is also evident in the story of Angulimala. Angulimala was a murderer that everyone in the village feared but despite this, the Buddha headed down the road to where Angulimata is rumored to live. Out of compassion, the Buddha finds him and teaches him how to be a monk. This exemplifies the Buddhist concept of rehabilitation, however, Angulimata had built up too much bad karma previously and died a painful death as a result.

Historically, many Buddhist Kings in India did not impose the death penalty. They charged fines instead and cut off a hand at worst. Some people view this as surprising because many pre-modern societies used capital punishment often. Many places used banishment instead and sent murders off to mountains in the desert with just enough food to survive. Both the current Dalai Lama and his immediate predecessor have openly opposed the death penalty. The previous Dalai Lama (1879–1933) abolished the death penalty in an attempt to reform Tibet's feudal system after he had previously avoided cases involving capital punishment because of his focus on being a religious figure.

=== Actions of Buddhist countries ===
Bhutan, Cambodia, and Thailand all recognise Buddhism as a state religion and use a Buddhist approach to address the issue of capital punishment. Thailand is the only one that retains capital punishment, though it has not used it since 2018.

Thailand is home to about 63 million people, 95 % of these people follow Theravada Buddhism and it has become central to the culture and identity of Thailand. Thailand's war on drugs may potentially explain its current retention of capital punishment. The manufacture and distribution of drugs is an offence for which death is mandatory. There were no executions in Thailand, however, between the years of 1988-1995 and 2004–2007.

Sri Lanka also recognizes Buddhism as its official state religion but appears to be moving toward an increase in its passage of death sentences. It is unclear, however, if this anything to do with its Buddhist beliefs. Unlike Thailand, Sri Lanka has had a long history of political and religious tension due to its history of being ruled by various countries. Its Buddhist influence was weakened by foreign rulers who believed in a suppression of Buddhist culture. A Buddhist monk was sentenced to death after his assassination of Prime Minister Bandaranaike in 1959 because he felt that he had not lived up to his political promises of promoting Buddhist culture within politics. There has not been an execution in Sri Lanka since 1977.

Although it is communist, Laos has a much less intense commitment to capital punishment than other nearby communist nations. This is likely due to the strong influence of Theravada Buddhism. Myanmar also has a strong Theravada Buddhism influence in its country and has not carried out any government ordered executions since 1989.

== Christianity ==
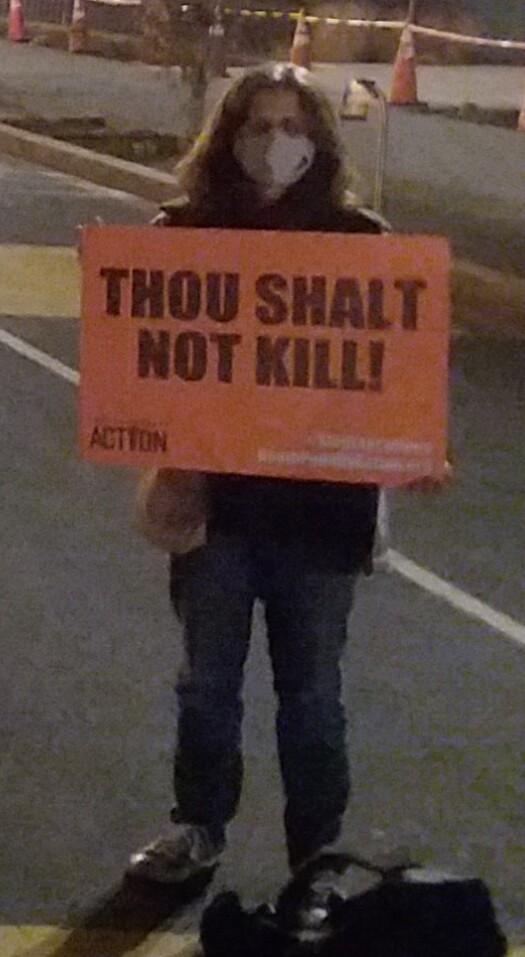
Person holding a sign saying "Thou shalt not kill" at the vigil of Dustin Higgs, who was executed in January 2021

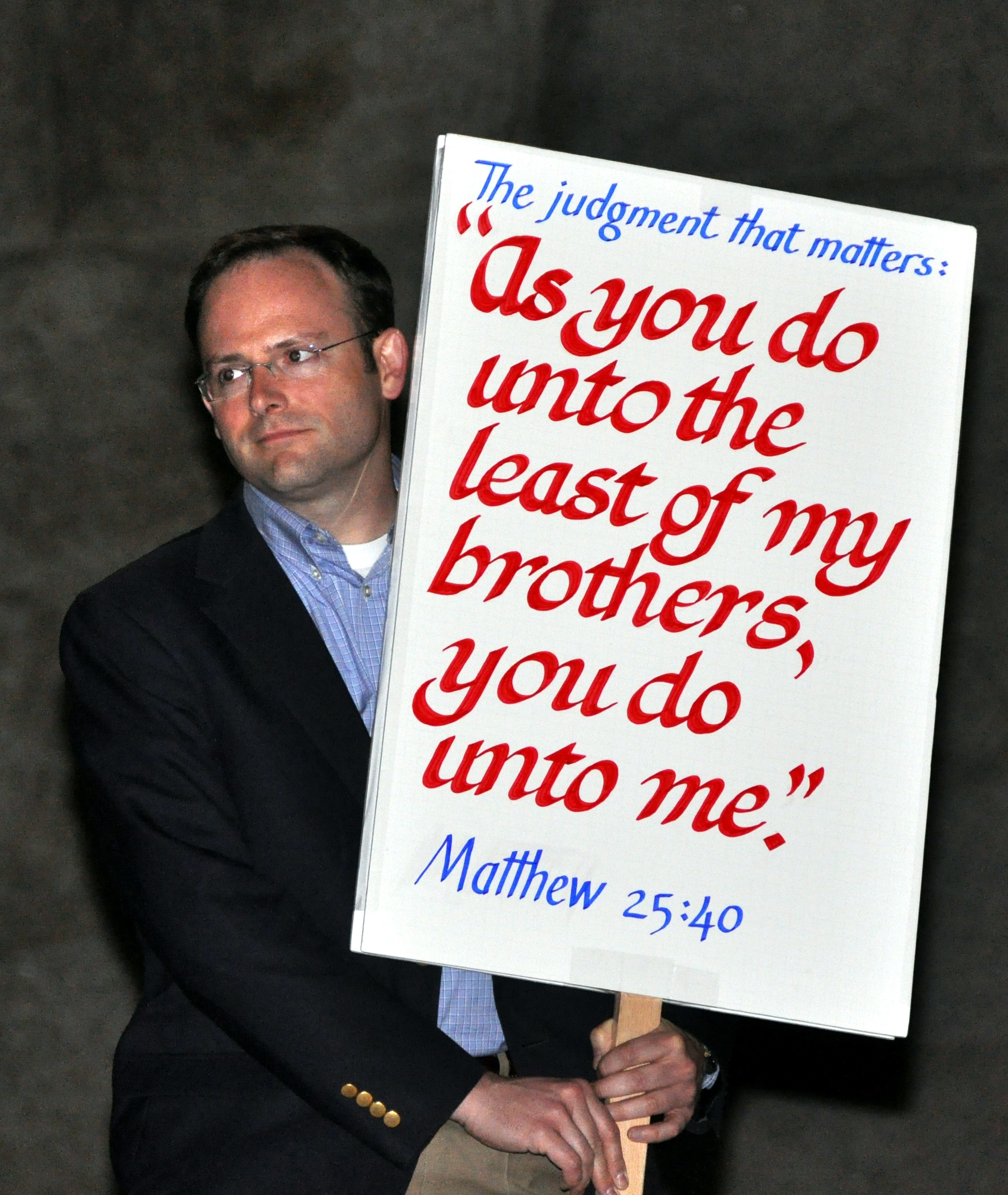
Christian protester at the Utah State Capitol, holding a sign citing Matthew 25:40 as evidence against the morality of the death penalty

Christian tradition from the New Testament have come to a range of conclusions about the permissibility and social value of capital punishment. While some Christians hold the view that a strict reading of certain texts forbids executions, other Christians point to various verses in the New Testament which seem to endorse the imposition of the death penalty. That the principal figure in Christianity, Jesus of Nazareth, is believed by Christians to have been the incarnate God who was executed as a martyr by the Roman Empire influences the opinions pertaining to the death penalty.

Many early Christians strongly opposed the death penalty. A church order from Rome dated to around 200 AD forbids any Christian magistrate from carrying out a death sentence under pain of excommunication. It was also forbidden for any Christian to accuse a person of a crime if that accusation might result in the person being put to death or beaten with lead-weighted leather thongs. In the fifth century, Christian attitudes towards the death penalty gradually became less stringent. In 405, Pope Innocent I ruled that magistrates who enforced the death penalty could not be excommunicated, although the custom was probably still regarded as immoral.

=== Roman Catholic Church ===
The position of the Catholic Church on capital punishment has varied throughout the centuries, with the Church becoming increasingly and explicitly more critical of the practice since the mid-20th century. The Catholic Church generally moved away from explicit condoning or support of capital punishment and has adopted a more disapproving stance on the issue, especially by the mid-20th century.

Historically and traditionally, however, the Church has at certain times (and often cautiously) condoned and classified capital punishment as a form of "lawful slaying", a view which was defended by theological authorities such as Thomas Aquinas. (See also Aquinas on the death penalty). At various times in the past, the Church has held the view that, in certain cases, a legal system may be justified in levying a death sentence, such as in cases where the sentence may deter crime, may protect society from potential future acts of violence by an offender, may bring retribution for an offender's wrongful acts, and may even help the offender to move closer to reconciliation with God in the face of death. The 1566 Roman Catechism states this teaching thus:

Another kind of lawful slaying belongs to the civil authorities, to whom is entrusted power of life and death, by the legal and judicious exercise of which they punish the guilty and protect the innocent. The just use of this power, far from involving the crime of murder, is an act of paramount obedience to this Commandment which prohibits murder. The end of the Commandment is the preservation and security of human life. Now the punishments inflicted by the civil authority, which are the legitimate avengers of crime, naturally tend to this end, since they give security to life by repressing outrage and violence. Hence these words of David: In the morning I put to death all the wicked of the land, that I might cut off all the workers of iniquity from the city of the Lord.

Earlier forms of this teaching were evident to some extent in the writings of Pope Innocent I and Pope Innocent III, though caution was advised in the death penalty's implementation, with Pope Innocent III stating that "the secular power can without mortal sin carry out a sentence of death, provided it proceeds in imposing the penalty not from hatred but with judgment, not carelessly but with due solicitude."

More recently, the 1911 edition of the Catholic Encyclopedia suggested that, in regard to murderers, Catholics can potentially decide for themselves, based on the situation, whether capital punishment is appropriate and should understand or hold that "the infliction of capital punishment is not [necessarily] contrary to the teaching of the Catholic Church, and the power of the State to visit upon culprits the penalty of death derives much authority from revelation and from the writings of theologians"; however, the Catholic Encyclopedia warned that "the advisability of exercising that power is, of course, an affair to be determined upon other and various considerations." In an address given on 14 September 1952, Pope Pius XII stated that the Church does not necessarily regard the execution of murderers as a violation by the State of the universal right to life, declaring: "When it is a question of the execution of a condemned man, the State does not dispose of the individual's right to life. In this case it is reserved to the public power to deprive the condemned person of the enjoyment of life in expiation of his crime when, by his crime, he has already disposed himself of his right to live.”

In the late twentieth century, however, the Catholic Church began to generally move away from condoning the death penalty and instead began to increasingly adopt a more disapproving stance on the issue. Many modern Church figures such as Pope John Paul II, Pope Francis, and the United States Conference of Catholic Bishops have actively discouraged the death penalty or advocated its outright abolition. For example, in his 1995 Evangelium Vitae, Pope John Paul II suggested that capital punishment should be avoided unless it is the only way to defend society from the offender in question, opining that:

[T]he nature and extent of the punishment must be carefully evaluated and decided upon, and ought not go to the extreme of executing the offender except in cases of absolute necessity: in other words, when it would not be possible otherwise to defend society. Today however, as a result of steady improvements in the organisation of the penal system, such cases are very rare, if not practically non-existent."

The 1999 edition of the Catechism of the Catholic Church restated this view, and further stated that:

Assuming that the guilty party's identity and responsibility have been fully determined, the traditional teaching of the Church does not exclude recourse to the death penalty if this is the only possible way of effectively defending human lives against the unjust aggressor. If, however, non-lethal means are sufficient to defend and protect people's safety from the aggressor, authority will limit itself to such means, as these are more in keeping with the concrete conditions of the common good and more in conformity to the dignity of the human person.

However, in 2004, Cardinal Ratzinger (later Pope Benedict XVI) suggested that the assessment of the contemporary situation advanced by John Paul II was not necessarily binding on the faithful, arguing that:

If a Catholic were to be at odds with the Holy Father (i.e., the Pope) on the application of capital punishment or on the decision to wage war, he would not for that reason be considered unworthy to present himself to receive Holy Communion. While the Church exhorts civil authorities to seek peace, not war, and to exercise discretion and mercy in imposing punishment on criminals, it may still be permissible to take up arms to repel an aggressor or to have recourse to capital punishment. There may be a legitimate diversity of opinion even among Catholics about waging war and applying the death penalty, but not however with regard to abortion and euthanasia.

Some Catholic writers, such as the late Cardinal Joseph Bernadin of Chicago, have argued against the use of the death penalty in modern times by drawing on a stance labelled the "consistent life ethic." Characteristic of this approach is an emphasis on the sanctity of human life, and the responsibility on both a personal and social level to protect and preserve life from "womb to tomb" (conception to natural death). This position draws on the conviction that God has "boundless love for every person, regardless of human merit or worthiness." Other Catholic writers, such as Joseph Sobran and Matt Abbott, have criticised this approach, contending that it minimises the issue of abortion by placing it on the same level as the death penalty – the latter of which the Church does not consider intrinsically immoral.

In 2015, Pope Francis stated in an address to the International Commission against the Death Penalty that: "Today the death penalty is inadmissible, no matter how serious the crime committed." Francis argued that the death penalty is no longer justified by a society's need to defend itself and has lost all legitimacy due to the possibility of judicial error. He further stated that capital punishment is an offense "against the inviolability of life and the dignity of the human person, which contradicts God's plan for man and society" and "does not render justice to the victims, but rather fosters vengeance." In the address, Francis further explained:

In certain circumstances, when hostilities are underway, a measured reaction is necessary in order to prevent the aggressor from causing harm, and the need to neutralize the aggressor may result in his elimination; it is a case of legitimate defence (cf. Evangelium Vitae, n. 55). Nevertheless, the prerequisites of legitimate personal defence are not applicable in the social sphere without the risk of distortion. In fact, when the death penalty is applied, people are killed not for current acts of aggression, but for offences committed in the past. Moreover, it is applied to people whose capacity to cause harm is not current, but has already been neutralized, and who are deprived of their freedom. [...]

For a constitutional State the death penalty represents a failure, because it obliges the State to kill in the name of justice [...] Justice is never reached by killing a human being. [...] The death penalty loses all legitimacy due to the defective selectivity of the criminal justice system and in the face of the possibility of judicial error. Human justice is imperfect, and the failure to recognize its fallibility can transform it into a source of injustice. With the application of capital punishment, the person sentenced is denied the possibility to make amends or to repent of the harm done; the possibility of confession, with which man expresses his inner conversion; and of contrition, the means of repentance and atonement, in order to reach the encounter with the merciful and healing love of God. Furthermore, capital punishment is a frequent practice to which totalitarian regimes and fanatical groups resort, for the extermination of political dissidents, minorities, and every individual labelled as “dangerous” or who might be perceived as a threat to their power or to the attainment of their objectives. As in the first centuries and also in the current one, the Church suffers from the application of this penalty to her new martyrs.

The death penalty is contrary to the meaning of humanitas and to divine mercy, which must be models for human justice. It entails cruel, inhumane and degrading treatment, as is the anguish before the moment of execution and the terrible suspense between the issuing of the sentence and the execution of the penalty, a form of “torture” which, in the name of correct procedure, tends to last many years, and which oftentimes leads to illness and insanity on death row.

Shortly prior to Francis's address, the Vatican had officially given support to a 2015 United Nations campaign against the death penalty. During a U.N. Human Rights Council meeting concerning the abolishment of capital punishment, Archbishop Silvano Tomasi declared that "The Holy See Delegation fully supports the efforts to abolish the use of the death penalty." The Archbishop stated:

Considering the practical circumstances found in most States ... it appears evident nowadays that means other than the death penalty 'are sufficient to defend human lives against an aggressor and to protect public order and the safety of persons [...] We should take into account that no clear positive effect of deterrence results from the application of the death penalty and that the irreversibility of this punishment does not allow for eventual corrections in the case of wrongful convictions.

On 2 August 2018, Pope Francis changed Catechism of the Catholic Church 2267 to the following:

Recourse to the death penalty on the part of legitimate authority, following a fair trial, was long considered an appropriate response to the gravity of certain crimes and an acceptable, albeit extreme, means of safeguarding the common good.

Today, however, there is an increasing awareness that the dignity of the person is not lost even after the commission of very serious crimes. In addition, a new understanding has emerged of the significance of penal sanctions imposed by the state. Lastly, more effective systems of detention have been developed, which ensure the due protection of citizens but, at the same time, do not definitively deprive the guilty of the possibility of redemption.

Consequently, the Church teaches, in the light of the Gospel, that “the death penalty is inadmissible because it is an attack on the inviolability and dignity of the person”, and she works with determination for its abolition worldwide.”

=== Eastern Orthodox ===
Various Eastern Orthodox churches have issued statements opposing capital punishment, including the Holy Synod of the Russian Orthodox Church, the Orthodox Church in America, the Greek Orthodox Church, and the Georgian Orthodox Church.

=== Coptic Orthodox ===
The Coptic Orthodox Church approves of fair capital punishment. They believe that the new testament has spoken about grace, love and justice, while at the same time suggesting that capital punishment is justifiable as God's justice for people who take the life of others.

=== Methodists ===
In 1956, the United Methodist Church was one of the first Protestant Christian denomination to make a statement opposing capital punishment. At the United Methodist General Council, church leaders released a statement saying, "We stand for the application of the redemptive principle to the treatment of offenders against the law, to reform of penal and correctional methods, and to criminal court procedures. We deplore the use of capital punishment." The church stands by this statement today.

=== The Salvation Army ===
A positional statement outlines that The Salvation Army does not support the death penalty:

The Salvation Army believes in the sanctity of all human life. It considers each person to be of infinite value, and each life a gift from God to be cherished, nurtured and preserved.

The Army believes that forgiveness and transformation are possible for each human being, regardless of his / her past. Christ's death is redemptive for all who have faith, making it possible for the worst of offenders to find new life in Christ Jesus if they are truly repentant. Long experience in rendering service within the criminal justice systems of many lands, and in ministering to both offenders and victims, and to their respective families, has confirmed the Army's belief in the possibility of forgiveness and redemption for all through repentance toward God, faith in Jesus Christ, and regeneration by the Holy Spirit.

Because of these beliefs, it would be inconsistent for the Army to support efforts to continue or restore capital punishment. While agreeing that wrongdoing should be adequately dealt with, Salvationists do not support the death penalty.

=== Anglican and Episcopalian ===
Article 37 of the Thirty-Nine Articles states that

The Laws of the Realm may punish Christian men with death, for heinous and grievous offences.

The Lambeth Conference of Anglican and Episcopalian bishops condemned the death penalty in 1988:

This Conference: ... 3. Urges the Church to speak out against: ... (b) all governments who practise capital punishment, and encourages them to find alternative ways of sentencing offenders so that the divine dignity of every human being is respected and yet justice is pursued;....

Before that date, Anglican Bishops in the House of Lords had tended to vote in favour of the retention of capital punishment.

=== The Southern Baptist Convention ===
In 2000 the Southern Baptist Convention updated Baptist Faith and Message. In it the convention officially sanctioned the use of capital punishment by the State. This was an extension of earlier church sentiment. It said that it is the duty of the state to execute those who are guilty of murder and God established capital punishment in the Noahic Covenant (Genesis 9:6).

=== Other Protestants ===
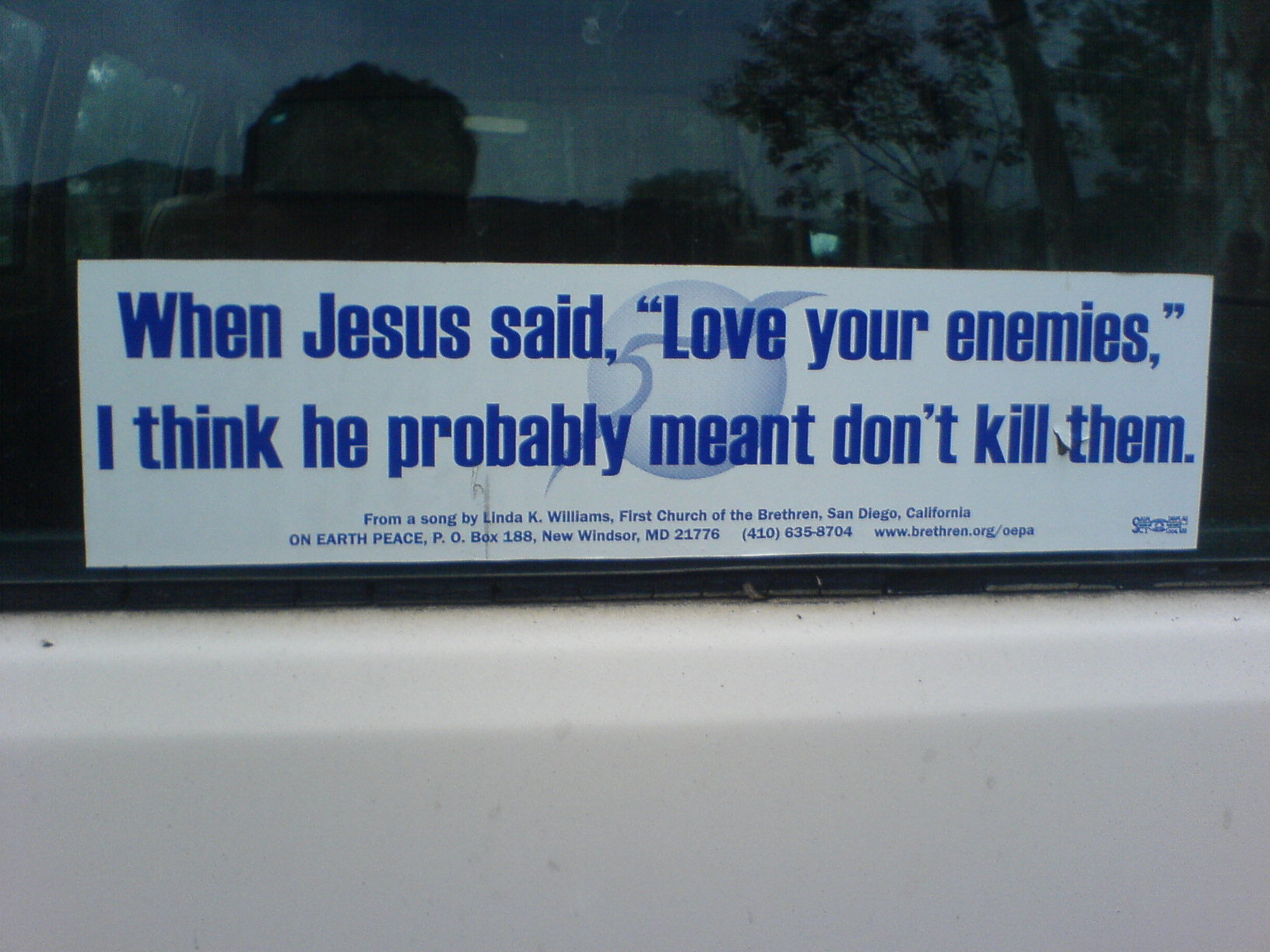

Early in the Protestant Reformation, several of its key leaders, including Martin Luther and John Calvin, followed the traditional reasoning in favour of capital punishment, and the Lutheran Church's Augsburg Confession explicitly defended it. Some Protestant groups have cited Genesis 9:5–6, Romans 13:3–4, and Leviticus 20:1–27 as the basis for permitting the death penalty. However, Martin Luther thought it was wrong to use the death penalty against heretics. This was one of the specific issues he was asked to recant on in 1520 and excommunicated when he did not in 1521. Furthermore, some verses can be cited where Jesus seems to be a legalist by advocating respect for religious and civil laws: Matthew 5:17-22, 22:17-21 (the famous phrase ″Give therefore to Caesar the things that are Caesar's, and to God the things that are God's″, separating religion and civil law) and John 8:10-11. In the Book of Revelation 2:23, words attributed to Jesus explicitly gave to him the power to give death and judge people's "reins and hearts".

Mennonites, Church of the Brethren and Friends have opposed the death penalty since their founding, and continue to be strongly opposed to it today. These groups, along with other Christians opposed to capital punishment, have cited Christ's Sermon on the Mount (transcribed in Matthew Chapter 5–7) and Sermon on the Plain (transcribed in Luke 6:17–49). In both sermons, Christ tells his followers to turn the other cheek and to love their enemies, which these groups believe mandates nonviolence, including opposition to the death penalty.

The World Council of Churches, which many major protestant churches are a member of, explicitly condemned the death penalty in 1990.

=== The Church of Jesus Christ of Latter-day Saints ===
The Church of Jesus Christ of Latter-day Saints (LDS Church) currently takes no position on capital punishment. There are statements from church officials on blood atonement. This belief held that the blood of Jesus' Atonement could not remit certain serious sins, and that the only way an LDS sinner could pay for committing such sins would be to have his own blood spilled on the ground as an atonement. This doctrine was never held by the church or practiced by clergy in their official capacity. The doctrine has no relation as to the reason why, until recently, Utah gave convicts sentenced to death a choice to be executed by firing squad rather than other methods such as lethal injection. This issue received significant public attention when Ronnie Lee Gardner, who was convicted of robbery, murder, and escaping from jail, chose to die by firing squad, citing the blood atonement as the reason for his decision. On the night of Gardner's execution, the LDS Church released a statement that it did not support blood atonement of individuals as a doctrine of salvation.

== Islam ==
Many Islamic governments support capital punishment. Many Islamic nations have governments that are directly run by the code of Sharia and, therefore, Islam is the only known religion which has a direct impact on governmental policies with regard to capital punishment in modern times. Islamic law is often used in the court system of many Islamic countries where there is no separation of church and state. The Quran is viewed as the direct word of Allah and going against its teachings is seen as going against the whole basis of the law. The Quran states "Do not kill a soul which Allah has made sacred except through the process of due law," which means that the death penalty is allowed in certain cases where the law says it is necessary. The Quran explicitly states that the taking of a life results in the taking of one's own. According to the Quran, the death penalty is recognized as a necessary form of punishment for some "Hudud" crimes in Islam, because it is believed that these acts go directly against the word of Allah and are seen as a threat to society. However, in pre-modern Islam, capital punishments for these crimes were rarely enforced because the evidentiary standards were so high as to make convictions more difficult to obtain. At times the enforcement of these laws by modern Islamic governments has been a source of minor controversy within Muslim communities.

=== Islamic nations ===
Among the 57 member states of the Organization of Islamic Cooperation (OIC), the death penalty has been fully abolished in 20 states (35%), with one more country (2%) retaining the option only for wartime offenses. An additional 11 countries (19%) theoretically retain the death penalty option but have not conducted an execution in the past ten years (as of 2026), leaving only 25 OIC members (44%) as active practitioners of capital punishment.

The UN has voiced concern about the sudden increase in death sentences in Iran since 2014. Although Iran has been called upon to stop its frequent use of the death penalty, a total of 625 executions were carried out in 2013 alone. Many of these executions were for drug-related crimes, "enmity against God", and threatening national security. In a controversial case, an Iranian woman named Reyhaneh Jabbari was hanged in Tehran in October 2014 for the murder of a man who she claimed attempted to rape her. Her sentence was supported by the concept of qisas, which is found in the Quran. The term qisas is translated as "equality in retaliation," meaning that any injury inflicted on another should be compensated for by punishing the perpetrator with the same injury.

=== Fatwas and Jihad ===
A fatwa is a legal ruling issued by an Islamic legal expert that addresses the allowance or prohibition of a certain act. Fatwas promoting violence, in which a cleric sanctions an individual or a group of people to kill, are found only in Islam, among major religions. Some fatwas are based on the concept of jihad, which is defined by radicals as a military conflict that must be waged on an individual basis by all healthy adult males. This idea becomes relevant in military struggles between Muslims and non-believers in which Muslims are not permitted to flee. The necessity to fight is viewed as an act of faith to Allah and those who remain loyal to Allah are rewarded. Ancient Islamic law lays out 36 conditions under which jihads can be waged, of which around 10-14 are military-related. Other forms of jihad include personal struggles with the evil implications of one's soul or wealth. Current military motivations for Jihad might originate with the idea that Islam can only be spread through violence, although the modern world includes other methods by which Islam can be spread such as the mass media and the internet.

Traditionally, fatwas must identify the legal problem which is being addressed, consider other rulings regarding the issue, and lay out a clear guidelines on how to solve the problem. Fatwas need to be based on many sources such as the Qur'an, the sunnah, logical analogies, public interest, and necessity. Questions have been raised about a Muslim who follows a fatwa that causes him to sin, particularly in cases of violence. This falls back on the cleric who issued the fatwa and the person who committed the potential crime. This has led to radical interpretations that legitimize killing in order to fulfill a fatwa. An example of this includes Islamic terrorism, which is based on the belief that "the meaning of jihad is to strive to liberate Muslim lands from the grip of kuffars who usurped them and imposed their own laws on them instead of the laws of Allah." Fatwas have been issued against the West by radicals within the Muslim community who claim that the West's governments practice heresy and world domination. An example of this is the fatwa issued by Sheikh Abdallah 'Azzam who called for an ongoing jihad "until all of mankind worships Allah." This resulted in a fatwa which ruled that the killing of all non-believers was a duty that must be fulfilled by all Muslims as a response to the Soviet invasion of Afghanistan in 1979. Another example is a fatwa issued by the well-known Islamic religious leader Yusuf al-Qaradawi against the Libyan dictator Muammar Gaddafi in February 2011. In the fatwa, which he issued on Al-Jazeera television, he stated that "whoever in the Libyan army is able to shoot a bullet at Mr. Gaddafi should do so".

== Judaism ==
The teachings of Judaism support the imposition of the death penalty in principle but the standard of proof which is required for the imposition of the death penalty is extremely stringent, and in practice, it has been abolished by various Talmudic decisions, making the situations in which a death sentence can be imposed effectively impossible and hypothetical. "Forty years before the destruction" of the Temple in Jerusalem in 70 CE, i.e. in 30 CE, the Sanhedrin effectively abolished capital punishment, making it a hypothetical upper limit on the severity of punishment, fitting in finality for God alone to use, not fallible humans.

Even though Judaism allows the death penalty to be imposed in some hypothetical circumstances, scholars of Judaism broadly oppose the death penalty as it is imposed in the modern world. The Jewish understanding of Biblical law is not based on a literal reading of the Bible, instead, it is seen through the lens of Judaism's oral law. These oral laws were first recorded in the Mishnah in around 200 CE and later, in around 600 CE, they were recorded in the Babylonian Talmud. The laws clearly state that the death penalty was rarely imposed. The Mishnah states:

A Sanhedrin that puts a man to death once in seven years is called destructive. Rabbi Eliezer ben Azariah says: a Sanhedrin that puts a man to death even once in seventy years. Rabbi Akiba and Rabbi Tarfon say: Had we been in the Sanhedrin none would ever have been put to death. Rabban Simeon ben Gamaliel says: they would have multiplied shedders of blood in Israel. (Mishnah, Makkot 1:10).

Rabbinic tradition describes a detailed system of checks and balances which exists in order to prevent the execution of an innocent person. These rules are so restrictive as to effectively legislate the penalty out of existence. The law requires that:

- There must have been two witnesses to the crime, and these must conform to a prescribed list of criteria. For example, females and close relatives of the criminal are precluded from being witnesses according to Biblical law, while full-time gamblers are precluded as a matter of rabbinical law.
- The witnesses must have verbally warned the person seconds before the act that they were liable for the death penalty
- The person must then have verbally acknowledged that he or she was warned and that the warning would be disregarded, and then have gone ahead and committed the sin.
- No individual was allowed to testify against him or herself.

The 12th-century Jewish legal scholar Maimonides famously stated that "It is better and more satisfactory to acquit a thousand guilty persons than to put a single innocent one to death." Maimonides argued that executing a defendant on anything less than absolute certainty would lead to a slippery slope of decreasing burdens of proof, until we would be convicting merely "according to the judge's caprice." Maimonides was concerned about the need for the law to guard itself in public perceptions, to preserve its majesty and retain the people's respect. On the other hand, he allowed for the possibility of imposing capital punishment on circumstantial evidence alone when warranted.

Today, the State of Israel only uses the death penalty for extraordinary crimes, and only two people have ever been executed in Israel's history. The only civil execution ever to take place in Israel was of convicted Nazi war criminal Adolf Eichmann in 1962. The other execution was of Meir Tobianski, an army major court-martialled and convicted of treason during the 1948 Arab–Israeli War, and posthumously exonerated. However, Israeli employment of the death penalty has little to do with Jewish law.

=== Orthodox Judaism ===
In Orthodox Judaism it is held that in theory the death penalty is a correct and just punishment for some crimes. However, in practice the application of such a punishment can only be carried out by humans whose system of justice is nearly perfect, a situation which has not existed for some time.

Orthodox Rabbi Yosef Edelstein writes

"So, at least theoretically, the Torah can be said to be pro-capital punishment. It is not morally wrong, in absolute terms, to put a murderer to death. However, things look rather different when we turn our attention to the practical realisation of this seemingly harsh legislation. You may be aware that it was exceedingly difficult, in practice, to carry out the death penalty in Jewish society. I think it's clear that with regard to Jewish jurisprudence, the capital punishment outlined by the Written and Oral Torah, and as carried out by the greatest Sages from among our people (who were paragons of humility and humanity and not just scholarship, needless to say), did not remotely resemble the death penalty in modern America (or Texas). In theory, capital punishment is kosher; it's morally right, in the Torah's eyes. But we have seen that there was great concern—expressed both in the legislation of the Torah, and in the sentiments of some of our great Sages—regarding its practical implementation. It was carried out in ancient Israel, but only with great difficulty. Once in seven years; not 135 in five and a half." (Rabbi Yosef Edelstein, Director of the Savannah Kollel)

Orthodox Rabbi Aryeh Kaplan writes:

"In practice, however, these punishments were almost never invoked, and existed mainly as a deterrent and to indicate the seriousness of the sins for which they were prescribed. The rules of evidence and other safeguards that the Torah provides to protect the accused made it all but impossible to actually invoke these penalties...the system of judicial punishments could become brutal and barbaric unless administered in an atmosphere of the highest morality and piety. When these standards declined among the Jewish people, the Sanhedrin...voluntarily abolished this system of penalties." (Rabbi Aryeh Kaplan in Handbook of Jewish Thought, Volume II, pp. 170–71).

On the other hand, Rabbi Moshe Feinstein, in a letter to then New York Governor Hugh Carey states: "One who murders because the prohibition to kill is meaningless to him and he is especially cruel, and so too when murderers and evil people proliferate they [the courts] would [should?] judge [capital punishment] to repair the issue [and] to prevent murder – for this [action of the court] saves the state."

=== Conservative Judaism ===
In Conservative Judaism the death penalty was the subject of a responsum by its Committee on Jewish Law and Standards:

"The Talmud ruled out the admissibility of circumstantial evidence in cases which involved a capital crime. Two witnesses were required to testify that they saw the action with their own eyes. A man could not be found guilty of a capital crime through his own confession or through the testimony of immediate members of his family. The rabbis demanded a condition of cool premeditation in the act of crime before they would sanction the death penalty; the specific test on which they insisted was that the criminal be warned prior to the crime, and that the criminal indicate by responding to the warning, that he is fully aware of his deed, but that he is determined to go through with it. In effect this did away with the application of the death penalty. The rabbis were aware of this, and they declared openly that they found capital punishment repugnant to them... There is another reason which argues for the abolition of capital punishment. It is the fact of human fallibility. Too often we learn of people who were convicted of crimes and only later are new facts uncovered by which their innocence is established. The doors of the jail can be opened, in such cases we can partially undo the injustice. But the dead cannot be brought back to life again. We regard all forms of capital punishment as barbaric and obsolete..."

=== Reform Judaism ===
Reform Judaism has formally opposed the death penalty since 1959, when the Union of American Hebrew Congregations (now the Union for Reform Judaism) resolved “that in the light of modern scientific knowledge and concepts of humanity, the resort to or continuation of capital punishment either by a state or by the national government is no longer morally justifiable.” The resolution goes on to say that the death penalty “lies as a stain upon civilization and our religious conscience.” In 1979, the Central Conference of American Rabbis, the professional arm of the Reform rabbinate, resolved that, “both in concept and in practice, Jewish tradition found capital punishment repugnant” and there is no persuasive evidence “that capital punishment serves as a deterrent to crime.”

== Hinduism ==
Even though Hinduism has historically not taken a stance on the death penalty and it has little influence on the Indian governments opinion of it, India (an 80% Hindu nation) has the lowest rate of execution of any other country. A basis can be found in Hindu teachings, such as the Mahabharata, for opposing the death penalty, even though it has historically been implemented by Hindu leaders. Hinduism preaches ahimsa (or ahinsa, non-violence), but also teaches that the soul cannot be killed and death is limited only to the physical body, explaining the difficulty in choosing an exact position on capital punishment.

Hinduism's belief that life in this world is more of an illusion greatly decreases the religious impact on governments in majority Hindu nations. Use of the death penalty has not faced much opposition by Indian citizens historically, with the exception of some recent backlash. Hinduism's belief in karma may explain why there is no strong support or opposition to capital punishment because it is believed that if someone commits a crime in this life, they will pay for it in another life. It is also believed that the soul comes back many times after death to be purified by good karma and a person's destiny determines when they die.

=== Evidence in support of the death penalty ===
Historically, The Laws of Manu, or manusmriti, state that the king should be the one to decide on appropriate punishments. The king has the right to do whatever needs to be done in order to protect his people. He is given the right to punish criminals by placing them in shackles, imprisoning them, or sentencing them to death. It was observed in the 5th century that death sentences were related to caste. For example, If a Sudra insulted a priest they were sentenced to death but if a priest were to kill a sudra it was the equivalent of killing a dog or a cat and their only punishment would be to pay a fine. Other crimes worthy of capital or corporal punishment, according to the Laws of Manu, include when a lower caste man has sex with a woman of the highest caste, a Sudra slandering a Kshatriya, when men and women are stolen from the most noble family, and when a woman is violated without consent. With a history of rulers who favored capital punishment, Ashoka is the only known ruler to openly oppose its use.

In the 1980s parliament expanded punishment by death to offenses such as terrorism and kidnapping for ransom. This decision was supported by the public and a survey conducted in the 1980s solidified this support in finding that teachers, doctors, and lawyers all favored the death penalty. Currently, the Indian Penal Code (IPC) recognizes legitimacy of the death penalty in cases of murder, waging war against the government, encouraging suicide, fabricating false evidence, kidnapping, and murder as part of a robbery. Today, It is common to find people in support of the death penalty such as Kiran Bedi, Police Advisor to the UN, who says that "the death penalty is necessary in certain cases to do justice to society's anger against the crime." An example of recent capital punishment in India includes Mohammad Afzal Guru, who was sentenced to death in 2013 after attacking the Indian Parliament in December 2001.

=== Evidence in opposition to the death penalty ===
Emperor Ashoka, who was a Buddhist, was one of the first rulers to completely outlaw the imposition of capital punishment. He outlawed the imposition of capital punishment because he believed in Buddhism's strong emphasis on ahimsa, or nonviolence. In Buddhism, and also in Hinduism, the concept of ahimsa bans the killing of any living being, no matter how small. Many people who oppose the death penalty go back to the beliefs of their enlightened ancestors who preached non-violence and that we should respect human rights and the gift of life. Gandhi also opposed the death penalty and stated that "I cannot in all conscience agree to anyone being sent to the gallows. God alone can take life because he alone gives it." In 1980, the Indian Supreme Court made it very clear that it does not take capital punishment lightly and as a result of Bachan Singh v. State of Punjab ruled that the death penalty should only be utilized in the "rarest of rare cases." Currently, it is mainly only human rights activists that take a stand against the death penalty. This is because they believe that the only people being sentenced to death are "the poor, the sick, and the ignorant." Also vulnerable are the non-Hindu minorities, who feel threatened by the idea of the death penalty and oppose it. Although it is unclear whether a sample of Indian college students is representative of the whole population, Lambert found that when asked their opinion of the death penalty 44% of college students opposed it. However, when taking into account the importance of religion in their lives there was a significant relationship between religious affiliation and support for the death penalty.

== Summary of worldwide denominational positions ==
Affirm capital punishment	No clear/official position	Oppose capital punishment
American Carpatho-Russian Orthodox Diocese American Evangelical Christian Churches Association of Reformed Baptist Churches of America Baháʼí Faith Christian Reformed Church Conservative Baptist Association of America Conservative Congregational Christian Conference Evangelical Association Evangelical Presbyterian Church Free Methodist Churches General Association of Regular Baptist Churches Islamic Society of North America Lutheran Church–Missouri Synod Nation of Islam Orthodox Presbyterian Church Russian Orthodox Church Outside Russia Separate Baptists in Christ Southern Baptist Convention	Assemblies of God Church of Jesus Christ of Latter-day Saints (Mormons) Church of the Nazarene Hinduism Jehovah's Witnesses National Baptist Convention, USA Reformed Episcopal Church Seventh-day Adventist Church	African Methodist Episcopal Church African Methodist Episcopal Zion Church American Association of Lutheran Churches American Baptist Association American Baptist Churches USA American Unitarian Association Anglican Catholic Church Anglican Church in America Apostolic Christian Church of America Apostolic Lutheran Church of America Association of Free Lutheran Congregations Augustana Catholic Church Brethren in Christ Church Christian Methodist Episcopal Church Church of All Worlds Catholic Church Christian Church (Disciples of Christ) Church of the Brethren Church of God (Cleveland, Tennessee) Church of God of Prophecy Church of the Lutheran Brethren of America Church of the Lutheran Confession Church of South India Church of Sweden Church of the United Brethren in Christ Community of Christ Creation Seventh Day Adventist Church Episcopal Church Episcopal Missionary Church Evangelical Covenant Church Evangelical Friends Church International Evangelical Lutheran Church in America Evangelical Mennonite Conference Foursquare Church Greek Orthodox Archdiocese of America Mennonite Brethren Church Mennonite Church USA Methodist Church in Britain Moravian Church in North America Old Roman Catholic Church in America Orthodox-Catholic Church of America Orthodox Church in America Union for Reform Judaism United Synagogue of Conservative Judaism Presbyterian Church (USA) Primitive Baptist Church Primitive Methodist Church in the USA Reformed Church in America Rosedale Network of Churches Society of Friends (Quakers) Southern Episcopal Church Swedenborgian Church of North America The Salvation Army Unitarian Universalist Association United Church of Christ United Methodist Church

== See also ==
- Outline of capital punishment
- Auto-da-fé
- Christian pacifism
- Death penalty in the Bible
- Eight precepts
- Five precepts
- Religious violence
- Seven Laws of Noah
- The Bible and violence
- Thou shalt not kill
- Turning the other cheek

== Notes ==
- For a detailed discussion on the Roman Catholic Church's view on capital punishment, see chapter 3 of Pope John Paul II's encyclical, Evangelium Vitae.
