= LaGrand case =

Legal action

The LaGrand case was a legal action heard before the International Court of Justice (ICJ) which concerned the Vienna Convention on Consular Relations. In the case, the ICJ ruled that its own temporary court orders were legally binding and that the rights contained in the convention could not be denied by the application of domestic legal procedures.

On January 7, 1982, brothers Karl-Heinz LaGrand (1963–1999) and Walter Bernhard LaGrand (1962–1999) bungled an armed bank robbery in Marana, Arizona, killing 63-year-old Kenneth Hartsock by stabbing him 24 times with a letter opener, and severely injuring 20-year-old Dawn Lopez by stabbing her multiple times. Lopez later said she heard one of the brothers twice say, "Just make sure he's dead." They were subsequently charged and convicted of murder and sentenced to death. The LaGrands also had prior convictions for robbery and burglary, which were used against them during the sentencing phase of their trials.

== Background ==
Karl-Heinz LaGrand
- Born: October 20, 1963; Augsburg, West Germany
- Died: February 24, 1999 (aged 35); Florence State Prison, Arizona, U.S.
- Status: Executed by lethal injection
- Convictions: First degree murder Attempted first degree murder Kidnapping (5 counts); Attempted armed robbery Armed robbery (2 counts); Aggravated assault
- Penalty: Death

Details
- Victims: 1
- Date: January 7, 1982
- Locations: Marana, Arizona, U.S.
- Weapon: Letter opener

Walter Bernhard LaGrand
- Born: January 26, 1962; Augsburg, West Germany
- Died: March 3, 1999 (aged 37); Florence State Prison, Arizona, U.S.
- Status: Executed by gas chamber
- Convictions: First degree murder Attempted first degree murder Kidnapping (5 counts); Attempted aggravated robbery Attempted armed robbery Armed robbery (2 counts); Aggravated assault Third degree burglary
- Penalty: Death

Details
- Victims: 1
- Date: January 7, 1982
- Locations: Marana, Arizona, U.S.
- Weapon: Letter opener

On January 7, 1982, brothers Karl-Heinz LaGrand (1963–1999) and Walter Bernhard LaGrand (1962–1999) bungled an armed bank robbery in Marana, Arizona, killing 63-year-old Kenneth Hartsock by stabbing him 24 times with a letter opener, and severely injuring 20-year-old Dawn Lopez by stabbing her multiple times. Lopez later said she heard one of the brothers twice say, "Just make sure he's dead." They were subsequently charged and convicted of murder and sentenced to death. The LaGrands also had prior convictions for robbery and burglary, which were used against them during the sentencing phase of their trials.

The LaGrands were German nationals, having been born in Germany to a German mother. While they had both lived in the United States since they were four and five, respectively, neither had obtained U.S. citizenship. As foreigners, the LaGrands should have been informed of their right to consular assistance, under the Vienna Convention, from their state of nationality, Germany. However, the Arizona authorities failed to do this. The brothers later contacted Consul William Behrens, head of the German Consulate in Phoenix, on their own accord, having learned of their right to consular assistance. They appealed their sentences and convictions on the grounds that they were not informed of their right to consular assistance, and that with consular assistance they might have been able to mount a better defense. The federal courts rejected their argument on grounds of procedural default, which provides that issues cannot be raised in federal court appeals unless they had first been raised in state courts.

Diplomatic efforts, including pleas by German Ambassador Jürgen Chrobog and German Member of Parliament Claudia Roth, and the recommendation of Arizona's clemency board, failed to sway Arizona Governor Jane Dee Hull, who insisted that the executions be carried out. Karl LaGrand was executed on February 24, 1999, by lethal injection. Walter LaGrand was executed March 3, 1999, by lethal gas (upon his request).

== Case ==
Germany initiated legal action in the International Court of Justice against the United States regarding Walter LaGrand. Hours before Walter LaGrand was due to be executed, Germany applied for the Court to grant a provisional court order, requiring the United States to delay the execution of Walter LaGrand, which the court granted.

Germany then initiated action in the U.S. Supreme Court for enforcement of the provisional order. In its judgment, the U.S. Supreme Court held that it lacked jurisdiction with respect to Germany's complaint against Arizona due to the Eleventh Amendment of the U.S. constitution, which prohibits federal courts from hearing lawsuits of foreign states against a U.S. state. With respect to Germany's case against the United States, it held that the doctrine of procedural default was not incompatible with the Vienna Convention, and that even if procedural default did conflict with the Vienna Convention it had been overruled by later federal law – the Antiterrorism and Effective Death Penalty Act of 1996, which explicitly legislated the doctrine of procedural default. (Subsequent federal legislation overrides prior self-executing treaty provisions, Whitney v. Robertson, 124 U.S. 190 (1888)).

The U.S. Solicitor General sent a letter to the Supreme Court, as part of these proceedings, arguing that provisional measures of the International Court of Justice are not legally binding. The United States Department of State also conveyed the ICJ's provisional measure to the Governor of Arizona without comment. The Arizona clemency board recommended a stay to the governor, on the basis of the pending ICJ case; but the Governor of Arizona, Jane Dee Hull, ignored the recommendation.

Germany then modified its complaint in the case before the ICJ, alleging furthermore that the U.S. violated international law by failing to implement the provisional measures. In opposition to the German submissions, the United States argued that the Vienna Convention did not grant rights to individuals but only to states; that the convention was meant to be exercised subject to the laws of each state party, which in the case of the United States meant subject to the doctrine of procedural default; and that Germany was seeking to turn the ICJ into an international court of criminal appeal.

== ICJ decision ==
On June 27, 2001, the ICJ, rejecting all of the United States' arguments, ruled in favor of Germany. The ICJ held that the Vienna Convention on Consular Relations of April 24, 1963, granted rights to individuals on the basis of its plain meaning, and that domestic laws could not limit the rights of the accused under the convention, but only specify the means by which those rights were to be exercised. The ICJ also found that its own provisional measures were legally binding.

The court also found that the United States violated the Vienna Convention through its application of procedural default. The court was at pains to point out that it was not passing judgment on the doctrine itself, but only its application to cases involving the Vienna Convention.

== See also ==
- Capital punishment in Arizona
- List of people executed in Arizona
- List of people executed in the United States in 1999
- Avena case
- Leal Garcia v. Texas (2011)
- Linda Carty
- List of United States Supreme Court cases, volume 526
