= Breard v. Greene =

- Supreme Court of the United States

Decided April 14, 1998
- Full case name: Ángel Francisco Breard v. Fred W. Greene, Warden
- Citations: 523 U.S. 371 (more) 118 S. Ct. 1352; 140 L. Ed. 2d 529; 1998 U.S. LEXIS 2465; 66 U.S.L.W. 3684; 98 Cal. Daily Op. Service 2948; 98 Daily Journal DAR 3979; 1998 Colo. J. C.A.R. 1947; 11 Fla. L. Weekly Fed. S 458

Holding
- Defendant could not raise his Vienna Convention claim on federal habeas corpus review. He could not have demonstrated that the alleged violation of the Vienna Convention had an effect on his state trial that ought to have resulted in the overturning of his conviction. The Vienna Convention did not clearly provide a foreign nation with a private right of action in U.S. courts.

Court membership
- Chief Justice William Rehnquist Associate Justices John P. Stevens · Sandra Day O'Connor; Antonin Scalia · Anthony Kennedy; David Souter · Clarence Thomas; Ruth Bader Ginsburg · Stephen Breyer

Case opinions
- Per curiam
- Concurrence: Souter
- Dissent: Stevens
- Dissent: Breyer
- Dissent: Ginsburg

Laws applied
- Vienna Convention on Consular Relations

Breard v. Greene, 523 U.S. 371 (1998), is a United States Supreme Court decision decided on April 14, 1998. The Court held that Ángel Francisco Breard would not receive a stay of execution and/or other relief under the Vienna Convention on Consular Relations, thus confirming the constitutional law principle that a Senate-ratified treaty may be overridden by a later domestic statute enacted by Congress.

== Background ==
In 1992, Ángel Francisco Breard, a citizen of Paraguay, was convicted of the rape and capital murder of Ruth Dickie. Breard was scheduled to be executed by the Commonwealth of Virginia in 1996. Ultimately, Breard filed a motion for habeas relief in Federal District Court, alleging that arresting authorities violated the Vienna Convention on Consular Relations when they failed to inform him that, as a foreign national, he had the right to contact the Paraguayan Consulate. The court concluded that Breard had procedurally defaulted on this claim by failing to raise it in state court. The Court of Appeals affirmed. In 1996, Paraguayan officials brought suit alleging that Virginia officials had violated their rights under the Vienna Convention by failing to inform Breard of his treaty rights and the Paraguayan consulate of Breard's situation. Ultimately, the District Court concluded that it lacked jurisdiction. The Court of Appeals affirmed.

In a per curiam opinion, the Court denied the stay applications and all other relief. The majority of the Court concluded that, because he had procedurally defaulted it, Breard could not raise his Vienna Convention claim on federal habeas corpus review. Moreover, the Court reasoned that Breard could not have demonstrated that the alleged violation of the Vienna Convention had an effect on his state trial that ought to have resulted in the overturning of his conviction. Additionally, the Court found that the Vienna Convention did not clearly provide a foreign nation with a private right of action in U.S. courts. Justices John Paul Stevens, Ruth Bader Ginsburg, and Stephen Breyer, in separate dissents, argued that the Court ought to have granted the stay applications and considered the merits of the case to different degrees.

== Aftermath ==
Shortly after this decision, Ángel Francisco Breard was executed by lethal injection administered by the Commonwealth of Virginia on April 14, 1998, aged 32.

== See also ==
- List of United States Supreme Court cases, volume 523
- List of United States Supreme Court cases
- Lists of United States Supreme Court cases by volume
- Sanchez-Llamas v. Oregon (2006)
- Medellin v. Texas (2008)

General:

- Capital punishment in Virginia
- Capital punishment in the United States
- List of people executed in Virginia
- List of people executed in the United States in 1998
