= Leal Garcia v. Texas =

- Supreme Court of the United States

Decided July 7, 2011
- Full case name: Leal Garcia v. Texas
- Docket no.: 11-5001
- Citations: 564 U.S. 940 (more) 131 S. Ct. 2866; 180 L. Ed. 2d 872; 2011 U.S. LEXIS 5019

Case history
- Prior: Application for stay and on petition for writ of certiorari to the United States Court of Appeals for the Fifth Circuit

Holding
- Courts cannot stay an execution on the basis of the then possibility that Congress will, in the future, enact a statute to enforce an international law.

Court membership
- Chief Justice John Roberts Associate Justices Antonin Scalia · Anthony Kennedy; Clarence Thomas · Ruth Bader Ginsburg; Stephen Breyer · Samuel Alito; Sonia Sotomayor · Elena Kagan

Case opinions
- Per curiam
- Dissent: Breyer, joined by Ginsburg, Sotomayor, Kagan

Leal Garcia v. Texas, 564 U.S. 940 (2011), was a ruling in which the Supreme Court of the United States denied Humberto Leal García's application for stay of execution and application for writ of habeas corpus. Leal was subsequently executed by lethal injection. The central issue was not Leal's guilt, but rather that he was not notified of his right to call his consulate as required by international law. The Court did not stay the execution because Congress had never enacted legislation regarding this provision of international law. The ruling attracted a great deal of commentary and Leal's case was supported by attorneys specializing in international law and several former United States diplomats.

== Background ==
Leal García was a Mexican national who kidnapped, raped, and killed a 16-year-old girl. He was arrested, convicted, and sentenced to death. Citing Concerning Avena and Other Mexican Nationals, a decision by the International Court of Justice, Leal argued that his conviction was obtained in violation of the Vienna Convention on Consular Relations. Specifically, Leal argued that the United States had violated the Vienna Convention by failing to notify him that he had the right to call his consulate. Leal and the United States asked the Supreme Court to stay his execution so that Congress could consider legislation to implement the Avena decision.

The Court previously ruled in Medellín v. Texas that international legal obligations are not binding unless Congress enacts them in a statute. Thus the primary focus of Leal's Supreme Court appeal was a bill introduced by Senator Patrick Leahy that would enact the obligations of the Vienna Convention as law (henceforth referred to as Avena legislation).

== Opinion ==
The opinion of the Court was delivered per curiam. First, the Court considered Leal's claim that executing him while 'Avena' legislation was under consideration violated due process. The Court rejected this claim, stating that due process does not prevent a State from carrying out a lawful judgment in light of unenacted legislation. Second, the Court considered an argument by the United States which claimed that the Court should issue a stay in execution so that the Court could issue a ruling after the 'Avena' legislation had passed. The Court rejected this argument, holding that the Court is tasked with ruling with the law at present, not what it might become in the future. Further, the Court expressed its skepticism that such legislation would ever be enacted. Having rejected all arguments, the Court denied Leal's application for stay of execution and application for writ of habeas corpus.

=== Dissent ===
Associate Justice Stephen Breyer dissented, joined by Justice Ginsburg, Justice Sotomayor, and Justice Kagan. Breyer held that a stay would be appropriate. Breyer drew a distinction between Medellín v. Texas and Leal's case, noting that the Court had refused to grant a stay of execution in Medellín in significant part because the President had not told the Court there would be likely congressional action. Breyer pointed out that in Leal's case congressional action was a reasonable possibility. Further, Breyer argued that under Federal Trade Commission v. Dean Foods Co., the Court could take action to preserve its future jurisdiction that would result upon Congress passing the Avena legislation.

Breyer also argued that the Court should defer to the executive branch, per the President's constitutionally based authority in matters of foreign relations.

== See also ==
- Avena case
- LaGrand case
