= Avena case =

ICJ Court Case

Case Concerning Avena and Other Mexican Nationals (Mexico v. United States of America)
- Court: International Court of Justice
- Decided: 31 March 2004
- Citations: Judgment, I.C.J. Reports 2004, 12; General List No. 128

Court membership
- Judges sitting: Shi Jiuyong (President); Raymond Ranjeva (Vice-President); Gilbert Guillaume; Abdul Koroma; Vladlen Vereschetin; Rosalyn Higgins; Gonzalo Parra Aranguren; Pieter Kooijmans; Francisco Rezek; Awn Al-Khasawneh; Thomas Buergenthal; Nabil Elaraby; Hisashi Owada; Peter Tomka; Bernardo Sepúlveda Amor (ad hoc)

Case opinions
- Declaration: Shi Jiuyong; Declaration: Raymond Ranjeva; Separate Opinion: Vladlen Vereschetin; Separate Opinion: Gonzalo Parra Aranguren; Separate Opinion: Peter Tomka; Separate Opinion: Bernardo Sepúlveda Amor

The Case Concerning Avena and Other Mexican Nationals (Mexico v. United States of America), more commonly the Avena case (French: Affaire Avena), was a case heard before the International Court of Justice (ICJ). In its judgment of 31 March 2004, the Court found that the United States had breached its obligations under the Vienna Convention on Consular Relations in not allowing legal representation from the Mexican consulate to meet with Mexican citizens arrested and imprisoned for crimes in the United States.

An order indicating provisional measures in the case of Mr. José Ernesto Medellín Rojas was entered on 16 July 2008, and on 19 January 2009, the ICJ found that the United States breached its obligations under the 16 July order, but also that the Statute of the International Court of Justice "does not allow it to consider possible violations of the Judgment which it is called upon to interpret."

In the subsequent domestic American litigation in Medellín v. Texas, the United States Supreme Court (the court of last resort concerning federal rights and international obligations) held that the Congress had not implemented laws to enable redress of violations of the Vienna Convention on Consular Relations, or to enable enforcement of decisions of the International Court of Justice, and hence the President of the United States could not do so.

== Summary ==
On 9 January 2003, Mexico filed a lawsuit against the United States of America, accusing the US of violating the Vienna Convention on Consular Relations by arresting, detaining, trying, convicting, and sentencing 54 Mexican nationals to death row without allowing Mexico its international legal obligations in accordance with Articles 5 and 36 of the Vienna Convention. In light of the violation committed by the United States, Mexico demanded that the US restore the status quo ante and take the necessary steps to ensure that the rights afforded under Article 36 are provided. Mexico also submitted a request to the court indicating provisional measures of protection in order to protect the rights of its citizens after the final judgment in the case, including that the government of the United States must ensure that no Mexican national be executed or have an execution date set.

The United States admitted that in certain cases, Mexican nationals have been prosecuted and sentenced without being informed of their rights, but in other cases, in accordance with the ICJ's judgment in the LaGrand case, the US had an obligation "by means of its own choosing, (to) allow the review and consideration of the conviction and sentence by taking account of the violation of the rights set forth in that Convention." In those cases, review and reconsideration had already occurred throughout the last two years. The US also pointed out that if the court granted Mexico's request to halt execution for its nationals, it would install a sweeping prohibition on capital punishment in the United States for any and all Mexican nationals, thus interfering in the US's sovereign rights and would "transform the court into a general criminal court of appeal".

Of the 54 cases presented to the court, three were most focused upon. Three Mexican nationals, César Roberto Fierro Reyna, Roberto Moreno Ramos, and Osvaldo Torres Aguilera were at risk of execution in the next few months or possibly weeks. The court recognized that their execution would cause irreparable prejudice and implemented provisional measures by prohibiting the United States to proceed with their execution pending the final judgment in the case.

At the beginning of the proceedings, the United States raised several objections over the jurisdiction of the court as well as admissibility, each dismissed by the court as being a matter for the merits. In the first of Mexico's submissions, it asked the court to declare that:

the United States of America, in arresting, detaining, trying, convicting, and sentencing the 52 Mexican nationals on death row described in Mexico's Memorial, violated its international legal obligations to Mexico, in its own right and in the exercise of its right to diplomatic protection of its nationals, by failing to inform, without delay, the 52 Mexican nationals after their arrest of their right to consular notification and access under Article 36(1)(b) of the Vienna Convention on Consular Relations, and by depriving Mexico of its right to provide consular protection and the 52 nationals' right to receive such protection as Mexico would provide under Article 36 (1)(a) and (c) of the Convention.

There were two major issues under Article 36 that were being disputed by the two parties: the question of the nationalities of the individuals being executed as well as the meaning of the phrase "without delay".

The court wanted Mexico to produce proof that each of the individuals presented in the case held Mexican nationality at the time of their arrest, such as birth certificates or declarations of nationality, which would not be challenged by the United States. The US in turn had to produce proof that showed the persons of Mexican nationality were also United States citizens. In closer examination of the cases, the court revealed that in 45 of them, there was no evidence that the arrested individual claimed US nationality or were reasonably thought to be US nationals. Of the seven remaining cases, Mexico failed to prove a violation in only one. In another case, the court found that the individual was informed of their rights under Article 36 but had declined to have his consular post notified.

After months of debate, the court concluded that in 51 of the cases, excluding those of César Roberto Fierro Reyna, Roberto Moreno Ramos, and Osvaldo Torres Aguilera, the United States had breached their obligation as set forth under Article 36 paragraph 1 of the Vienna Convention on Consular Relations by not informing the appropriate Mexican consular post without delay. By not doing so, the US had also deprived Mexico of the right to provide assistance to its nationals. In regards to César Roberto Fierro Reyna, Roberto Moreno Ramos, and Osvaldo Torres Aguilera, by not allowing a review and reconsideration of their convictions and sentences, the United States also violated Article 36, paragraph 2 of the convention. As reparation in this case, the United States of America was ordered to provide review and reconsideration of convictions and sentences of the Mexican nationals and implement specific measures to ensure non-repetition.

== See also ==
- Medellín v. Texas
- Leal Garcia v. Texas
- List of International Court of Justice cases
