= Decoy effect =

Phenomenon in marketing

Adding a decoy may affect consumer preference

In marketing, the decoy effect (or attraction effect or asymmetric dominance effect) is a phenomenon in consumer decision-making in which the inclusion of unattractive third option can change the perceived preference between the other two. This third option is asymmetrically dominated when it is inferior in all respects to one option; but, in comparison to the other option, it is inferior in some respects and superior in others. In other words, in terms of specific attributes determining preferences, it is completely dominated by (i.e., inferior to) one option and only partially dominated by the other. When the asymmetrically dominated option is present, a higher percentage of consumers will prefer the dominating option than when the asymmetrically dominated option is absent. The asymmetrically dominated option is therefore a decoy serving to increase preference for the dominating option. The decoy effect is also an example of the violation of the independence of irrelevant alternatives axiom of decision theory.

The decoy effect is considered particularly important in choice theory because it is a violation of the assumption of "regularity" present in all axiomatic choice models, for example in a Luce model of choice. Regularity means that it should not be possible for the market share of any alternative to increase when another alternative is added to the choice set. The new alternative should reduce, or at best leave unchanged, the choice share of existing alternatives. Regularity is violated in the example shown below where a new alternative C not only changes the relative shares of A and B but actually increases the share of A in absolute terms. Similarly, the introduction of a new alternative D increases the share of B in absolute terms.

== Examples ==
Suppose there is a consideration set (options to choose from in a menu) that involves smartphones. Consumers will generally see higher storage capacity (number of GB) and lower price as positive attributes; while some consumers may want a device that can store more photos, music, etc., other consumers will want a device that costs less. In Consideration Set 1, two devices are available:

Consideration Set 1
	A	B
price	$400	$300
storage	300GB	200GB

In this case, some consumers will prefer A for its greater storage capacity, while others will prefer B for its lower price.

Now suppose that a new player, C, the "decoy", is added to the market; it is more expensive than both A, the "target", and B, the "competitor", and has more storage than B but less than A:

Consideration Set 2
	A (target)	B (competitor)	C (decoy)
price	$400	$300	$450
storage	300GB	200GB	250GB

The addition of decoy C – which consumers would presumably avoid, given that a lower price can be paid for a model with more storage—causes A, the dominating option, to be chosen more often than if only the two choices in Consideration Set 1 existed; C affects consumer preferences by acting as a basis of comparison for A and B. Because A is better than C in both respects, while B is only partially better than C, more consumers will prefer A now than did before. C is therefore a decoy whose sole purpose is to increase sales of A.

Conversely, suppose that instead of C, a player D is introduced that has less storage than both A and B, and that is more expensive than B but not as expensive as A:

Consideration Set 3
	A (competitor)	B (target)	D (decoy)
price	$400	$300	$350
storage	300GB	200GB	150GB

The result here is similar: consumers will not prefer D, because it is not as good as B in any respect. However, whereas C increased preference for A, D has the opposite effect, increasing preference for B.

Another example shown in Dan Ariely's book Predictably Irrational was a true case used by The Economist magazine. The subscription screen presented three options:

1. Economist.com subscription - US$59.00. One-year subscription to Economist.com. Includes online access to all articles from The Economist since 1997
2. Print subscription - US$125.00. One-year subscription to the print edition of The Economist
3. Print & web subscription - US$125.00. One-year subscription to the print edition of The Economist and online access to all articles from The Economist since 1997

Given these choices, 16% of the students in the experiment conducted by Ariely chose the first option, 0% chose the middle option, and 84% chose the third option. Even though nobody picked the second option, when he removed that option the result was the inverse: 68% of the students picked the online-only option, and 32% chose the print and web option.

== Measurement ==
The decoy effect is usually measured by comparing the frequency of choice of the target, A in the absence of the decoy, C, compared with when the decoy is present in the consideration set. The decoy effect can also be measured as how much more a consumer is ready to pay to choose the target rather than the competitor.

== Debate ==
Some research suggests that the attraction effect does not appear in realistic purchasing scenarios, for example when options are presented graphically, or when the target and the competitor are not exactly of the same value.

The original authors had to underline again that the attraction effect occurs only if the consumer is close to indifference between the target and the competitor, if both dimensions of the products (in our example, price and storage capacity) are about as important as each other to the consumer, if the decoy is not too undesirable, and if the dominance relation is easy to identify. A recent study has indeed confirmed that the attraction effect persists when options are presented graphically, e.g., as scatter plots.

== See also ==
- Independence of irrelevant alternatives
- List of cognitive biases
- Menu dependence
- Context effect
