= Murders of Jennifer Ertman and Elizabeth Peña =

Child murders and rapes in 1993

- Elizabeth Peña (left) and Jennifer Ertman (right)
- Location: Oak Forest, Houston, Texas, U.S.
- Date: June 24, 1993; 33 years ago
- Attack type: Double murder, child murder, gang rape, child rape, torture murder, kidnapping
- Weapons: Ligatures, belt
- Victims: Jennifer Ertman and Elizabeth Peña
- Perpetrators: Peter Cantu; José Medellín; Derrick Sean O'Brien; Efrain Pérez; Raul Villarreal; Venancio Medellín
- Verdict: All perpetrators guilty on all counts
- Convictions: Capital murder, kidnapping, aggravated sexual assault
- Sentence: Cantu, J. Medellín, O'Brien: Death; Pérez, Villarreal: Death; commuted to life imprisonment with the possibility of parole (after 35 years) (Note: The death sentences of Efrain Pérez and Raul Villarreal were commuted to life imprisonment in 2005, following Roper v. Simmons.); V. Medellín: 40 years' imprisonment

The rape and murder of Jennifer Lee Ertman and Elizabeth Christine Peña, two teenage girls from Houston, Texas, aged 14 and 16, respectively, occurred on June 24, 1993. The murder of the two girls made headlines in Texas newspapers due to the nature of the crime and the new law resulting from the murder that allows families of the victims to view the execution of the murderers. The case was also notable in that the state of Texas rejected attempts by the International Court of Justice to halt the perpetrators' executions.

== Background ==
Elizabeth Christine Peña (June 21, 1977 – June 24, 1993) and Jennifer Lee Ertman (August 15, 1978 – June 24, 1993) were close friends who both attended Waltrip High School.

Although the girls were just over one year in age difference, both sets of parents approved of their friendship, with Peña's father viewing Ertman—a modest girl who had only recently begun experimenting with makeup—as a "positive influence" on his daughter, later recollecting that, shortly after the two became friends at Waltrip High School, Peña "just straightened up her act" following a brief streak of teenage rebellion before her 1992 enrollment at the school.

=== June 24, 1993 ===
At 4:15 p.m. on June 24, 1993, Ertman's father, Randy, drove his daughter to Peña's home. At approximately 8 p.m., Peña's mother, Melissa, drove the two girls to the home of their friend Gina Escamilla, who lived in the Spring Hill Apartments and who was hosting a pool party for her school friends. As both girls exited the car, Peña assured her mother she and her friend would be home by their agreed 11:30 p.m. curfew.

When the pair realized they were going to be late returning home, they decided to leave the party to conform to the curfew both had promised their parents.

Ertman and Peña decided to take a 10-minute shortcut to Peña's residence in Oak Forest by following the railroad tracks and passing through T.C. Jester Park. This location was approximately one mile from Peña's home.

=== Gang initiation ===
The girls were walking along White Oak Bayou when they encountered six gang members drinking beer shortly after the gang initiation ceremony of 17-year-old Raul Villarreal.

Villarreal had no previous history of gang membership but had engaged in this initiation ceremony whereby he had been forced to fight several gang members before they judged whether to accept him. By approximately 10:30 p.m., Villarreal had successfully fought two gang members before being beaten midway through his fight with the third member. As he lay writhing and moaning on the ground after being temporarily knocked unconscious, the gang members conferred privately to discuss whether to accept Villarreal as a member.

Minutes later, the leader of the gang, Peter Cantu, told Villarreal that he had been approved, and Villarreal sat alongside the other gang members, talking and drinking beer.

=== Abduction and assault ===
Within approximately 40 minutes of Villarreal accepting several bottles of beer from the other gang members, Ertman and Peña passed the gang. One member, José Medellín, attempted to grope and pinch one of Peña's breasts; Peña brushed aside Medellín's hand and continued walking. In response, Medellín stated: "No, baby! Where [are] you going?" He then clasped his arm around Peña's neck, threw her to the ground, and dragged her down a gravel decline in the direction of the other gang members as Peña screamed and pleaded for help. She was then forced to remove her underwear. (Note: Minutes before Peña and Ertman encountered these gang members, two other gang members, twins Frank and Ramon Sandoval, had participated in Villarreal's initiation ceremony. Although only one of the brothers had fought Villarreal, both had left the initiation ceremony minutes before both girls were abducted. Both had observed Peña and Ertman's abduction, initial assault, and screams for help. Neither attempted to prevent the assaults or to inform the police.)

Ertman could have likely ran to escape at this point, but instead ran to help her friend. She was thrown to the ground by gang members Peter Cantu and Derrick Sean O'Brien.

Five of the gang members proceeded to rape both girls repeatedly for more than an hour. (Note: Venancio Medellín did rape Ertman on one occasion.)

== Murders ==
Realizing that the girls would be capable of identifying them, Cantu ordered the members to kill the girls. He told Venancio Medellín to stay behind because he was "too little to watch." The other gang members forced the girls into a wooded area. O'Brien and Villarreal strangled Ertman with O'Brien's belt until it broke, then completed the murder with a shoelace.

Peña attempted to flee. In response, Cantu tackled and repeatedly kicked the girl in her face and body, dislodging three teeth and fracturing several ribs. Cantu, José Medellín, and Pérez then strangled Peña to death with shoelaces.

Leaving the crime scene, Cantu handed Venancio Medellín a Goofy wristwatch taken from Ertman's body, saying, "Take this, I don't want it."

Cantu dropped off José Medellín, Pérez, and Villarreal at his residence, where he lived with his brother, Joe Cantu, and sister-in-law, Christina Cantu. Christina Cantu questioned why Villarreal was bleeding, and Pérez had a bloody shirt. This prompted Medellín to say the gang "had fun" and that details would appear on the news. He, Pérez, and Villarreal then elaborated that they had raped two girls.

Peter Cantu then returned and divided the valuables that had been stolen from the girls. After the gang left, Christina Cantu convinced Joe Cantu to report the crime to the police.

== Discovery ==
Four days after the murders, the girls' bodies were found in the park. Both bodies had significantly decomposed, and dental records were used for identification. The medical examiner corroborated that the cause of death was strangulation. All those believed responsible were ultimately arrested. Medellín gave both written and taped confessions.

== Sentencing and incarceration ==
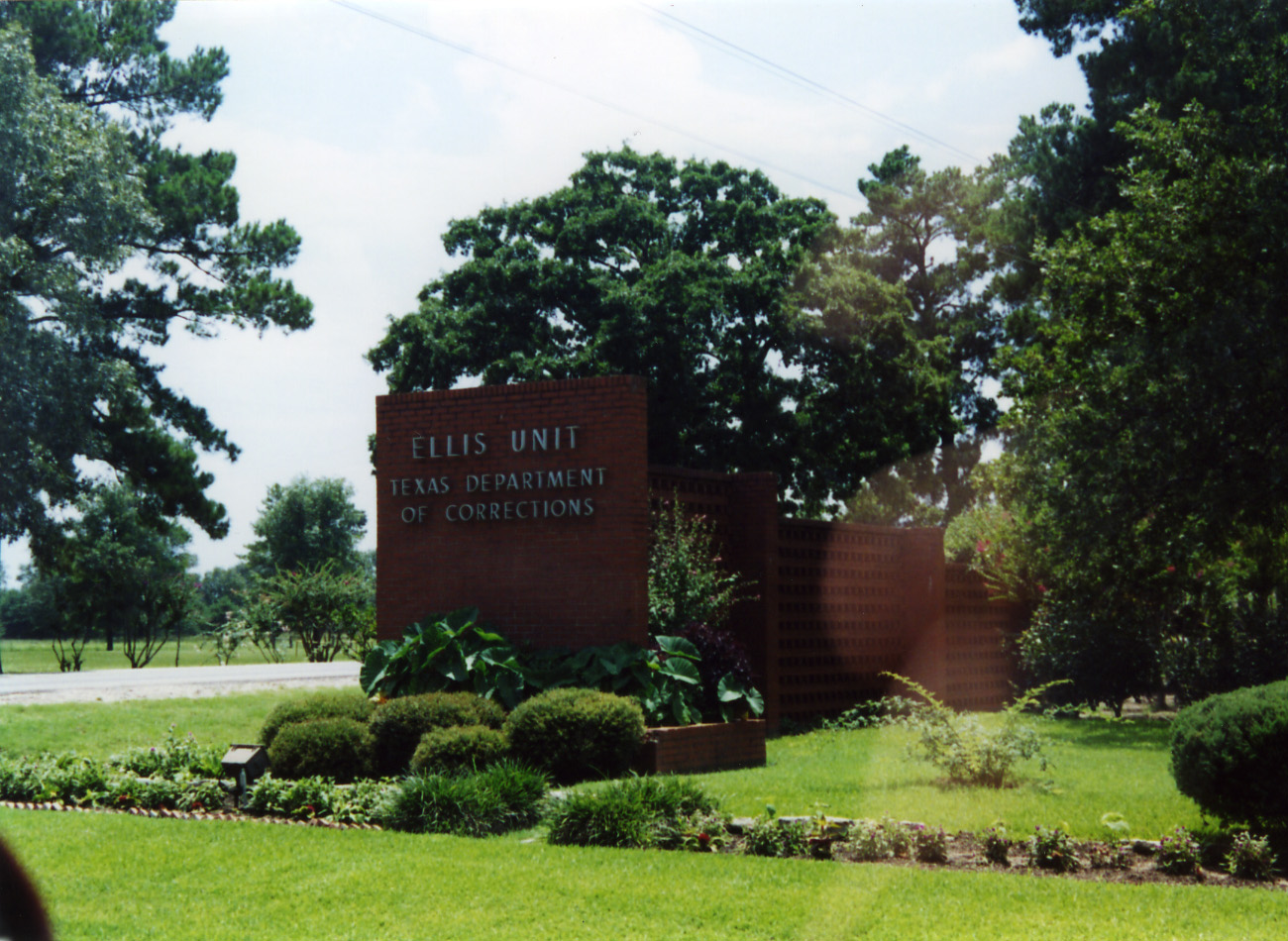
Ellis Unit, where the death row perpetrators were initially confined

At sentencing, the offenders were remanded to the Texas Department of Criminal Justice (TDCJ) system. Peter Anthony Cantu, José Ernesto Medellín, Derrick Sean O'Brien, Efrain Pérez, and Raul Omar Villarreal received death sentences. Venancio Medellín, the brother of José Medellín, testified against everyone except his brother. He received a 40-year prison sentence, the maximum for a juvenile, for the sexual assault of Jennifer Ertman.

Following Roper v. Simmons, when the Supreme Court of the United States banned the executions of people who committed crimes while they were below 18 years of age, the death sentences of Pérez and Villarreal were automatically commuted to life in prison. Pérez will become eligible for parole on October 10, 2029, while Villarreal will become eligible for parole on September 20, 2029.

Cantu, O'Brien, and José Medellín were later implicated in the January 4, 1993, murder of 27-year-old Patricia Lopez. Although none of them were charged (Cantu had already been sentenced to death by the time he was linked to Lopez's murder), Lopez's murder was mentioned at the sentencing phases of O'Brien and Medellín. O'Brien gave a taped confession where he admitted to being at Lopez's murder but was "too drunk to know who did what." A beer can with O'Brien's fingerprint on it was found beneath Lopez's body, while Medellín's DNA was also found to be a match for DNA found at the crime scene.

== Executions ==
Derrick O'Brien was the first to be executed, on July 11, 2006.

Before his execution, O'Brien expressed his regrets for his actions to the families of Peña and Ertman. He then apologized to his family before being executed by lethal injection. In response to accusations from anti-death penalty advocates that capital punishment is a cruel and unusual form of punishment, Peña's father later remarked O'Brien's death had occurred peacefully, "in twenty seconds", adding: "I wish to God that my daughter could have died that easily. Put a needle in her arm and just go to sleep. I wish to hell he could have died the way she died."

José Medellín appealed his execution, saying that he had informed City of Houston and Harris County police officers that he was a Mexican citizen and that he had been unable to confer with Mexican consular officials. The prosecutors said that Medellín never told authorities he was a Mexican citizen. Medellín said in a sworn statement that he learned that the Mexican consulate could assist him in 1997. He petitioned the Texas Court of Criminal Appeals in 1998 regarding this issue; the appeal failed.

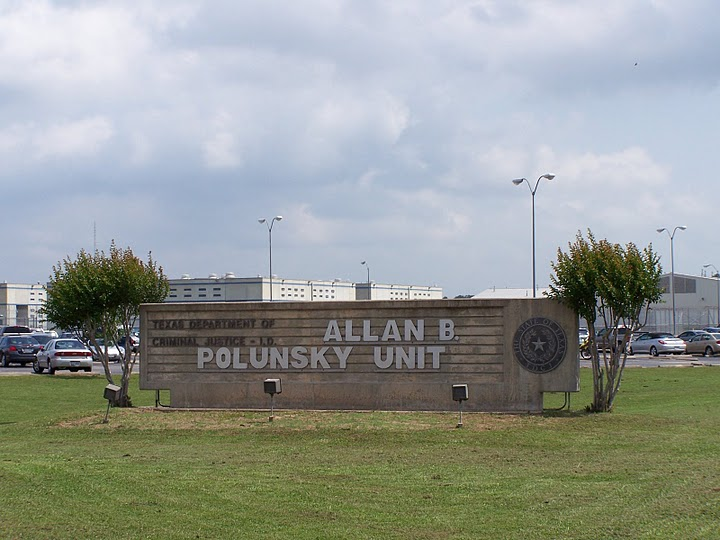
The perpetrators who were under death sentences were later moved to the Allan B. Polunsky Unit.

Medellín's impending execution became an international controversy since the state did not hold a hearing about whether the inability of Medellín to meet with Mexican consular officials harmed his defense. The right of a defendant to talk with his or her consulate is specified in the Vienna Convention on Consular Relations; the United States is a party to the convention, although the U.S. withdrew from compulsory jurisdiction in 1986 to accept the court's jurisdiction only on a case-by-case basis. In 2004, the International Court of Justice (ICJ) responded to a lawsuit filed by Mexico against the United States; the court ordered hearings to be held for inmates, including Medellín, who were denied consular rights.

In 2005, President George W. Bush ordered hearings to be held. The State of Texas, represented by Solicitor General Ted Cruz, challenged Bush's order, and the Supreme Court of the United States ruled that only the Congress of the United States has the right to order hearings to be held. In July, the ICJ ordered a stay of Medellín's execution. Governor Rick Perry argued that Texas is not bound to ICJ rulings. Death penalty opponents protested the impending execution. The families of both Ertman and Peña strongly favored the execution(s).

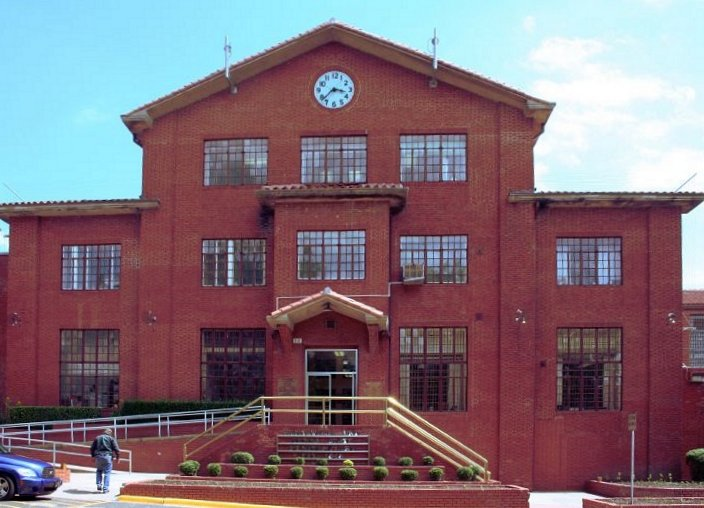
Huntsville Unit, the site of executions in the State of Texas

José Medellín was executed at 9:57 p.m. on August 5, 2008, after his last-minute appeals were rejected by the Supreme Court. Governor Perry rejected calls from Mexico and Washington, D.C., to delay the execution, citing the torture, rape, and strangulation of two teenaged girls in Houston 15 years before as just cause for the death penalty. During his lifetime, Randy Ertman advocated strongly against granting parole to Venancio Medellín.

Seventeen years after the crimes, Peter Anthony Cantu was executed on August 17, 2010. The lethal injection was performed at 6:09 p.m., and at 6:17 p.m., Cantu was officially pronounced dead. He declined to make a final statement before his execution.

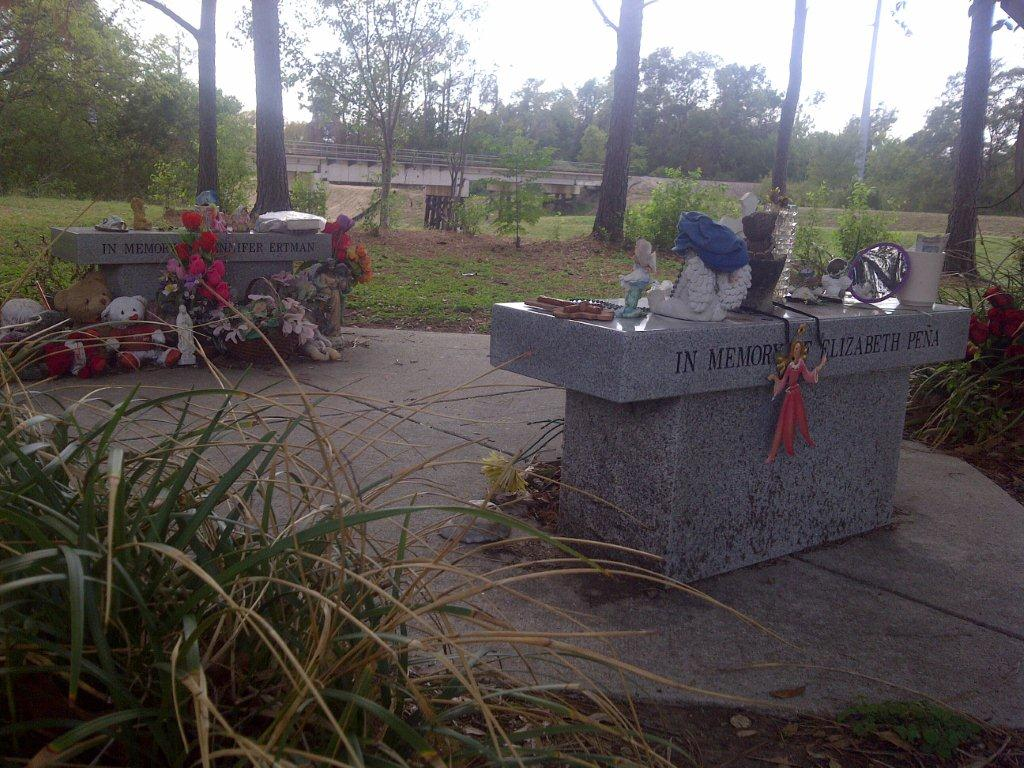
Memorials to Ertman and Peña in TC Jester Park: In the background is the railroad bridge where the two were initially attacked.

Cantu, Medellín, and O'Brien are buried at Captain Joe Byrd Cemetery.

== Aftermath ==
The parents of Peña and Ertman successfully advocated for the State of Texas to allow victims' relatives to have permission to witness executions in Texas. Before the murders, Houston officials had stated that gangs were not a significant issue in the city. C.E. Anderson, a Houston Police Department officer who worked on the murder case, described the murder as "part of the impetus for the antigang programs in Houston." Jennifer Latson of the Houston Chronicle said that the deaths of the girls "shook" the Oak Forest neighborhood of Houston "to its foundation."

Randy Ertman, the father of Jennifer Ertman and victims' rights advocate, died of lung cancer on August 18, 2014. Ertman had wanted to have Andy Kahan, the City of Houston's crime advocate, to witness the executions of O'Brien and Medellín. TDCJ refused to permit Kahan to witness the execution.

The Texas parole board denied parole on several occasions to Venancio Medellín, most recently in 2020. Medellín is scheduled to be released in 2034.

Waltrip High School has a memorial to the girls. Another memorial exists at T.C. Jester Park.

They are both buried at Woodlawn Garden of Memories Cemetery.

== See also ==
- 1995 Okinawa rape incident
- Murder of Carla Walker
- Dean Corll
- Medellín v. Texas
- Capital punishment in Texas
- List of people executed in Texas, 2000–2009
- List of people executed in Texas, 2010–2019
- List of people executed in the United States in 2006
- List of people executed in the United States in 2008
- List of people executed in the United States in 2010
- List of solved missing person cases: 1950–1999
- List of serial killers in the United States

== Cited works and further reading ==
- Mitchell, Corey (2008). Pure Murder. Pinnacle Books. ISBN 978-0-786-01851-2.
