= United Nations Security Council Resolution 457 =

UN Security Council Resolution 457
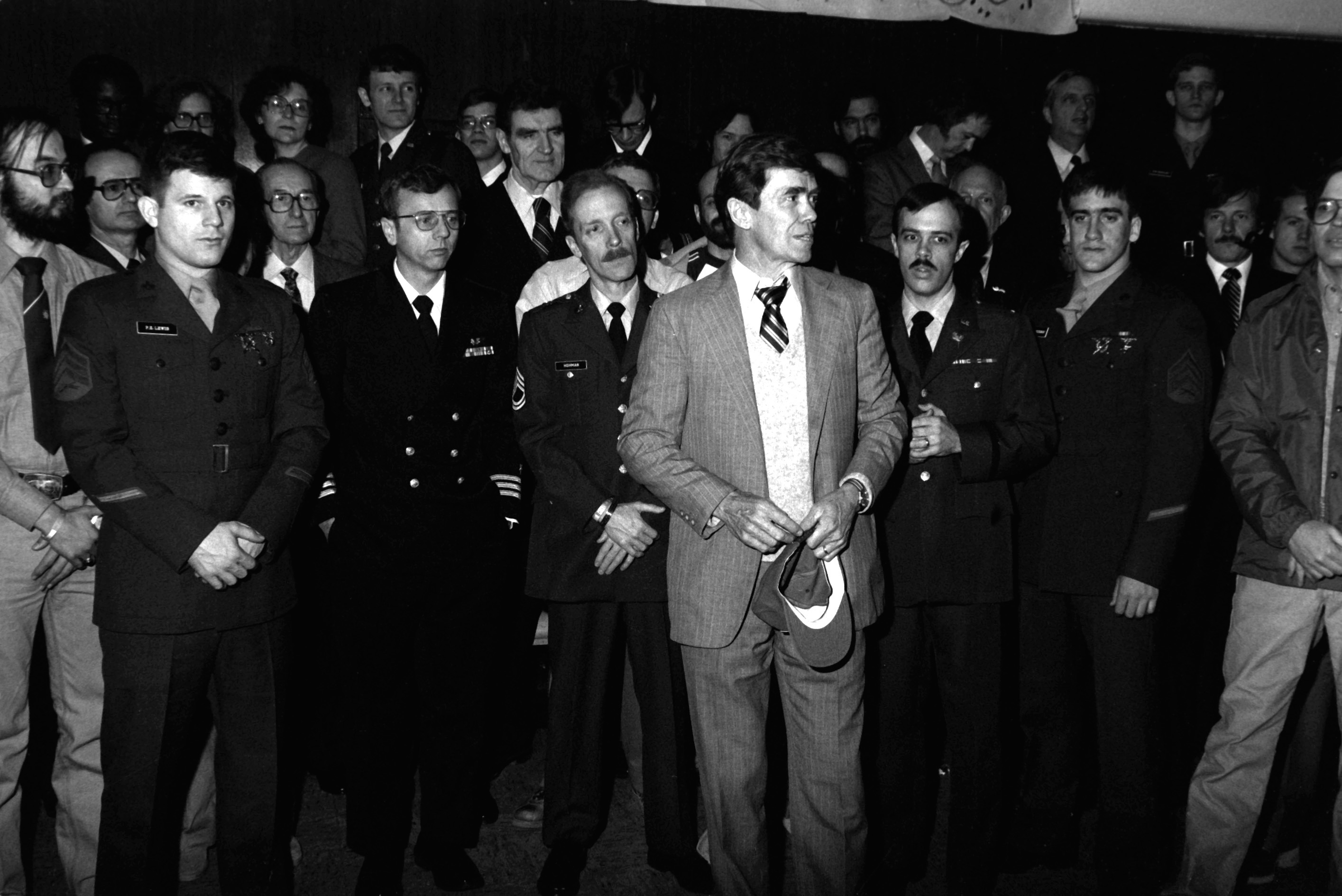
- Former American hostages at hospital
- Date: 4 December 1979
- Meeting no.: 2,178
- Code: S/RES/457 (Document)
- Subject: Islamic Republic of Iran-USA
- Voting summary: 15 voted for; None voted against; None abstained
- Result: Adopted

Security Council composition
- Permanent members: China; France; Soviet Union; United Kingdom; United States
- Non-permanent members: Bangladesh; Bolivia; Czechoslovakia; Gabon; Jamaica; Kuwait; Nigeria; Norway; Portugal; Zambia

United Nations Security Council Resolution 457, adopted unanimously on 4 December 1979, addressed the ongoing Iran hostage crisis. After expressing concern at the level of tensions between Iran and the United States as a potential threat to international security, the Council called on Iran to immediately release hostages held at the American embassy in Tehran and allow them to leave the country. The resolution reminded all Member States to respect the Vienna Convention on Diplomatic Relations and Vienna Convention on Consular Relations, which urged countries to respect the inviolability of diplomatic personnel and the premises of their diplomatic missions.

The Council then called on both countries to settle the disputes between them and exercise utmost restraint in the prevailing situation.

== See also ==
- Iranian Revolution
- Iran – United States relations
- List of United Nations Security Council Resolutions 401 to 500 (1976–1982)
- United Nations Security Council Resolution 461
