= José Medellín =

Mexican murderer (1975–2008)

José Ernesto Medellín Rojas (March 4, 1975 – August 5, 2008), born in Nuevo Laredo, Tamaulipas, was a Mexican national executed by lethal injection for the 1993 murders of Jennifer Ertman and Elizabeth Peña in Houston, Texas.

Medellín was convicted of raping and killing 16-year-old Peña and 14-year-old Ertman on 24 June. He was also linked to the gang-rape and murder of Patricia Lopez on January 4, 1993. While he was never tried in her death, the murder was mentioned at his sentencing hearing.

His case gained notoriety when Mexico sued the United States in the International Court of Justice on behalf of 51 Mexican nationals asserting that the US had violated the Vienna Convention on Consular Relations, which requires that local authorities inform foreign nationals being held on criminal charges of their right to consult with their country's diplomats. That court ruled that the United States was obliged to have the defendants' cases reopened and reconsidered. The Supreme Court of the United States agreed to hear the case on May 1, 2007.

The Bush administration briefed the Supreme Court on the obligation to comply with international treaties. On March 25, 2008, in Medellín v. Texas, the court rejected the Bush administration's arguments and cleared the way for Texas to carry out the execution. The International Court of Justice later ruled that the United States had violated its treaty obligations.

== Rape and murder ==
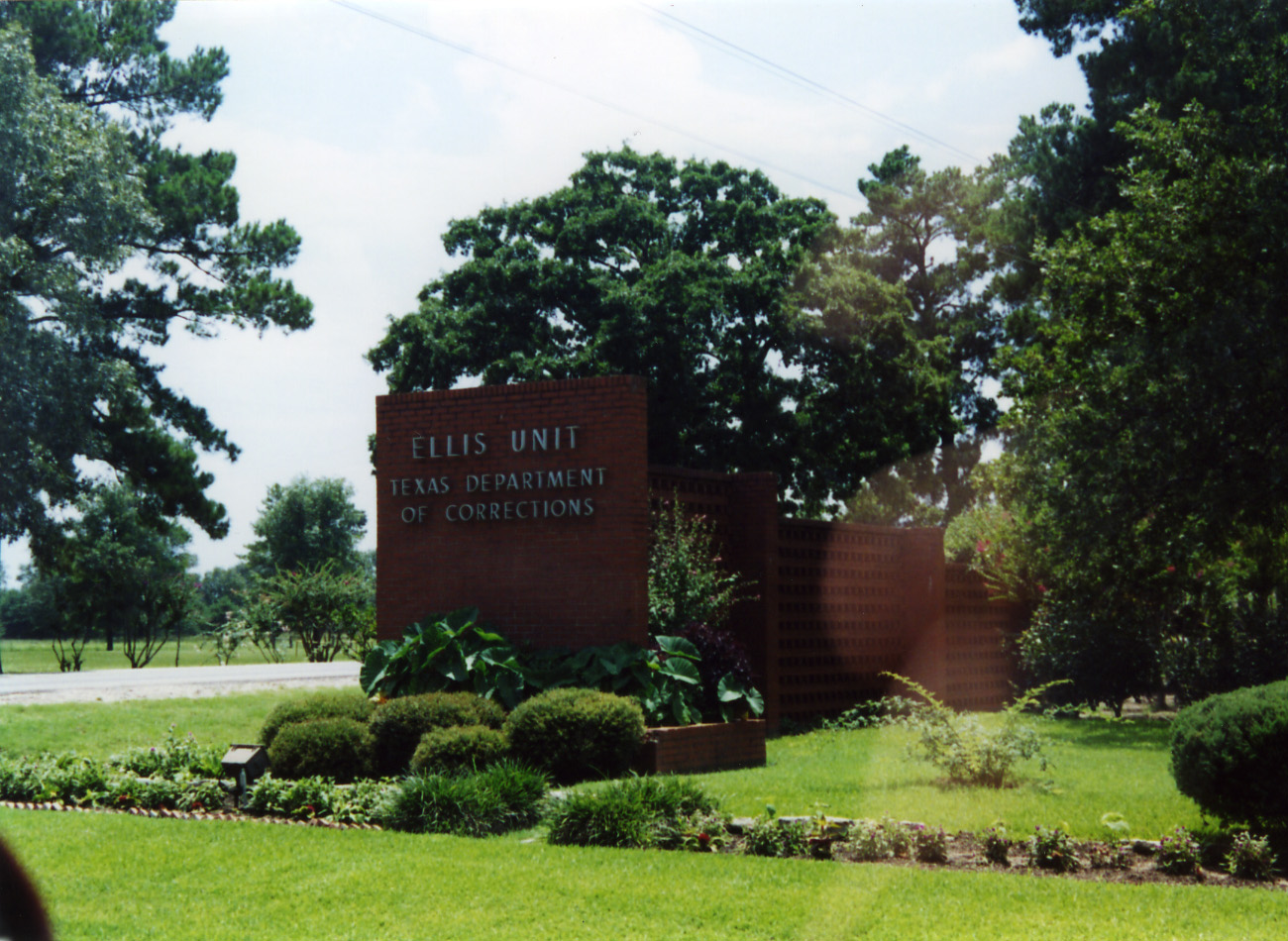
Ellis Unit, where Medellín was initially confined

On June 24, 1993, Medellín carried out a gang initiation at T.C. Jester Park in Houston, Texas, along with five others: Peter Cantu, Ramon Sandoval, Efrain Perez, and Derrick Sean O'Brien. Two others, Frank Sandoval and Venancio Medellín, were present, but did not participate in the initiation. The initiation involved the new member, Raul Villareal, submitting to beatings from the others. After this, the gang members remained in the park, drinking alcohol.

Two girls who had attended a birthday party, 14-year-old Jennifer Ertman and 16-year-old Elizabeth Peña, took a shortcut through the park to get home before an 11:30 pm curfew. They encountered the gang, and Medellín began talking to Peña and then grabbed her. She attempted to flee, but he forced her to the ground. When Peña cried for help, Ertman ran back to aid her. In response, Cantu and O'Brien pushed her to the ground, as well. Ramon and Frank Sandoval chose to leave at that point.

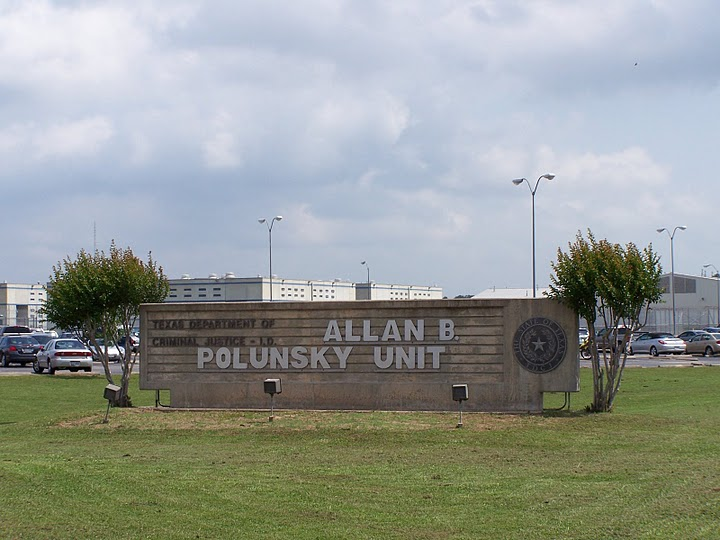
Medellín was moved to the Allan B. Polunsky Unit

The remainder of the gang, as well as Venancio Medellín, took turns anally, orally, and vaginally raping the two girls. Afterwards, they were beaten, then the gang decided to murder the girls so they would not be identified as the rapists. Medellín, along with Cantu and Perez, killed Peña by using her shoelaces to strangle her, then crushing her neck with his foot. Villarreal and O'Brien strangled Ertman with O'Brien's nylon belt, until the belt snapped.

Medellín, Villarreal, Perez, and Cantu then gathered at Cantu's home, where he lived with his brother, Joe Cantu, and sister-in-law, Christina Cantu. Christina Cantu questioned why Villarreal was bleeding and Perez had a bloody shirt. This prompted Medellín to say the gang "had fun", and that details would appear on the news. He then elaborated that he had raped both girls. Peter Cantu then returned, and divided valuables that had been stolen from the girls. Medellín got a ring with an "E", so he could give it to his girlfriend, Esther. Medellín reported that he had killed a girl, and noted that he would have found it easier with a gun. Derrick Sean O'Brien was videotaped smiling at the scene of the crime. After the gang left, Christina Cantu convinced Joe Cantu to report the crime to police. Four days after the crime, the bodies were found in the park. They were badly decaying, and dental records were used for identification. The medical examiner corroborated the cause of death as strangulation. All those believed responsible were ultimately arrested. Medellín gave both written and taped confessions.

== Case history ==
128 S. Ct. 1346; 170 L. Ed. 2d 190; 2008 U.S. LEXIS 2912; 76 U.S.L.W. 4143; 2008-1 U.S. Tax Cas. (CCH) P50,242; 21 Fla. L. Weekly Fed. S 126

In the International Court of Justice, Mexico sued the United States on behalf of Mexican citizens who had been sentenced to death without having their national consulate notified. The court ruled that the United States acted in error and required that the defendants' cases be reopened.

Initially, the US government described Mexico's suit as "an unjustified, unwise, and ultimately unacceptable intrusion in the United States criminal justice system." Reversing that position in early 2005, with Medellín's death-penalty appeal pending before the Supreme Court, the White House announced that it would abide by the decision by instructing the states to reconsider the convictions and sentences of the Mexican nationals on death row. The Supreme Court then dismissed Medellín's case to enable the Texas courts to comply with that directive.

The Texas Court of Criminal Appeals refused to change their rules barring reconsideration of such cases. In that decision, one of the court's judges accused the White House of an "unprecedented, unnecessary, and intrusive exercise of power over the Texas court system". In response, the Bush administration entered the case on Medellín's behalf and urged the Supreme Court to overturn the Texas court's decision. The case, Medellín v. Texas, No. 06-984, was argued on October 10, 2007, and decided on March 25, 2008. The US government's brief, filed by Solicitor General Paul D. Clement, told the justices that the Texas court's decision, if not reversed, "will place the United States in breach of its international law obligation" to comply with the International Court of Justice's decision and would "frustrate the president's judgment that foreign-policy interests are best served by giving effect to that decision." Chief Justice Roberts, joined by Justices Scalia, Kennedy, Thomas, and Alito, rejected the Bush administration's arguments. Justice Stevens wrote a concurring opinion. Justice Breyer, joined by Justices Souter and Ginsburg, dissented.

On May 5, 2008, Medellín's execution was scheduled for August 5, 2008 at 6:00 p.m.

On July 16, 2008, the International Court of Justice asked for a stay of execution on behalf of Medellin and four other Mexican nationals who also did not receive consular notification.

On July 17, 2008, Robert Black, spokesman for Texas Governor Rick Perry, said the state would continue with the scheduled August 5, 2008, execution despite the International Court of Justice order for a stay. "The world court has no standing in Texas and Texas is not bound by a ruling or edict from a foreign court. It is easy to get caught up in discussions of international law and justice and treaties. It's very important to remember that these individuals are on death row for killing our citizens."

== Execution ==
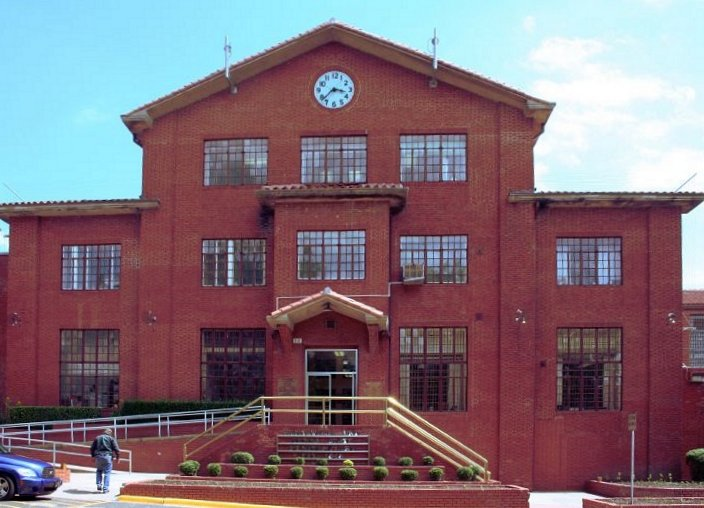
Huntsville Unit, the site of executions in the State of Texas

Medellín was executed at 9:57 p.m. CST on August 5, 2008, after a 4-hour delay while the Supreme Court heard a late appeal, which was denied. He is buried at Captain Joe Byrd Cemetery along with Cantu and O'Brien.

== See also ==
- Capital punishment in Texas
- Capital punishment in the United States
- List of people executed in Texas, 2000–2009
- List of people executed in the United States in 2008
- List of serial killers in the United States

== Cited works and further reading ==
- Mitchell, Corey (2008). Pure Murder. Pinnacle Books. ISBN 978-0-786-01851-2.

Preceded by Larry Donnell Davis	People executed in US after Baze v. Rees ruling	Succeeded by Heliberto Chi
