= Sanchez-Llamas v. Oregon =

- Supreme Court of the United States

Argued March 29, 2006 Decided June 28, 2006
- Full case name: Moises Sanchez-Llamas v. Oregon
- Citations: 548 U.S. 331 (more) 126 S. Ct. 2669; 165 L. Ed. 2d 557; 2006 U.S. LEXIS 5177
- Argument: Oral argument

Holding
- States could admit evidence against defendants even if the evidence was obtained in violation of the Vienna Convention.

Court membership
- Chief Justice John Roberts Associate Justices John P. Stevens · Antonin Scalia; Anthony Kennedy · David Souter; Clarence Thomas · Ruth Bader Ginsburg; Stephen Breyer · Samuel Alito

Case opinions
- Majority: Roberts, joined by Scalia, Kennedy, Thomas, Alito
- Concurrence: Ginsburg (in judgment)
- Dissent: Breyer, joined by Stevens, Souter; Ginsburg (Part II)

Sanchez-Llamas v. Oregon, 548 U.S. 331 (2006), was a case in which the United States Supreme Court held that a state court did not have to exclude evidence that was admitted into court in violation of Article 36 of the Vienna Convention on Consular Relations.

== Background ==
Moises Sanchez-Llamas, a national of Mexico, was convicted of attempted murder in Oregon after engaging police in an armed confrontation. Mario Bustillo, a national of Honduras, was convicted of murder in Virginia for beating a man to death with a baseball bat. Neither man had his consulate informed of the charges against him, as is required by Article 36 of the Vienna Convention on Consular Relations.

Both Sanchez-Llamas and Bustillo filed state habeas petitions in their respective cases arguing that their right to consular notification had been violated. In both Oregon and Virginia, the courts ruled that because the claims were not argued at the trial court level they were procedurally barred. The supreme courts of Oregon and Virginia both upheld the states' procedural bars. The two cases were then consolidated and argued before the United States Supreme Court.

== Opinion of the Court ==
In an opinion by Chief Justice John Roberts, the Court held that states could admit evidence against defendants even if the evidence was obtained in violation of the Vienna Convention. The Court reasoned that the exclusionary rule is idiosyncratic to American jurisprudence and so could not have been in contemplation by other nation-states when they ratified the Vienna Convention.

The Court also held that Article 36 claims not timely brought could be procedurally barred by state procedural default rules.

However, the Supreme Court was unwilling to rule whether or not Article 36 created individual rights that had to be honored in state criminal proceedings.

== See also ==
- Breard v. Greene (1998)
- Medellin v. Texas (2008)
