= Self-executing right =

Human rights with direct application before national courts

Self-executing rights in international human rights law are formulated in such a way that one can deduce that it was the purpose to create international laws that citizens can invoke directly in their national courts. Self-executing rights, or directly applicable rights, are rights that from the viewpoint of international law do not require transformation into national law. The rights are binding as such and judges can apply the international law as if it were national law. From the viewpoint of national law, it may be required that all international law be incorporated into national law before becoming valid. This depends on the national legal tradition.

To decide whether or not a rule is self-executing, one must only look at the rule in question, and national traditions do not count. A rule that says that states should guarantee freedom of expression to its citizens is self-executing. A rule that states should take all the necessary measures to create enough employment is not. Non-self-executing rules of international law impose the obligation on states only to take measures and to create or alter legislation. Citizens or national judges cannot invoke those rules (and demand employment, as in the previous example) in a national court. That means that international law that is not self-executing must be transformed into national law to take effect.

The priority of international law remains a fact whether or not the law is self-executing. A state cannot invoke its national law as a reason not to respect its international obligations. In case of non-self-executing rules, it is obliged to change its national law or to take certain measures. It violates international law if it does not do so. In this case, a national judge can only decide that their state should modify national law or take certain measures. They cannot invalidate national law that contradicts non-self-executing international law. They cannot declare national law null and void unless it contradicts self-executing international rights.

Most human rights contained in the main human rights treaties are self-executing and can be invoked by individuals in a national courtroom, but that is more often the case for civil rights than for economic and social rights.

== See also ==
- Medellín v. Texas
