= Thornton v. Schreiber =

- Supreme Court of the United States

Argued January 19–20, 1888 Decided February 13, 1888
- Full case name: Thornton v. Schreiber
- Citations: 124 U.S. 612 (more) 8 S. Ct. 618; 31 L. Ed. 577

Holding
- A copyright holder may not personally sue an employee of a business for copyright infringement if the employee was holding the infringing material on the order of their employer.

Court membership
- Chief Justice Morrison Waite Associate Justices Samuel F. Miller · Stephen J. Field; Joseph P. Bradley · John M. Harlan; Stanley Matthews · Horace Gray; Samuel Blatchford · Lucius Q. C. Lamar II

Case opinion
- Majority: Miller, joined by unanimous

Thornton v. Schreiber, 124 U.S. 612 (1888), was a United States Supreme Court case in which the Court held a copyright holder may not personally sue an employee of a business for copyright infringement if the employee was holding the infringing material on the order of their employer.
