= United States v. Mouat =

- Supreme Court of the United States

Decided January 23, 1888
- Full case name: United States v. Mouat
- Citations: 124 U.S. 303 (more)

Holding
- Only those persons appointed by the President, the courts of law, or the head of a department are Officers of the United States. All other persons are mere employees.

Court membership
- Chief Justice Morrison Waite Associate Justices Samuel F. Miller · Stephen J. Field; Joseph P. Bradley · John M. Harlan; Stanley Matthews · Horace Gray; Samuel Blatchford · Lucius Q. C. Lamar II

Case opinion
- Majority: Miller, joined by unanimous

Laws applied
- U.S. Const. art. II, § 2, cl. 2

United States v. Mouat, 124 U.S. 303 (1888), was a case before the United States Supreme Court in which the court held that only those persons appointed by the President, the courts of law, or the head of a department are Officers of the United States. All other persons are mere employees.
