= United Nations Security Council Resolution 461 =

UN Security Council Resolution 461
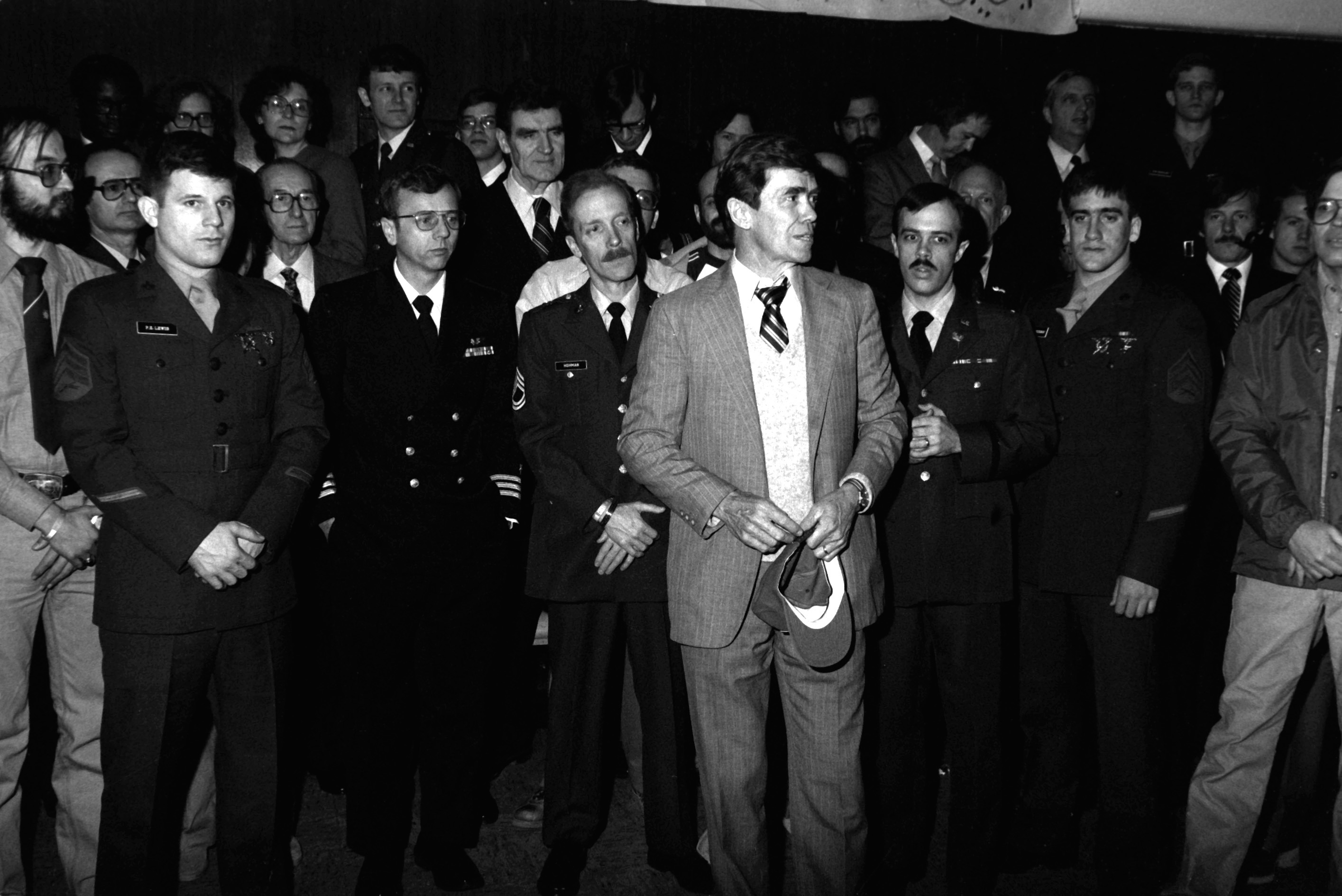
- Former American hostages at hospital
- Date: 31 December 1979
- Meeting no.: 2,184
- Code: S/RES/461 (Document)
- Subject: Islamic Republic of Iran-USA
- Voting summary: 11 voted for; None voted against; 4 abstained
- Result: Adopted

Security Council composition
- Permanent members: China; France; Soviet Union; United Kingdom; United States
- Non-permanent members: Bangladesh; Bolivia; Czechoslovakia; Gabon; Jamaica; Kuwait; Nigeria; Norway; Portugal; Zambia

United Nations Security Council resolution 461, adopted on 31 December 1979, after recalling its Resolution 457 (1979), the council noted the increasing tension between Iran and the United States and condemned Iran for continuing to hold American hostages at the U.S. embassy in Tehran. The council also cited the International Court of Justice order to immediately release the hostages without any exceptions.

The council reminded the member states against threats and the use of force in the international relations, the resolution called once again for the release of the American hostages and to allow them to leave the country. Resolution 461 reiterated the request to the Secretary-General Kurt Waldheim to lend his good offices to seeking a solution to the events and to report his efforts before the council meets again. Finally, the council decided to meet again on 7 January 1980, to review the situation, and if needed, take any further action.

The resolution was adopted by 11 votes to none, while Bangladesh, Czechoslovakia, Kuwait and the Soviet Union abstained from voting.

== See also ==
- Iranian Revolution
- Iran–United States relations
- List of United Nations Security Council Resolutions 401 to 500 (1976–1982)
