= Whitney v. Robertson =

- Supreme Court of the United States

Decided January 9, 1888
- Full case name: Whitney v. Robertson
- Citations: 124 U.S. 190 (more)

Holding
- A treaty and a federal statute are equivalent; if two are in conflict, the one last in time will control, provided the stipulation of the treaty on the subject is self-executing.

Court membership
- Chief Justice Morrison Waite Associate Justices Samuel F. Miller · Stephen J. Field; Joseph P. Bradley · John M. Harlan; Stanley Matthews · Horace Gray; Samuel Blatchford

Case opinion
- Majority: Field, joined by unanimous

Whitney v. Robertson, 124 U.S. 190 (1888), was a United States Supreme Court case in which the court held that a treaty and a federal statute are equivalent; if two are in conflict, the one last in time will control, provided the stipulation of the treaty on the subject is self-executing.

== Background ==
The treaty of February 8, 1867 between the United States and the Dominican Republic provided that "no higher or other duty shall be imposed on the importation into the United States of any article the growth, produce, or manufacture of the Dominican Republic, or of her fisheries, than are or shall be payable on the like articles the growth, produce, or manufacture of any other foreign country or of its fisheries." The convention of January 30, 1875, with the king of the Hawaiian Islands provided for the importation into the United States, free of duty, of various articles, the produce and manufacture of those islands, including sugars.

Merchants claimed in court that the agreement with Dominican Republic required goods from that country to be duty-free as soon as the United States entered into a duty-free agreement with the Hawaiian Kingdom.

== Opinion of the court ==
The Supreme Court issued an opinion on January 9, 1888. The court held that the subsequent duty-free agreement with the Hawaiian Kingdom did not render imports from the Dominican Republic duty-free. The court noted that the case was similar to Bartram v. Robertson, 122 U. S. 116.
