= List of United States Supreme Court cases, volume 124 =

Supreme Court of the United States
- Interactive map of Supreme Court of the United States
- 38°53′26″N 77°00′16″W
- Established: March 4, 1789; 236 years ago
- Location: Washington, D.C.
- Coordinates: 38°53′26″N 77°00′16″W
- Composition method: Presidential nomination with Senate confirmation
- Authorised by: Constitution of the United States, Art. III, § 1
- Judge term length: life tenure, subject to impeachment and removal
- Number of positions: 9 (by statute)
- Website: supremecourt.gov

This is a list of cases reported in volume 124 of United States Reports, decided by the Supreme Court of the United States in 1888.

== Justices of the Supreme Court at the time of volume 124 U.S. ==
The Supreme Court is established by Article III, Section 1 of the Constitution of the United States, which says: "The judicial Power of the United States, shall be vested in one supreme Court . . .". The size of the Court is not specified; the Constitution leaves it to Congress to set the number of justices. Under the Judiciary Act of 1789 Congress originally fixed the number of justices at six (one chief justice and five associate justices). Since 1789 Congress has varied the size of the Court from six to seven, nine, ten, and back to nine justices (always including one chief justice).

When the cases in volume 124 U.S. were decided the Court comprised the following nine members:

Portrait	Justice	Office	Home State	Succeeded	Date confirmed by the Senate (Vote)	Tenure on Supreme Court
	Morrison Waite	Chief Justice	Ohio	Salmon P. Chase	January 21, 1874 (63–0)	March 4, 1874 – March 23, 1888 (Died)
	Samuel Freeman Miller	Associate Justice	Iowa	Peter Vivian Daniel	July 16, 1862 (Acclamation)	July 21, 1862 – October 13, 1890 (Died)
	Stephen Johnson Field	Associate Justice	California	newly created seat	March 10, 1863 (Acclamation)	May 10, 1863 – December 1, 1897 (Retired)
	Joseph P. Bradley	Associate Justice	New Jersey	newly created seat	March 21, 1870 (46–9)	March 23, 1870 – January 22, 1892 (Died)
	John Marshall Harlan	Associate Justice	Kentucky	David Davis	November 29, 1877 (Acclamation)	December 10, 1877 – October 14, 1911 (Died)
	Stanley Matthews	Associate Justice	Ohio	Noah Haynes Swayne	May 12, 1881 (24–23)	May 17, 1881 – March 22, 1889 (Died)
	Horace Gray	Associate Justice	Massachusetts	Nathan Clifford	December 20, 1881 (51–5)	January 9, 1882 – September 15, 1902 (Died)
	Samuel Blatchford	Associate Justice	New York	Ward Hunt	March 22, 1882 (Acclamation)	April 3, 1882 – July 7, 1893 (Died)
	Lucius Quintus Cincinnatus Lamar	Associate Justice	Mississippi	William Burnham Woods	January 16, 1888 (32–28)	January 18, 1888 – January 23, 1893 (Died)

== Citation style ==
Under the Judiciary Act of 1789 the federal court structure at the time comprised District Courts, which had general trial jurisdiction; Circuit Courts, which had mixed trial and appellate (from the US District Courts) jurisdiction; and the United States Supreme Court, which had appellate jurisdiction over the federal District and Circuit courts—and for certain issues over state courts. The Supreme Court also had limited original jurisdiction (i.e., in which cases could be filed directly with the Supreme Court without first having been heard by a lower federal or state court). There were one or more federal District Courts and/or Circuit Courts in each state, territory, or other geographical region.

Bluebook citation style is used for case names, citations, and jurisdictions.

- "C.C.D." = United States Circuit Court for the District of . . .
  - e.g.,"C.C.D.N.J." = United States Circuit Court for the District of New Jersey
- "D." = United States District Court for the District of . . .
  - e.g.,"D. Mass." = United States District Court for the District of Massachusetts
- "E." = Eastern; "M." = Middle; "N." = Northern; "S." = Southern; "W." = Western
  - e.g.,"C.C.S.D.N.Y." = United States Circuit Court for the Southern District of New York
  - e.g.,"M.D. Ala." = United States District Court for the Middle District of Alabama
- "Ct. Cl." = United States Court of Claims
- The abbreviation of a state's name alone indicates the highest appellate court in that state's judiciary at the time.
  - e.g.,"Pa." = Supreme Court of Pennsylvania
  - e.g.,"Me." = Supreme Judicial Court of Maine

== List of cases in volume 124 U.S. ==
Case Name	Page and year	Opinion of the Court	Concurring opinion(s)	Dissenting opinion(s)	Lower Court	Disposition
Lawther v. Hamilton	1 (1888)	Bradley	none	none	C.C.E.D. Wis.	reversed
Humiston v. Wood	12 (1888)	Matthews	none	none	C.C.E.D. Pa.	reversed
Norton v. Hood	20 (1888)	Blatchford	none	none	C.C.E.D. La.	affirmed
Dryfoos v. Wiese	32 (1888)	Blatchford	none	none	C.C.S.D.N.Y.	affirmed
Hinchman v. Lincoln	38 (1888)	Matthews	none	none	C.C.S.D.N.Y.	reversed
Beeson v. Johns	56 (1888)	Miller	none	none	Iowa	affirmed
B. Dreyfus and Company v. Searle	60 (1888)	Blatchford	none	none	C.C.D. Cal.	reversed
H.C. Roberts and Company v. Benjamin	64 (1888)	Blatchford	none	none	C.C.N.D.N.Y.	affirmed
Langdon v. Sherwood	74 (1888)	Miller	none	none	C.C.D. Neb.	multiple
United States ex rel. McLean v. Vilas	86 (1888)	Miller	none	none	Sup. Ct. D.C.	affirmed
Boyd v. Wyly	98 (1888)	Matthews	none	none	C.C.W.D. La.	affirmed
Lawson v. Floyd	108 (1888)	Miller	none	none	D.W. Va.	reversed
Inland and Seaboard Coasting Company v. Hall	121 (1888)	Waite	none	none	Sup. Ct. D.C.	reversed
Glenn v. Fant	123 (1888)	Waite	none	none	Sup. Ct. D.C.	submission denied
New Orleans Pacific Railway Company v. United States	124 (1888)	Blatchford	none	none	Ct. Cl.	affirmed
Gumbel v. Pitkin	131 (1888)	Matthews	none	none	C.C.E.D. La.	reversed
Dundee Mortgage and Trust Investment Company v. Hughes	157 (1888)	Waite	none	none	C.C.D. Or.	affirmed
Woodman v. Missionary Society of the Methodist Episcopal Church	161 (1888)	Waite	none	none	Mich.	order amended
Baltimore and Ohio Railroad Company v. Burns	165 (1888)	Waite	none	none	C.C.D. Md.	affirmed
Baker v. Power	167 (1888)	Waite	none	none	C.C.D. Minn.	dismissal denied
Vetterlein v. Barnes	169 (1888)	Harlan	none	none	C.C.S.D.N.Y.	affirmed
Union Railroad Company v. Dull	173 (1888)	Harlan	none	none	C.C.D. Md.	affirmed
Richards v. Mackall	183 (1888)	Harlan	none	none	Sup. Ct. D.C.	reversed
Whitney v. Robertson	190 (1888)	Field	none	none	C.C.S.D.N.Y.	affirmed
Kelly v. Hedden	196 (1888)	Field	none	none	C.C.S.D.N.Y.	affirmed
Searl v. School District No. 2	197 (1888)	Matthews	none	none	C.C.D. Colo.	reversed
In re Sawyer	200 (1888)	Gray	Field	Waite; Harlan	C.C.D. Neb.	habeas corpus granted
Bissell v. Spring Valley Township	225 (1888)	Field	none	none	C.C.D. Kan.	affirmed
United States v. Johnston	236 (1888)	Harlan	none	none	C.C.S.D.N.Y.	affirmed
United States v. Gleeson	255 (1888)	Gray	none	none	Ct. Cl.	reversed
Sabariego v. Maverick	261 (1888)	Matthews	none	none	C.C.W.D. Tex.	affirmed
United States v. Bond	301 (1888)	Miller	none	none	Ct. Cl.	affirmed
United States v. Mouat	303 (1888)	Miller	none	none	Ct. Cl.	reversed
United States v. Hendee	309 (1888)	Miller	none	none	Ct. Cl.	affirmed
United States v. Frerichs	315 (1888)	Blatchford	none	none	Ct. Cl.	affirmed
District of Columbia v. McBlair	320 (1888)	Matthews	none	none	Sup. Ct. D.C.	reversed
State National Bank v. Dodge	333 (1888)	Blatchford	none	none	C.C.S.D. Ill.	reversed
Matthews v. Iron-Clad Manufacturing Company	347 (1888)	Gray	none	none	C.C.S.D.N.Y.	affirmed
Shields v. Schiff	351 (1888)	Bradley	none	none	La.	affirmed
Chapin v. Streeter	360 (1888)	Miller	none	none	C.C.D. Colo.	affirmed
In re Sherman	364 (1888)	Waite	none	none	C.C.S.D.N.Y.	mandamus denied
Union Mutual Life Insurance Company v. Waters	369 (1888)	Waite	none	none	C.C.N.D. Ohio	reversed
In re Craft	370 (1888)	Waite	none	none	Sup. Ct. D.C.	dismissed
Iron Silver Mining Company v. Reynolds	374 (1888)	Field	none	none	C.C.D. Colo.	reversed
Florence Mining Company v. Brown, Bonnell and Company	385 (1888)	Field	none	none	C.C.N.D. Ohio	affirmed
Marshall v. United States	391 (1888)	Harlan	none	none	Ct. Cl.	affirmed
Brooks v. Missouri	394 (1888)	Waite	none	none	Mo.	dismissed
Widdicombe v. Childers	400 (1888)	Waite	none	none	Mo.	affirmed
Union Insurance Company v. Smith	405 (1888)	Blatchford	none	none	C.C.N.D. Ohio	affirmed
Cushing, Porter and Cades v. Beard	429 (1888)	Blatchford	none	none	C.C.D. Mass.	affirmed
Worthington v. Jere Abbott and Company	434 (1888)	Blatchford	none	none	C.C.D. Mass.	affirmed
Beard v. Cushing, Porter and Cades	437 (1888)	Blatchford	none	none	C.C.D. Mass.	affirmed
Western Union Telegraph Company v. Hall	444 (1888)	Matthews	none	none	C.C.S.D. Iowa	reversed
King Iron Bridge and Manufacturing Company v. Otoe County	459 (1888)	Waite	none	none	C.C.D. Neb.	reversed
Smith v. Alabama	465 (1888)	Matthews	none	none	Ala.	affirmed
United States v. Hess	483 (1888)	Field	none	none	C.C.S.D.N.Y.	certification
Brown v. McConnell	489 (1888)	Waite	none	none	Sup. Ct. Terr. Wash.	dismissed
Stewart v. Masterson	493 (1888)	Waite	none	none	C.C.W.D. Tex.	dismissed
Brazee v. Schofield	495 (1888)	Field	none	none	Sup. Ct. Terr. Wash.	affirmed
District of Columbia v. Gallaher	505 (1888)	Matthews	none	none	Ct. Cl.	affirmed
Hopkins v. Orr	510 (1888)	Gray	none	none	Sup. Ct. Terr. N.M.	affirmed
Trask v. Jacksonville, Pensacola and Mobile Railroad Company	515 (1888)	Waite	none	none	C.C.N.D. Fla.	affirmed
Fayolle v. Texas and Pacific Railway Co.	519 (1888)	Waite	none	none	Sup. Ct. D.C.	dismissed
French v. Hopkins	524 (1888)	Waite	none	none	Cal.	dismissed
United States v. Smith	525 (1888)	Field	none	none	C.C.S.D.N.Y.	certification
Aetna Life Insurance Company v. Middleport Township	534 (1888)	Miller	none	none	C.C.N.D. Ill.	affirmed
Knight v. Paxton	552 (1888)	Field	none	none	C.C.N.D. Ill.	affirmed
The Strathairly	558 (1888)	Matthews	none	none	C.C.D. Cal.	reversed
Great Falls Manufacturing Company v. Attorney General	581 (1888)	Harlan	none	none	C.C.D. Md.	affirmed
Munson v. City of New York	601 (1888)	Gray	none	none	C.C.S.D.N.Y.	reversed
Phillips v. Mound City Land and Water Association	605 (1888)	Waite	none	none	Cal.	dismissed
Thornton v. Schreiber	612 (1888)	Miller	none	none	C.C.E.D. Pa.	reversed
United States v. Jung Ah Lung	621 (1888)	Blatchford	none	Harlan	C.C.D. Cal.	affirmed
Hoadley's Administrators v. City of San Francisco	639 (1888)	Waite	none	none	Cal.	affirmed
United States v. Morant	647 (1888)	Bradley	none	none	N.D. Fla.	judgment amended
Crawford v. Halsey	648 (1888)	Waite	none	none	C.C.E.D. La.	affirmed
Dow v. Memphis and Little Rock Railroad Co.	652 (1888)	Waite	none	none	C.C.E.D. Ark.	reversed
City of Hoboken v. Pennsylvania Railroad Company	656 (1888)	Matthews	none	none	C.C.D.N.J.	affirmed
Andrews v. Hovey	694 (1888)	Blatchford	none	none	C.C.S.D. Iowa	rehearing denied
Andrews v. Cone	720 (1888)	Blatchford	none	none	C.C.D. Minn.	affirmed
Pacific National Bank v. Mixter	721 (1888)	Waite	none	none	C.C.D. Mass.	multiple
Shoecraft v. Internal Improvement Fund of Florida	730 (1888)	Field	none	none	C.C.N.D. Fla.	affirmed
