= ICJ (Review and Re-consideration) Bill 2020 =

Act of Parliament

International Court of Justice (Review & Reconsideration) Bill, 2020

Parliament of Pakistan
- Considered by: Parliament of Pakistan
- Enacted by: National Assembly of Pakistan lower House
- Enacted: June 11, 2021
- Enacted by: Senate of Pakistan Upper House
- Enacted: Pending
- Assented to: Pending
- Signed by: not yet

The International Court of Justice (Review & Reconsideration) Bill 2020 passed by lower House of Pakistan National Assembly on 11 June 2021, Meanwhile, the House also passed a bill to provide for the right of review and reconsideration to bring into effect the judgment of the International Court of Justice in the Kulbhushan Jadhav case. The bill was moved by Minister for Law and Justice Dr Muhammad Farogh Nasim in the House. The statement of objects and reasons of the bill says that the government of India initiated proceedings against Pakistan in the International Court of Justice (ICJ), concerning alleged violations of the Vienna Convention on Consular Relations of 24 April 1963 "in the matter of detention and trial of an Indian national, Commander Kulbhushan Sudhir Jadhav", who had been sentenced to death by the Military Court in Pakistan in April 2017. The ICJ gave its judgment on 17 July 2019 wherein it observed that "Pakistan is under an obligation to provide by means of its own choosing effective review and reconsideration of the conviction and sentence of Mr Jadhav, so as to ensure that full weight is given to the effect of the violation of the rights set forth in Article 36 of the Vienna Convention, taking account of paragraphs 139, 145 and 146 of this judgment." In order to give full effect to the said judgment, it is necessary that a mechanism for review and reconsideration of Pakistan's own choice be provided. This can be done by law only. Pakistan last year in May passed ordinance which was passed in October same year.
