= Consideration set =

Aspect of consumer theory

Consideration set is a model used in consumer behaviour to represent all of the brands and products a consumer evaluates before making a final purchase decision. The term consideration set was first used in 1977 by Peter Wright and Fredrick Barbour. The consideration set is a subset of the awareness set, which is all of the brands and products a consumer initially thinks of when faced with a purchasing decision. The awareness set is filtered into the consideration set through the consumer's individual thoughts, preferences, and feelings – such as price, mood, previous experiences, and heuristics. Conversely, products that do not meet the criteria for the consideration set are either placed into the inert set or the inept set. These sets are fluid and the products in each set can change rapidly when the consumer is presented with new information.

== Set hierarchy and theory ==
Consider the universal set, $U$, to be the set of all products and brands which will satisfy a given need. The awareness or knowledge set, $A$, is defined as all of the products and brands within the universal set that the consumer is aware of. This awareness can be derived from a product search, brand familiarity, advertisements, word-of-mouth, or any other method which informs the consumer of a viable option. While the awareness set is largely composed of products that reside in the consumer's long-term memory, the awareness set can also be expanded by products found during the search process – such as recommended products on an e-commerce site or shelves in a supermarket. Thus $A \subseteq U$.

The awareness set can be further divided into the following sets:

- The consideration set: all of the brands or products seriously considered and evaluated by the consumer, denoted $C$. It is not required (or typical) that the consumer has an equal level of knowledge about all of the alternatives in this set.
- The inert set: all of the brands or products that the consumer has no opinion about, denoted $R$. The consumer likely has little to no exposure to this product and therefore has neither negative nor positive associations.
- The inept set: all of the brands or products the consumer eliminates from further consideration, denoted $P$. The consumer likely has poor experiences with the brand or product, or has heard of others' bad experiences.

Thus, $C \cup R \cup P = A \subseteq U$

== Psychological basis ==
The consideration set models how humans behave when faced with many choices. While the consideration set is not directly observable, researchers believe that its existence is evident by a logical conjunction of prominent economic and psychological theories.

In this model, consumers screen many product options before fully evaluating just a few options (usually 2–5), which reduces the cognitive load and fatigue of an exhaustive search. This screening process is mostly based on heuristics about the product, and is generally considered to be a lower-effort process than the evaluation of the consideration set, once it is formed. Studies on heuristic screening methodologies have shown that consumers are more satisfied with their purchase decision and less stressed by the decision-making process when the consideration set is smaller. This is particularly true when information overload is high; that is, the quantity of available information exceeds the processing power a consumer is willing to dedicate to it.

Researchers have several theories as to why the consideration set is formed. The formation of the consideration set is considered the first step in common decision-making frameworks, with the second step being choosing an alternative from the set.

=== Formation ===
Consumer behavior researchers have identified many frameworks, methodologies, and heuristics consumers often use to form a consideration set. This is not an exhaustive list, and that the formation of the consideration set varies significantly depending on the consumer and context of the decision. Nonetheless, some commonly observed methodologies are:

- Top n: Consumers may only choose to evaluate the top n alternatives based on a single common attribute. For example, consumers may only look at the first page of search results on Google, the 5 highest rated products on Amazon, or the highest safety rated cars.
- Shortlisting: Consumers may create a shortlist of undominated options according to an asymmetric, incomplete, or cyclic binary relation. Alternatives outside of this shortlist are moved to the inept or inert set.
- Top on Each: Consumers may consider several rankings or attributes, only considering the top n elements of each ranking class. For example, consumers may only fully evaluate the cheapest product, the highest rated product, and the most popular product.
- Categorization: Consumers may enact a two-phase elimination procedure in which alternatives are first categorized into sets based on similarity. These sets are entirely distinct from the consideration, inert, and inept set and rather represent broader categories which focus on the product similarity rather than their relation to the consumer. The consumer then selects one of these sets to consider. An example would be to first group cars into subsets of sedan, SUV, and truck – and then make a selection of the optimal subset.
- Rationalization: Consumers may provide a logical explanation for a product or brand choice, when the explained logical reason is different from the true reason. In this model, a consumer may only choose products that they can rationalize to choose because of a subjective appeal to themselves, their family, and/or society.
- Narrowing Down: Consumers may reduce the awareness set to the consideration set by continuously adding more criteria to evaluate alternatives. For example, a consumer may narrow down a smartphone choice by first selecting Apple as the brand of choice, then only considering Apple smartphones released in the last year, and then only considering Apple smartphones released in the last year with 128gb of memory.

=== Decision-making ===
Once the consideration set is formed, the next step is to select an alternative from the evaluated options. There are several models that describe how consumers make these selections, however many researchers believe that this process is concurrent with the formation process; that is, product selection is often being contemplated while the consideration set is forming. Nonetheless, the following methodologies are widely considered to be the second step of consumer decision making:

- Unweighted Linear Compensatory: Consumers may select important brand attributes to measure or quantify for each product, which are then summed and averaged. The product from the consideration set with the highest score is then selected.
- Weighted Linear Compensatory: Consumers may evaluate brand attribute importance and assign each attribute a "weight", which represents the attribute's importance. These weighted attributes are then measured on all of the products in the consideration set, and a weighted sum and average are computed. Finally, the product with the highest score is selected.
- Conjunctive Rule: Consumers may determine a cut-off point for each salient attribute of the products in the consideration set. Then, the product which meets the cut-off point for each salient attribute is selected.
- Disjunctive Rule: Similar to the conjunctive rule, consumers may determine a cut-off point for each salient attribute of the products in the consideration set. Then, conversely, the first brand which meets the cut-off point for only one attribute is selected.
- Lexiographic Rule: Consumers may select a cut-off point for the most salient attribute of the products in the consideration set. The products which meet this cut-off point are selected, and then the next most salient attribute is evaluated until only one product is remaining. This methodology is similar to the narrowing down formation heuristic.
- Subset Conjunctive Rule: Consumers may determine a cut-off point for each salient attribute of the products in the consideration set. Then, a product is selected if at least $S$ features are at an acceptable level. The subset conjunctive rule is actually a broader category that encapsulates both the conjunctive and disjunctive rules. The conjunctive rule is a special case in which $S$ is equivalent to the total number of attributes. The disjunctive rule is a special case in which $S = 1$.

== Limitations and critiques ==
The decision-making process is still not well enough understood to clarify the distinction between the models used to represent the process and the process of decision-making itself. Many researchers reject the idea of a two-step decision-making process using a consideration set, and instead insist on viewing the consideration set as simply an indicator of preferences. Many researchers claim that knowing a particular consumer's consideration set is not enough to predict their final product choice, and this knowledge is trivial when compared to something like the utility function, which is much more robust. Since neither the utility function or consideration set are directly observable, researchers are still unsure whether either is an accurate or useful model for describing choice. Because consideration is not directly observable, researchers have developed methods to infer patterns of product co-consideration from consumer activity data. A 2018 study used a large dataset of online vehicle price-quote requests to probabilistically infer predominant co-consideration patterns in the U.S. automobile market from spatiotemporal patterns in the data, despite the absence of individual consumer identifiers. Incorporating the inferred market structure into a sales-response model substantially improved predictive performance.

Another criticism of the consideration set is how it is applied. Marketers often assume that all consumers have the same consideration set; that is, they assume all consumers are selecting between the same set of options. The consideration set is actually theorized to be highly individualistic – and the products within it reflect a variety of factors such as the consumer's socioeconomic status, attitudes, and perceptions. This implies that marketers should treat consideration set formation as probabilistic, rather than objective.
