= Medellín v. Texas =

- Supreme Court of the United States

Argued October 10, 2007 Decided March 25, 2008
- Full case name: Jose Ernesto Medellin, Petitioner v. Texas
- Docket no.: 06-984
- Citations: 552 U.S. 491 (more) 128 S. Ct. 1346; 170 L. Ed. 2d 190; 2008 U.S. LEXIS 2912; 76 U.S.L.W. 4143; 2008-1 U.S. Tax Cas. (CCH) ¶ 50,242; 21 Fla. L. Weekly Fed. S 126
- Argument: Oral argument

Case history
- Prior: Medellín v. State, No. 71,997 (Tex. Crim. App., May 16, 1997); petition denied, S.D. Tex.; certificate of appealability denied, 371 F.3d 270 (5th Cir. 2004); cert. granted, 543 U.S. 1032 (2005); cert. dismissed, 544 U.S. 660 (2005) (per curiam) (Medellín I); Ex parte Medellín, 223 S.W. 3d 315 (Tex. Crim. App. 2006); cert. granted Ex parte Medellín, 550 U.S. 917 (2007).
- Subsequent: Stay and petition denied, 554 U.S. 759 (2008) (Medellín III)

Questions presented
- 1. Did the President of the United States act within his constitutional and statutory foreign affairs authority when he determined that the states must comply with the United States’ treaty obligation to give effect to the Avena judgment in the cases of the 51 Mexican nationals named in the judgment?; 2. Are state courts bound by the Constitution to honor the undisputed international obligation of the United States, under treaties duly ratified by the President with the advice and consent of the Senate, to give effect to the Avena judgment in the cases that the judgment addressed?

Holding
- Neither Case Concerning Avena and Other Mexican Nationals (Mex. v. U.S.), 2004 I.C.J. 12, nor the President's Memorandum to the Attorney General (Feb. 28, 2005) constitutes an enforceable federal law that pre-empts state limitations on the filing of habeas corpus petitions.

Court membership
- Chief Justice John Roberts Associate Justices John P. Stevens · Antonin Scalia; Anthony Kennedy · David Souter; Clarence Thomas · Ruth Bader Ginsburg; Stephen Breyer · Samuel Alito

Case opinions
- Majority: Roberts, joined by Scalia, Kennedy, Thomas, Alito
- Concurrence: Stevens (in judgment)
- Dissent: Breyer, joined by Souter, Ginsburg

Laws applied
- Optional Protocol Concerning the Compulsory Settlement of Disputes to the Vienna Convention, April 24, 1963, (1970) 21 U.S.T. 325, T.I.A.S. No. 6820; Article 36(1)(b) of the Vienna Convention on Consular Relations; Article 94 of the United Nations Charter; U.S. Const., Art. II, §3

Medellín v. Texas, 552 U.S. 491 (2008), was a decision of the United States Supreme Court that held even when a treaty constitutes an international commitment, it is not binding domestic law unless it has been implemented by an act of the U.S. Congress or contains language expressing that it is "self-executing" upon ratification. The Court also ruled that decisions of the International Court of Justice are not binding upon the U.S. and, like treaties, cannot be enforced by the president without authority from Congress or the U.S. Constitution.

== Background ==
The United States ratified the United Nations Charter on October 24, 1945. Article 92 of the Charter established the International Court of Justice. The ICJ Statute, which sets forth the procedures and jurisdiction of the ICJ, and was attached to the UN Charter, delineates two ways in which a nation may consent to ICJ jurisdiction. It may consent generally to jurisdiction on any question arising under a treaty or general international law, or it may consent specifically to jurisdiction over a particular category of cases or disputes pursuant to a separate treaty.

In 1969, the United States ratified the Vienna Convention on Consular Relations of April 24, 1963, and the Optional Protocol Concerning the Compulsory Settlement of Disputes to the Vienna Convention of April 24, 1963. Article 36 of the Vienna Convention requires for foreign nationals who are arrested or detained be given notice "without delay" of their right to have their embassy or consulate notified of that arrest. The Optional Protocol provides that disputes arising out of the interpretation or application of the Vienna Convention "shall lie within the compulsory jurisdiction of the International Court of Justice."

The United States withdrew from general ICJ jurisdiction on October 7, 1985.

On June 24, 1993, José Ernesto Medellín, an 18-year-old Mexican citizen, and several other gang members participated in the murders of Jennifer Ertman and Elizabeth Peña, which involved their rape of a 14-year-old and 16-year-old girl for an hour in Houston, Texas. Both girls were killed to prevent them from identifying their assailants. Medellín strangled one of the girls with her own shoelaces.

Medellín was arrested five days later and signed a confession after he had been given his Miranda warning. Hours after Medellin's arrest, he admitted to his part in the crime and boasted of having "virgin blood" on his underpants.

Texas authorities did not, however, advise him of his right to contact his consulate under the terms of the Vienna Convention. Medellín was convicted of rape and murder and sentenced to death in 1997. He raised the issue of his Vienna Convention rights during his appeal, but his conviction was upheld by the trial court and by the Texas Court of Criminal Appeals.

In 2003, Medellín filed a petition for habeas corpus in United States district court. The district court denied relief, holding that Medellín's Vienna Convention claim should have been raised at trial, not on appeal, and that he had failed to show prejudice against his case arising from the Vienna Convention violation.

Also in 2003, Mexico brought suit against the United States in the ICJ and claimed that the United States had failed to notify 51 defendants (all Mexican citizens having been accused in state courts of committing crimes in the US) of their Vienna Convention right to notify their consulate. Medellín was one of these. The following year, the ICJ ruled in Case Concerning Avena and Other Mexican Nationals (Mex. v. U. S.), 2004 I.C.J. 12 (Judgment of March 31) (Avena) that the 51 Mexican nationals were entitled to review and reconsideration of their convictions and sentences.

Medellín's appeal now found its way to the Fifth Circuit Court of Appeals. Medellín raised the ICJ's ruling in Avena before the Fifth Circuit, but the federal appellate court denied relief.

On March 7, 2005, after the ICJ judgment in Avena, the United States withdrew from the Optional Protocol.

Medellín appealed to the US Supreme Court, which granted a writ of certiorari.

Before the Supreme Court could hear the case, however, President George W. Bush issued a Memorandum to the United States Attorney General. In the Memorandum, Bush asserted authority under the Constitution and the various laws of the United States to order states to review the convictions and sentences of foreign nationals who had not been advised of their Vienna Convention rights. Because of the Memorandum, Medellín filed a second case in state court for habeas corpus. The US Supreme Court then dismissed Medellín's first petition for certiorari in a per curiam decision, Medellín v. Dretke, 544 U.S. 660 (2005) (Medellín I).

The Texas Court of Criminal Appeals dismissed Medellín's second appeal, and the US Supreme Court granted certiorari a second time.

As Medellín's second appeal was under consideration in Texas, the U.S. Supreme Court decided Sanchez-Llamas v. Oregon. Although the decision did not involve the individuals named in the Avena judgment, the Court held the ICJ's ruling in Avena to have been in error. Absent a clear and express statement to the contrary in either the Vienna Convention or the Optional Protocol, the Court held in Sanchez-Llamas that the procedural rules of each nation govern the implementation of the treaty. Since Sanchez-Llamas' rights had been observed under both state and federal law, the Supreme Court upheld his conviction. The ruling in Sanchez-Llamas did not control Medellín's case, however, since his claim was based on the rights accorded him as one of the individuals in the ICJ's judgment, rather than on the Vienna Convention. Since the ICJ had jurisdiction to render the decision in Avena at the time under the Optional Protocol, no one argued that Sanchez-Llamas alone foreclosed Medellín's claim.

The case was argued before the U.S. Supreme Court on October 9, 2007, with Texas Solicitor General Ted Cruz appearing for the state and U.S Solicitor General Paul Clement appearing as amicus curiae in support of Medellín.

== Opinion of the Court ==
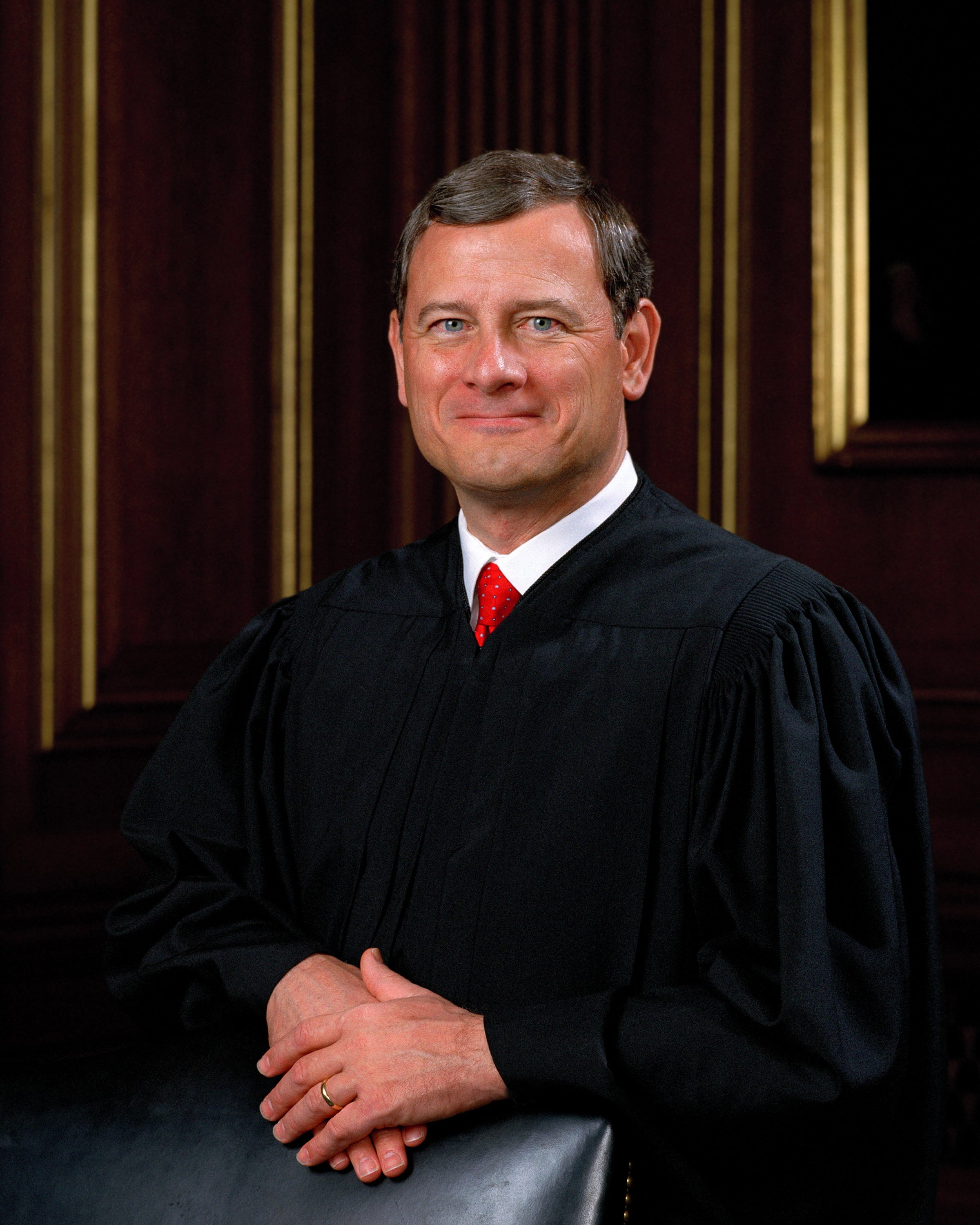
John Roberts delivered the opinion of the Court

On March 24, 2008, the Court affirmed 6–3, with Chief Justice John G. Roberts writing for a five-justice majority. The Court held that the Avena judgment is not enforceable as domestic law unless Congress has enacted statutes implementing it or the treaty itself conveys an intention that it is "self-executing." None of the relevant treaties – the Optional Protocol, the UN Charter, or the ICJ Statute – was self-executing, and no implementing legislation had been enacted, the Court found.

The Court also rejected Medellín's claim that Article 94 of the UN Charter requires the United States to "undertake to comply" with the ICJ ruling. Chief Justice Roberts observed that Article 94(2) of the Charter provides for explicit enforcement for noncompliance by referral to the UN Security Council, and for appeals to be made by only the aggrieved state, not an individual such as Medellín. Even so, the United States clearly reserved the right to veto any Security Council resolutions. The majority also held that the ICJ statute contained in the Charter also forbade individuals from being parties to suits before the International Court. The ICJ statute is a pact between nations, Justice Roberts said, and only nations, not individuals, may seek its judgment.

Relying on Sanchez-Llamas, the Supreme Court then held that absent a clear and express statement to the contrary in the relevant treaties, domestic procedural rules govern a treaty's implementation.

The Court also rejected Medellín's argument that the President's February 28, 2005 Memorandum was binding on state courts. The Court relied on Youngstown Sheet & Tube Co. v. Sawyer, 343 U. S. 579 (1952), recognizing that "plainly compelling interests" were at stake in the Medellín case, but noted:

Such considerations, however, do not allow us to set aside first principles. The President's authority to act, as with the exercise of any governmental power, 'must stem either from an act of Congress or from the Constitution itself.'

The majority concluded that neither condition had been met. Neither the government nor the defendant had cited any statutory authority which authorized the President to act. Instead, the President claimed that the Optional Protocol and UN Charter implicitly gave him the authority to act. The Court disagreed: "The President has an array of political and diplomatic means available to enforce international obligations, but unilaterally converting a non-self-executing treaty into a self-executing one is not among them." The President also claimed that Congress had acquiesced in the exercise of presidential power by failing to act following the resolution of prior ICJ controversies. However, Roberts held, "A review of the Executive's actions in those prior cases, however, cannot support the claim that Congress acquiesced in this particular exercise of Presidential authority, for none of them remotely involved transforming an international obligation into domestic law and thereby displacing state law." The President also founded his action on "related" statutory responsibilities and an "established role" in litigating foreign policy concerns, but none of the examples cited in the government's brief supported that conclusion, the majority ruled, and none of the examples remotely indicated that the President may preempt state law.

The government had also claimed that the Memorandum was an exercise of the President's authority to resolve international claims under his executive authority. The Court recognized that it was a longstanding practice "never-before questioned." But relying on Dames & Moore v. Regan, 453 U.S. 654 (1981), the Court observed, "Past practice does not, by itself, create power." All prior uses of executive authority to settle international disputes all occurred in narrow circumstances and did not involve the complete setting aside of state law, as the defendant sought in the present case.

Finally, Medellín argued that the President's Memorandum was a valid exercise of presidential power based on the president's authority to "take Care that the Laws be faithfully executed," as granted in the Article II, Section 3 of the United States Constitution. The majority observed that the government refused to rely on Article II, Section 3, which undercut Medellín's claim. Justice Roberts then concluded that since the ICJ decision in Avena was not domestic law, the "take care" clause did not apply.

The judgment of the Texas Court of Criminal Appeals was affirmed.

Justice Roberts' opinion was joined by Justices Scalia, Kennedy, Thomas, and Alito.

=== Justice Stevens' concurrence ===
Justice John Paul Stevens largely concurred with the majority's conclusion but thought the case "presents a closer question than the Court's opinion allows", as he agreed with much of the dissenting argument that the "history of the Supremacy Clause, as well as this Court’s treaty-related cases, do not support a presumption against self-execution". Stevens argued that the Supreme Court could not enforce the ICJ opinion in Avena, as nothing in the U.N. Charter "incorporate[s] international judgments into domestic law"; however, he believed the ICJ's judgment still constituted an international commitment that both federal and state governments should "take action necessary" to comply with...".

=== Dissent ===
Justice Breyer's dissent that the majority misapplied the language of the ICJ treaty and failed to take into account long-established caselaw that found treaties to be binding absent additional Congressional action. His conclusion was that "treaty obligations, and hence the judgment [of the ICJ], resting as it does upon the consent of the United States to the ICJ's jurisdiction, bind the courts no less than would "an act of the [federal] legislature".

Breyer cited the 1796 case Ware v. Hylton, which he considered illustrative of what "the Founders meant when they wrote [in the Supremacy Clause of the United States Constitution] that 'all Treaties... shall be the supreme Law of the Land.'" In Ware, the Supreme Court had agreed with a British creditor that a provision of the Treaty of Paris of 1783, which had been ratified by Congress, overruled a conflicting Virginia law. Breyer noted that no further legislative act had implemented the treaty, but rather the Court found that its provisions were automatically incorporated as domestic law per the Supremacy Clause.

Breyer's dissent was joined by Justices Souter and Ginsburg.

== Aftermath ==
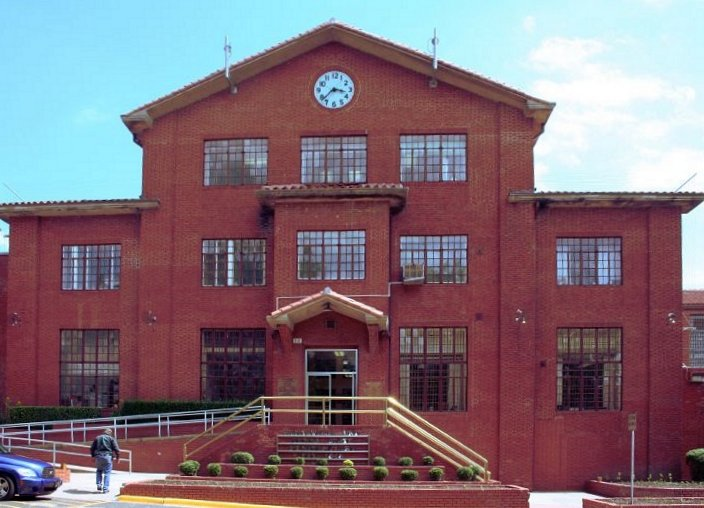
Huntsville Unit, the site of executions in the State of Texas

Medellín was executed at 9:57 pm on August 5, 2008, after his last-minute appeals were rejected by the U.S. Supreme Court. Texas Governor Rick Perry rejected calls from Mexico and Washington, D.C., to delay the execution, citing the torture, rape and strangulation of two teenage girls as just cause for the death penalty.

=== Legal analysis ===
The Medellín decision has been criticized by scholars of international law on several grounds. The ruling has been interpreted as implicitly rejecting the principle that courts should hold a strong presumption in favor of treaty self-execution; some analysts echo the dissent's argument that the Court, in failing to address the Supremacy Clause in its decision, essentially ruled that treaties are presumptively non-self-executing without an adequate legal basis. Similarly, other critics contend that the Court departed from established caselaw by applying an analysis "never engaged in" by prior courts that had interpreted treaties.

Other jurists have cautioned against these contentions, interpreting the decision as merely requiring that self-execution be determined on a "treaty-by-treaty basis" without any general presumption for or against either position.

Kristofer Monson, who served as Assistant Solicitor General of Texas, argues that much of the criticism of Medellin is rooted in principles of public international law rather than in U.S. domestic law, which gives courts the authority to interpret the scope and binding nature of a treaty no differently than a federal statute. He notes that no justice challenged the Court's power and necessity to analyze even a presumably self-executing treaty, but rather disagreed on the proper analytical framework.

In his successful 2012 campaign for the U.S. Senate, as well as during his 2016 presidential candidacy, Republican Ted Cruz cited his work as Solicitor General of Texas in Medellin v. Texas as his proudest achievement, describing it as "by far the biggest case of my tenure".

== See also ==
- List of United States Supreme Court cases
- Lists of United States Supreme Court cases by volume
- List of United States Supreme Court cases by the Roberts Court

== Sources ==
- Geslison, Benjamin A. (2009). "Treaties, Execution, and Originalism in Medellín v. Texas, 128 S. Ct. 1346 (2008)" (PDF). Harvard Journal of Law & Public Policy. 32 (2): 767.
- McGuinness, Margaret E. (2008). "Three Narratives of Medellín v. Texas". Suffolk Transnational Law Review. 31 (2): 227. ISSN 1072-8546.
- Charnovitz, Steve (July 2008). "Revitalizing the U.S. Compliance Power". American Journal of International Law. 102 (3). The American Journal of International Law, Vol. 102, No. 3: 551–562. doi:10.2307/20456643. JSTOR 20456643. S2CID 144237972.
- Turner, James A. (February 2010). "The Post-Medellin Case for Legislative Standing". American University Law Review. 59 (3): 732–779.
