= Vienna Convention on Consular Relations =

1963 international treaty

- Parties to the convention Parties Signatories Non-signatories
- Drafted: 22 April 1963
- Signed: 24 April 1963
- Location: Vienna
- Effective: 19 March 1967
- Condition: Ratification by 22 states
- Signatories: 48
- Parties: 182 (as of November 2021)
- Depositary: UN Secretary-General (Convention and the two Protocols); Federal Ministry for Foreign Affairs of Austria (Final Act)
- Citations: 596 U.N.T.S. 261; 23 U.S.T. 3227
- Languages: Chinese, English, French, Russian and Spanish

Full text
- Vienna Convention on Consular Relations at Wikisource

The Vienna Convention on Consular Relations is an international treaty that defines a framework for consular relations between sovereign states. It codifies many consular practices that originated from state custom and various bilateral agreements between states.

Consuls have traditionally been employed to represent the interests of states or their nationals at an embassy or consulate in another country. The Convention defines and articulates the functions, rights, and immunities accorded to consular officers and their offices, as well as the rights and duties of "receiving States" (where the consul is based) and "sending States" (the state the consul represents).

Adopted in 1963, and in force since 1967, the treaty has been ratified by 182 states.

== History ==
The convention was adopted on 24 April 1963 following the United Nations Conference on Consular Relations in Vienna, Austria from 4 March to 22 April 1963. Its official texts are in English, French, Chinese, Russian and Spanish; the Convention provides that the five versions are equally authentic.

== Key provisions ==
The treaty contains 79 articles. The preamble to the Convention states that customary international law continues to apply to matters not addressed in the convention. Some significant provisions include.

- Article 5 lists thirteen functions of a consul, including "protecting in the receiving State the interests of the sending State and of its nationals … within the limits permitted by international law", "helping and assisting nationals … of the sending State", and "furthering the development of commercial, economic, cultural and scientific relations between the sending State and the receiving State."
- Article 23 provides that the host nation may at any time and for any reason declare a particular member of the consular staff to be persona non grata, and that the sending state must recall this person within a reasonable period of time, or the person may lose their consular immunity.
- Article 31 provides that the consular premises are inviolable (i.e., the host nation may not enter the consular premises, and must protect the premises from intrusion or damage).
- Article 35 provides that freedom of communication between the consul and their home country must be preserved, that consular bags "shall be neither opened nor detained"; and that a consular courier must never be detained.
- Article 36 addresses communications between consular officers and nationals of the sending state. The Convention provides that "consular officers shall be free to communicate with nationals of the sending State and to have access to them." Foreign nationals who are arrested or detained be given notice "without delay" of their right to have their embassy or consulate notified of that arrest, and "consular officers shall have the right to visit a national of the sending State who is in prison, custody or detention, to converse and correspond with him and to arrange for his legal representation."
- Article 37 provides that with the host country must "without delay" notify consular officers of the sending state if one of the sending state's nationals dies or has a guardian or trustee appointed over him. The article also provides that consular officers must be informed "without delay" if a vessel with the sending state's nationality is wrecked or runs aground "in the territorial sea or internal waters of the receiving State, or if an aircraft registered in the sending State suffers an accident on the territory of the receiving State."
- Article 40 provides that "The receiving State shall treat consular officers with due respect and shall take all appropriate steps to prevent any attack on their person, freedom or dignity."
- Articles 58-68 deal with honorary consular officers and their powers and functions.

=== Consular immunity ===
The convention (Article 43) provides for consular immunity. Some but not all provisions in the Convention regarding this immunity reflect customary international law. Consular immunity is a lesser form of diplomatic immunity. Consular officers and consular employees have "functional immunity" (i.e., immunity from the jurisdiction of the receiving state "in respect of acts performed in exercise of consular function"), but do not enjoy the broader "personal immunity" accorded to diplomats.

== State parties to the Convention ==
Parties Signatories Non-signatory UN member states

There are 182 state parties to the convention, including most UN member states and UN observer states Holy See and State of Palestine. The signatory states that have not ratified the convention are: Central African Republic, Israel, Ivory Coast and Republic of Congo. The UN member states that have neither signed nor ratified the convention are: Afghanistan, Burundi, Chad, Comoros, Guinea-Bissau, Ethiopia, Palau, San Marino and South Sudan.

== Application of the treaty by the United States ==
In March 2005, following the decisions of the International Court of Justice in the LaGrand case (2001) and Avena case (2004), the United States withdrew from the Optional Protocol to the Convention concerning the Compulsory Settlement of Disputes, which confers the ICJ with compulsory jurisdiction over disputes arising under the convention.

In 2006, the United States Supreme Court ruled that foreign nationals who were not notified of their right to consular notification and access after an arrest may not use the treaty violation to suppress evidence obtained in police interrogation or belatedly raise legal challenges after trial (Sanchez-Llamas v. Oregon). In 2008, the U.S. Supreme Court further ruled that the decision of the ICJ directing the United States to give "review and reconsideration" to the cases of 51 Mexican convicts on death row was not a binding domestic law and therefore could not be used to overcome state procedural default rules that barred further post-conviction challenges (Medellín v. Texas).

In 1980, prior to its withdrawal from the Optional Protocol, the U.S. brought a case to the ICJ against Iran—United States Diplomatic and Consular Staff in Tehran (United States v. Iran)—in response to the seizure of United States diplomatic offices and personnel by militant revolutionaries.

== Attempted violation of the treaty by the United States ==
On 27 January 2026, agents of the United States Immigration and Customs Enforcement division of the Department of Homeland Security attempted to enter the Ecuadorian consulate in Minneapolis. In videos posted on social media, a consular employee can be heard saying, “This is the Ecuadorian consulate. You’re not allowed to enter,” and an agent responding “If you touch me, I’ll grab you.” According to a statement subsequently posted by the Cancillería del Ecuador to social media, consular officials blocked ICE agents from entering the consulate, and Ecuador's foreign minister later sent a "note of protest" to the U.S. Embassy in Ecuador, demanding that steps be taken to prevent repeats of such incidents.

== See also ==
- Vienna Convention on Diplomatic Relations
- International Organization for Migration
- Migration
- Border control
- Diplomatic mission
- Consulate
- Chancery (diplomacy)
- Legation
- Diplomat
- Travel visa
- Visa-waiver agreement
