= Capital punishment in the United States =

Without the death penalty: Capital punishment repealed, never instituted, or struck down as unconstitutional (23 states, 4 territories, 1 district) (Note: Map only displays the status of the death penalty for crimes committed in the present and future. Some abolitionist states may still allow one to be sentenced to death for crimes committed before the abolition of the capital punishment in that state, and may still have inmates on death row who at the time of abolition did not have their sentences commuted.) With the death penalty: Capital punishment in statute, but executions formally suspended (6 states) Capital punishment in statute, but no executions within the last 10 years (4 states, 1 territory, military) Capital punishment in statute, but executions informally suspended (1 state) Capital punishment in statute and executions carried out within the last 10 years (16 states, federal government)

Status of capital punishment since 1970 by jurisdiction: Capital punishment abolished or struck down. Capital punishment is a legal penalty.

In the United States, capital punishment (also known as the death penalty) is a legal penalty in 27 states (of which two, Oregon and Wyoming, have no inmates sentenced to death), throughout the country at the federal level, and in American Samoa. (Note: Although capital punishment is, in theory, a legal punishment, there are currently no statutes that govern the execution of a sentence of death, resulting in a situation where life imprisonment is the de facto highest punishment in American Samoa.) It is also a legal penalty for some military offenses. Capital punishment has been abolished in the other 23 states and in the federal capital, Washington, D.C. It is constitutionally permitted only for murder, with permissibility for use for crimes against the state not having been legally decided. Although it is a legal penalty in 27 states, only 21 of them have authority to execute death sentences, with the other 6 subject to moratoriums.

There were no executions in the United States between 1967 and 1977. In 1972, the Supreme Court of the United States struck down capital punishment statutes in Furman v. Georgia, reducing all pending death sentences to life imprisonment. Subsequently, a majority of states enacted new death penalty statutes, and the court affirmed the legality of the practice in the 1976 case Gregg v. Georgia. Since then, more than 8,500 defendants have been sentenced to death; of these, more than 1,605 have been executed. Most executions are carried out by states. Since 1973, at least 200 people sentenced to death have been exonerated, about 2.2% of those sentenced.

In 2019, the Trump administration's Department of Justice announced its plans to resume executions for federal crimes. On July 14, 2020, Daniel Lewis Lee became the first inmate executed by the federal government since 2003. Thirteen federal death row inmates were executed, all under Trump. The last and most recent federal execution during the first Trump administration was of Dustin Higgs, who was executed on January 16, 2021. On July 1, 2021, Attorney General Merrick Garland imposed a moratorium on federal executions. In April 2022, 2,414 people were on federal or state death row.

On December 23, 2024, President Joe Biden commuted the sentences of 37 of the 40 individuals on federal civilian death row to life imprisonment without the possibility of parole; 3 people remain on federal death row. Pursuant to Executive Order 14164, signed by Donald Trump on January 20, 2025, the first day of his second term, then-Attorney General Pam Bondi issued a memorandum on February 5, 2025 that rescinded the Garland moratorium on federal executions. The memorandum also directed the Justice Department to strengthen the death penalty and seek its application by prosecutors whenever reasonable.

Today, laws generally prohibit members of the general public from attending executions in the United States, though journalists and selected individuals may witness them. The last public execution in the U.S. took place in Kentucky on August 14, 1936, before a crowd of 20,000 people. This was followed by a period from 1936 to 1937 during which executions were semi-public, after which most states began requiring executions to be held privately. Timothy McVeigh's 2001 execution was viewed by over 200 people, mainly victims' families, via closed-circuit TV. On October 8, 2026, Secretary of Defense Pete Hegseth announced that the execution of Fort Hood shooter Nidal Hasan would be public and that the execution would be livestreamed. Following widespread domestic and global backlash, President Donald Trump canceled the livestream just a week later.

== History ==
=== British colonial rule ===
Executions in the United States from 1608 to 2020

Capital punishment in the United States can be traced to early colonial Virginia. The first recorded death sentence in the British North American colonies was carried out in 1608 on Captain George Kendall, who was executed by firing squad at the Jamestown colony for spying on behalf of the Spanish government. Executions in colonial America were also carried out by hanging. The hangman's noose was one of the various punishments the Puritans of the Massachusetts Bay Colony applied to enforce religious and intellectual conformity on the whole community.

Pennsylvania was the first colony to narrow the application of capital punishment. In 1682, William Penn’s Great Law limited execution to premeditated murder, and, despite a temporary expansion in 1718, the state had again reserved the death penalty for first-degree murder by 1794.

=== Constitutional law developments ===
The United States developed a movement against capital punishment despite never fully abandoning it. Lawyers, clergy, publishers, writers, and philanthropists sustained this cause from the late eighteenth century onward. Benjamin Rush proposed reforms in the 1790s. Although several states abolished the death penalty in mid-nineteenth century, until the 1960s, "save for a few mavericks, no one gave any credence to the possibility of ending the death penalty by judicial interpretation of constitutional law", according to abolitionist Hugo Bedau. The Supreme Court has never ruled the death penalty to be per se unconstitutional.

Powell v. Alabama (1932) made the first step of what would later be called "death is different" jurisprudence, when it held that any indigent defendant was entitled to a court-appointed attorney in capital cases.

The possibility of challenging the constitutionality of the death penalty became progressively more realistic after the Supreme Court of the United States decided Trop v. Dulles in 1958. The Supreme Court declared explicitly, for the first time, that the Eighth Amendment's cruel and unusual punishment clause must draw its meaning from the “evolving standards of decency that mark the progress of a maturing society,” rather than from its original meaning. This approach built on the Court's earlier statement in Weems v. United States (1910) that the meaning of the Eighth Amendment was “not fastened to the obsolete” but could acquire new meaning “as public opinion becomes enlightened by a humane justice.”

=== Pre-Furman history ===
The history of capital punishment in the United States is closely associated with racial hierarchy, white supremacy and lynching, particularly in the South. The relationship between lynching and the modern death penalty, however, is less straightforward than a general sense of historical continuity might suggest. Both practices have been driven by local political pressures, while racial prejudice and social hierarchies have influenced whom they target.

During Reconstruction, the Black Codes continued the system of social control that had existed under slavery. While the Black Codes allowed racialized punishments through the courts, lynch mobs threatened to take matters into their own hands. Historian Michael Klarman noted that “of the relatively few defendants who were acquitted in mob-dominated trials, several were shot dead before they could leave the courthouse.” In Moore v. Dempsey (1923), the Supreme Court held that mob intimidation had undermined the integrity of the death-penalty prosecutions that followed the 1919 Elaine massacre in Arkansas.

To force confessions from suspects, law-enforcement officials sometimes staged lynchings—or threatened them. In Brown v. Mississippi (1936), the Supreme Court reversed the convictions of three Black men who had been tortured by a mob that included a deputy sheriff, who beat and repeatedly hanged one of them from a tree to force them to confess to murder. The men had been convicted and sentenced to death based on those confessions. The Court held that coerced confessions obtained by torture violated the Due Process Clause of the Fourteenth Amendment.

The Supreme Court also intervened in several Southern cases in which black defendants had been sentenced to death by all-white juries. Norris v. Alabama (1935) reversed the conviction and death sentence of Clarence Norris, one of the Scottsboro Nine, because black citizens had been unlawfully excluded from jury service. Patton v. Mississippi (1947) overturned a capital conviction where the defendant was tried by an all-white jury despite black residents comprising one-third of the county’s population.

The last pre-Furman execution was that of Luis Monge on June 2, 1967.

=== Modern era ===
Modern capital punishment has been marked by racial disparities, including the disproportionate targeting of poorly represented Black defendants convicted of crimes against white victims. Unlike lynching, capital punishment today is debated within a system that offers alternatives to execution, even for heinous crimes. The persistence of capital punishment therefore reflects not only racial and political dynamics but also continuing disagreement over whether those alternatives are adequate.

The modern era of capital punishment in the United States began with Furman v. Georgia (1972), in which the Supreme Court invalidated existing death-penalty statutes and vacated more than 600 death sentences. Over the following four years, 35 states enacted new capital-punishment laws. The replacement of Justice William O. Douglas by then-conservative Justice John Paul Stevens in 1975 shifted the Supreme Court's trends and weakened Furman's prospects of ending the death penalty. In five decisions in 1976, the Court upheld three of the revised statutes and struck down two, establishing the constitutional framework for the post-Furman era.

As American society became more polarized in the mid-1970s, public opinion also divided over capital punishment. The death penalty became an issue during the 1988 presidential election. It came up in the October 13, 1988, debate between the two presidential nominees George H. W. Bush and Michael Dukakis, when Bernard Shaw, the moderator of the debate, asked Dukakis, "Governor, if Kitty Dukakis [his wife] were raped and murdered, would you favor an irrevocable death penalty for the killer?" Dukakis replied, "No, I don't, and I think you know that I've opposed the death penalty during all of my life. I don't see any evidence that it's a deterrent, and I think there are better and more effective ways to deal with violent crime." Bush was elected, and many, including Dukakis himself, cite that remark as the beginning of the end of his campaign.

The early twenty-first century brought growing concern about the reliability of capital punishment. Death-row exonerations intensified calls for safeguards against wrongful executions, prompting at least two states to suspend executions while their systems were reviewed.

==== Capital punishment suspended (1972) ====
In Furman v. Georgia (1972), the U.S. Supreme Court considered a group of consolidated cases. The lead case involved an individual convicted under Georgia's death penalty statute, which featured a "unitary trial" procedure in which the jury was asked to return a verdict of guilt or innocence and, simultaneously, determine whether the defendant would be punished by death or life imprisonment.

In a 5–4 decision, the Supreme Court struck down the impositions of the death penalty in each of the consolidated cases as unconstitutional in violation of the Eighth and Fourteenth Amendments of the United States Constitution. The five justices in the majority did not produce a common opinion or rationale for their decision, however, and agreed only on a short statement announcing the result. The narrowest opinions, those of Byron White and Potter Stewart, expressed generalized concerns about the inconsistent application of the death penalty across a variety of cases, but did not exclude the possibility of a constitutional death penalty law. Three justices raised concerns about racial bias. Thurgood Marshall and William J. Brennan Jr. expressed the opinion that the death penalty was proscribed absolutely by the Eighth Amendment as cruel and unusual punishment.

The Furman decision caused all death sentences pending at the time to be reduced to life imprisonment, and was described by scholars as a "legal bombshell". The next day, columnist Barry Schweid wrote that it was "unlikely" that the death penalty could exist anymore in the United States.

==== Capital punishment reinstated (1976) ====
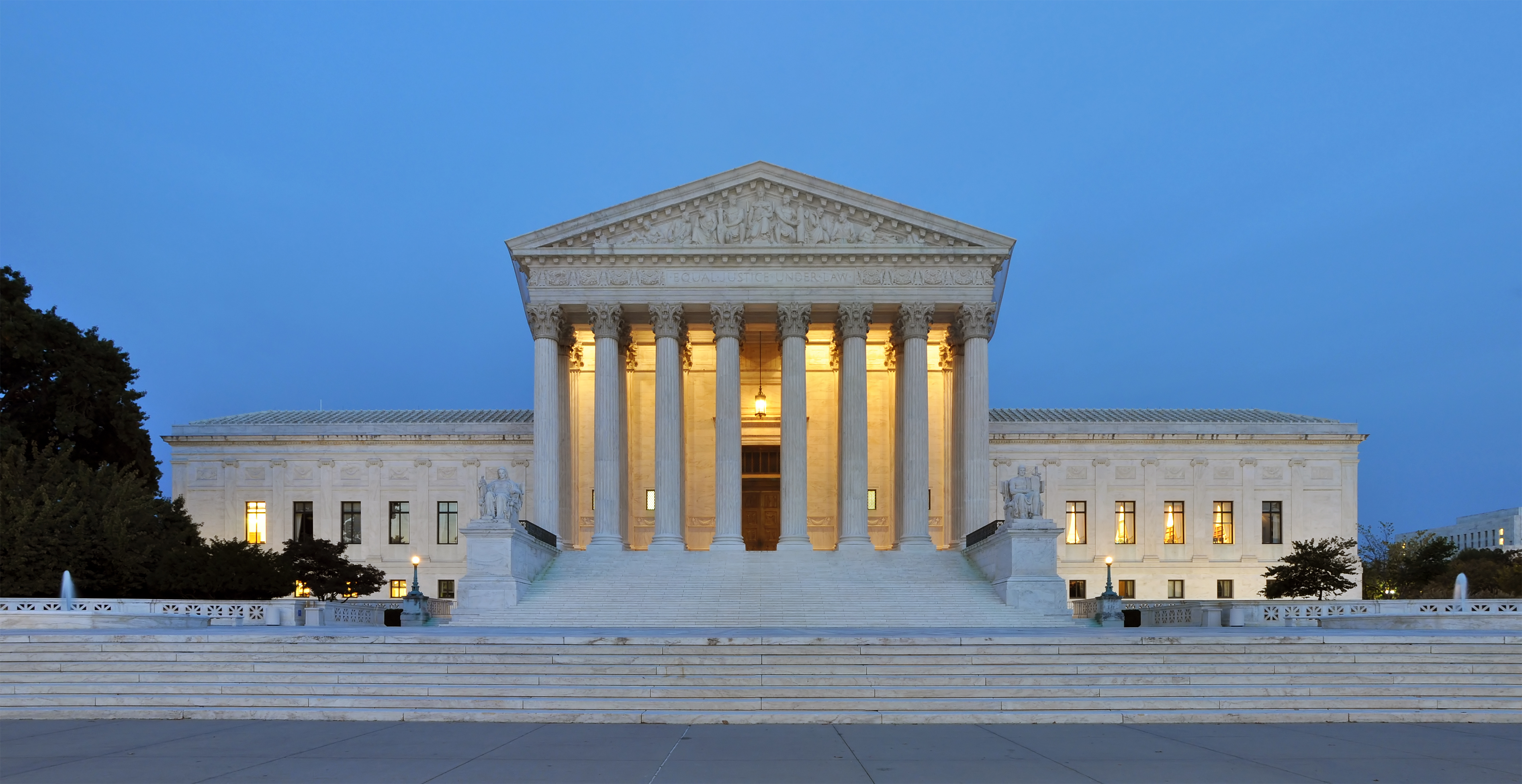
U.S. Supreme Court, Washington, D.C.

In Gregg v. Georgia (1976), the Supreme Court ruled 7–2 that the death penalty was not inherently unconstitutional under the Eighth and Fourteenth Amendments. It upheld Georgia’s revised death-penalty law, finding that its guided sentencing process—including separate guilt and penalty phases, consideration of aggravating and mitigating factors, and appellate review—helped limit arbitrary or disproportionate death sentences.

The Supreme Court upheld three of the new capital sentencing statutes in separate decisions: Gregg v. Georgia (1976), Proffitt v. Florida (1976), and Jurek v. Texas (1976). The Georgia and Florida statutes used "guided discretion" and provided juries with lists of aggravating and mitigating circumstances in a bifurcated proceeding with separate guilt and sentencing phases. The Texas capital sentencing statute, Article 37.071 of the Texas Code of Criminal Procedure, required juries to answer three specific questions ("special issues") before imposing the death penalty. The Supreme Court concluded that these procedures provided adequate safeguards to ensure that juries had clear standards for deciding who should receive the death penalty while allowing individualized consideration of capital cases. These sentencing procedures have since been the subject of multiple Supreme Court cases.

==== Developments in capital sentencing ====
The same day, in Woodson v. North Carolina and Roberts v. Louisiana, the Court struck down 5–4 statutes imposing a death sentence without allowing the sentencer to consider mitigating evidence. Two influential decisions further defined the role of mitigating evidence in capital sentencing. Lockett v. Ohio (1978) invalidated an Ohio law that narrowly restricted the mitigating factors a sentencer could consider, requiring consideration of the defendant's character, record, and circumstances of the offense offered in mitigation. Four years later, Eddings v. Oklahoma (1982) vacated the death sentence of a 16-year-old defendant because the sentencing process did not give mitigating circumstances the required individualized consideration. Godfrey v. Georgia (1980) held that murder can be punished by death only if it involves a narrow and precise aggravating factor.

After these decisions, many principles of criminal procedure were developed or strengthened through litigation in capital cases, including requirements for effective assistance of counsel, disclosure of exculpatory evidence by prosecutors, and prohibitions on racial discrimination in jury selection.

Following a decade-long hiatus in executions, Gary Gilmore became the first person executed in the United States after the U.S. Supreme Court reinstated the constitutionality of capital punishment in 1976. He was executed by firing squad in Utah on January 17, 1977.

Although death sentences increased dramatically, the retroactive application of newly developed procedural rules led to a high rate of reversals. By the late 1970s, federal courts were reversing more than half of the capital cases reviewed through habeas corpus. Only eleven people were executed between 1977 and 1983. The number of executions rose after Barefoot v. Estelle (1983), amid changes in federal habeas proceedings, and averaged nearly 20 per year from 1984 to 1989. From 1996 to 2000, they averaged 74 per year, the highest level since the mid-1950s, and peaked at 98 in 1999. In the early 2000s, concerns about the administration of the death penalty—including evidence that at least 119 people sentenced to death were innocent—contributed to moratoriums in two states. Executions nevertheless averaged about 65 per year from 2001 to 2005.

The Supreme Court's habeas decisions in the 1980s and 1990s focused heavily on capital cases, and federal courts set aside state judgments in capital cases at substantially higher rates than they did in noncapital cases. Margaret Jane Radin coined “super due process” to describe the heightened procedural requirements in capital cases under the “death is different” rationale. The increase in successive habeas petitions prompted concerns that prisoners and their attorneys were manipulating the process through repeated and last-minute filings. Bryan Stevenson has argued that these concerns were overstated, pointing instead to the shortage of funded postconviction counsel, which left a small number of attorneys handling excessive caseloads and scrambling to take cases as execution deadlines approached. Nevertheless, this perception of abuse contributed to political pressure for restrictions that culminated in the Antiterrorism and Effective Death Penalty Act (AEDPA).

AEDPA's new restrictions had a particularly significant effect on capital habeas cases, against a backdrop of continuing debate over federal review and the finality of state-court judgments. In 1995, 21 percent out of the 68 percent death penalty cases which didn't survive postconviction review were reversed through federal habeas corpus. Similarly, a study by Ronald Tabak in a law review article puts the success rate in habeas corpus cases involving death row inmates even higher, finding that between "1976 and 1991, approximately 47 percent of the habeas petitions filed by death row inmates were granted".

==== "Evolving standards of decency" ====
Capital punishment in the United States has undergone significant transformations from its colonial origins to the modern era, with developments influenced by both domestic legal changes and comparative perspectives from other nations.

===== Non-homicide crimes =====
Coker v. Georgia (1977) barred the death penalty for the rape of adult, and Kennedy v. Louisiana (2008) confirmed that the death penalty would not be available for any non-homicide crimes, including child rape.

In Kennedy v. Louisiana (2008), the court also held 5–4 that the death penalty is unconstitutional when applied to non-homicidal crimes against the person, including child rape. Only two death row inmates (both in Louisiana) were affected by the decision. Nevertheless, the ruling came less than five months before the 2008 presidential election and was criticized by both major party candidates Barack Obama and John McCain.

===== Juveniles =====
In 1959, Leonard Shockley was executed in Maryland, becoming the last person in the United States who was executed while still a juvenile at the time of their execution. Thompson v. Oklahoma (1987), overturned William Wayne Thompson's death sentence as cruel and unusual punishment because he was 15 years old when he committed the crime. The Court found that "evolving standards of decency" made the death penalty inappropriate for offenses committed by people under 16 while leaving intact the constitutionality of sentencing juveniles aged 16 or older to death.

It was not until Roper v. Simmons (2005) that juvenile capital punishment was abolished due to the United States Supreme Court finding that the execution of juveniles is in conflict with the Eighth Amendment and Fourteenth Amendment, which deal with cruel and unusual punishment. Prior to completely abolishing juvenile capital punishment in 2005, any juvenile aged 16 years or older could be sentenced to death in some states, the last of whom was Scott Hain, executed at the age of 32 in Oklahoma for the 1987 burning of two people to death during a robbery at age 17. Prior to Roper, there were 71 people on death row in the United States for crimes committed as juveniles. Since 2005, there have been no executions nor discussion of executing juveniles in the United States.

=== Abolition ===
Most abolitionist states had repealed capital punishment by 1965, before crime and urban disorder became major political issues. As of 2025, 23 states and Washington D.C. have repealed the death penalty.

David Jacobs and Jason Carmichael’s research on American states suggests that the death penalty is more likely where social ties are weak. They found it more often in states with higher levels of migration, greater racial polarization, and wider gaps between rich and poor. States with more residential stability are less likely to retain the death penalty, a pattern Jacobs and Carmichael attribute to stronger local ties and greater social cohesion.

The abolition and reform movement was more successful in Europe. Members of the Council of Europe agreed to comply with the European Convention of Human Rights which prohibited capital punishment. The last execution in the UK took place in 1964, and in 1977 in France. Sociologist David Garland attributes the persistence of capital punishment in the United States to a distinctive history of state formation and racial conflict that has fostered high rates of violence, lynching, vigilantism, widespread gun ownership, and a cultural fascination with violence. Garland views American attitudes to capital punishment as a symptom of the "adaptive pattern" shaped by this history of violence and victimization.

==== States that have abolished the death penalty ====
When it abolished the death penalty in 2019, New Hampshire explicitly did not commute the death sentence of the sole person remaining on the state's death row, Michael K. Addison.

State/district/territory	Year	Last execution	Disposition
Alaska	1957	1950	Two years before Alaska became a state in 1959, the bill to abolish the death penalty, sponsored by Vic Fisher and Warren Taylor, was passed in 1957.
Colorado	2020	1997	Governor Jared Polis signed a repeal bill on March 23, 2020, and commuted all existing death sentences in the state to life without parole.
Connecticut	2012	2005	The Connecticut Supreme Court ruled in 2015 that the repeal must be retroactive.
Delaware	2016	2012	Death penalty statute struck down by state supreme court.
District of Columbia	1981	1957	In 1981, the district of Columbia formerly abolished the death penalty with the Repeal Act of 1980.
Hawaii	1957	1947	The death penalty was abolished in 1957 and two years later, Hawaii became a U.S. state in 1959.
Illinois	2011	1999	Governor commuted death sentences after appeal.
Iowa	1965	1963	After previously being abolishing in 1872 and reinstated in 1878, Gov Harold Hughes signed the death penalty abolition in 1965.
Maine	1887	1885	In 1887, the death penalty was permanently banned in Maine after being reinstated in 1876 for first-degree murder.
Maryland	2013	2005	Governor commuted death sentences after appeal.
Massachusetts	1984	1947	The death penalty was abolished in Massachusetts in 1984. There has been multiple attempts to reinstate it, in Governor Romney's proposal in 2005. There has been no success.
Michigan	1847 (1963)	1837	Michigan's 1962 Constitutional Convention codified that the death penalty was fully abolished.
Minnesota	1911	1906	
New Hampshire	2019	1939	State senate overrode Governor Chris Sununu's veto by a vote of 16–8.
New Jersey	2007	1963	Repealed by legislative vote Governor commuted death sentences after appeal.
New Mexico	2009	2001	In New Mexico, capital punishment for certain offenses is still possible for National Guard members in Title 32 status under the state's Code of Military Justice (NMSA 20–12), and for capital offenses committed prior to the repeal of the state's death penalty statute.
New York	2004	1963	Death penalty struck down by New York Court of Appeals as against the state constitution. The state lower house has since blocked all attempts to reinstate the death penalty by adopting a valid sentencing scheme.
North Dakota	1973	1905	
Puerto Rico	1929	1927	
Rhode Island	1984	1845	
Vermont	1964	1954	
Virginia	2021	2017	Governor Ralph Northam signed a repeal bill on March 24, 2021, and commuted all existing death sentences in the state to life without parole.
Washington	2023	2010	In 2018 state supreme court said the death penalty was unconstitutional on the grounds of racial bias. The state later abolished it through legislation passed in 2023.
West Virginia	1965	1959	
Wisconsin	1853	1851	

==== States that have reversed abolition measures ====
Since Furman, 11 states have organized popular votes dealing with the death penalty through the initiative and referendum process. All resulted in a vote for reinstating it, rejecting its abolition, expanding its application field, specifying in the state constitution that it is not unconstitutional, or expediting the appeal process in capital cases.

In 2004, Kansas's capital sentencing schemes was struck down by the states' highest courts. Kansas successfully appealed the Kansas Supreme Court decision to the United States Supreme Court, which reinstated the statute in Kansas v. Marsh (2006).

Nebraska's legislature passed a repeal in 2015, but a referendum campaign gathered enough signatures to suspend it. Capital punishment was reinstated by popular vote on November 8, 2016. The same day, California's electorate defeated a proposal to repeal the death penalty, and adopted another initiative to speed up its appeal process.

=== Federal death penalty ===
On July 25, 2019, Attorney General William Barr ordered the resumption of federal executions after a 16-year hiatus, and set five execution dates for December 2019 and January 2020. After the Supreme Court upheld a stay on these executions, the stay was lifted in June 2020 and four executions were rescheduled for July and August 2020. The federal government executed Daniel Lewis Lee on July 14, 2020. He became the first convict executed by the federal government since 2003. Before Trump's term ended in January 2021, the federal government carried out a total of 13 executions.

=== Women's history and capital punishment ===
In 1632, 24 years after the first recorded male execution in the colonies, Jane Champion became the first woman known to have been lawfully executed. She was sentenced to death by hanging after she was convicted of infanticide; around two-thirds of women executed in the 17th and early 18th centuries were convicted of child murder.

Women accounted for just one fifth of all executions between 1632 and 1759, in the colonial United States. The second half of the 17th century saw the executions of 14 women accused of witchcraft during the witch hunt hysteria and the Salem Witch Trials; 80 percent of the accused were women.

Other notable female executions include Mary Surratt, Velma Barfield, and Wanda Jean Allen. Mary Surratt was executed by hanging in 1865 after being convicted of co-conspiring to assassinate Abraham Lincoln. Margie Velma Barfield was convicted of murder and when she was executed by lethal injection in 1984, she became the first woman to be executed since the ban on capital punishment was lifted in 1976. Wanda Jean Allen was convicted of murder in 1989 and had a high-profile execution by lethal injection in January 2001. She was the first black woman to be executed in the US since 1954. Allen's appellate lawyers did not deny her guilt, but claimed that prosecutors capitalized on her low IQ, race and homosexuality in their representations of her as a murderer at trial. This approach did not work.

In the 20th century in the pre-Furman era (1900 - 1972), there were 38 women executed. The states with the highest numbers of executed women during that period were New York with 7 women (while an 8th woman, Ethel Rosenberg was executed in New York state at Sing Sing Prison in 1953, this was a federal execution), California with 4 women executed (Juanita Spinelli in 1941, Louise Peete in 1947, Barbara Graham in 1955, and Elizabeth Ann Duncan in 1962, with the latter being the last woman executed in any state in the pre-Furman era), and Alabama, Louisiana, Mississippi and Ohio with 3 women each. Notably, there were no executions of women in Texas during that period, and the execution of Karla Faye Tucker in Texas in 1998 was the first execution in Texas in 135 years, since Chipita Rodriguez had been executed in 1863. By contrast, since 1976, one third of all women executed were executed by Texas (see List of women executed in the United States since 1976).

The federal government executes women infrequently. Ethel Rosenberg, convicted of espionage, was executed in the electric chair on 19 June 1953, and Bonnie Brown Heady, convicted of kidnapping and murder, was executed in the gas chamber later that same year on 18 December. Since Heady, only one more woman has been executed by the federal government: Lisa Montgomery, convicted of killing a pregnant woman and cutting out and kidnapping her baby, by lethal injection on 13 January 2021. Her execution had been stayed while her lawyers argued that she had mental health issues, but the Supreme Court lifted the stay.

The second woman, Christa Pike, convicted in 1996 in Tennessee, of first degree murder of a fellow Job Corps dormitory resident, remains on death row. Her execution, scheduled for 30 September 2026, was halted as botched after she survived two lethal injections. To allow for a more thorough review of whether evidence of the sexual abuse of minors was sufficiently taken into account during sentencing, the United States Supreme Court shortly thereafter lifted the stay issued by the Court of Appeals for the Sixth Circuit, thereby authorizing the execution. Pike is hospitalized after two failed lethal injections.

== Methods ==
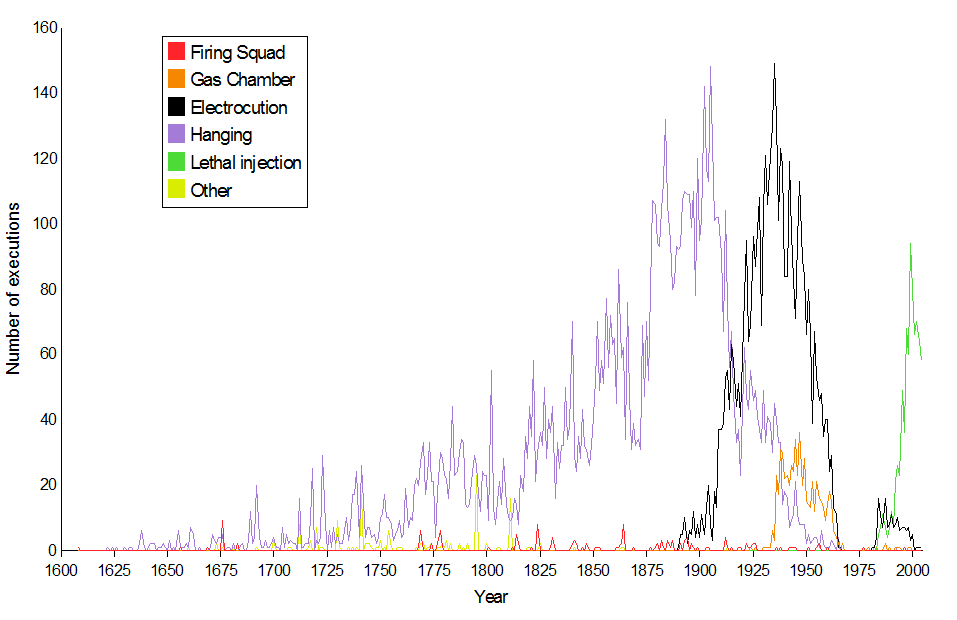
Number of executions each year by the method used in the United States and the earlier colonies from 1608 to 2004.

Usage of lethal injection in the US: State uses only this method. State uses this method primarily but also has other methods. State uses this method as a secondary method. State once used this method, but no longer does. State once adopted this method, but dropped it before its use. State has never adopted this method.

Firing squad usage in the United States: State uses this as a secondary method. State once used this method, but no longer does. State has never used this method.

In 1982, Texas carried out the first execution by lethal injection in world history and lethal injection subsequently became the preferred method throughout the country, displacing the electric chair. From 1976 to March 15, 2026, there were 1,660 executions, of which 1,469 were by lethal injection, 163 by electrocution, 19 by gas, 3 by hanging, and 6 by firing squad.

Of the 27 states with the death penalty, 22 provide lethal injection either as the sole method of execution, or as the primary method applying by default (if available) when the convict does not select one.

The five other states include South Carolina, which provides electrocution as the primary method, and Idaho, which provides firing squad as the primary method, while Louisiana, Mississippi and Missouri allow the department of corrections to select the method.

Several states continue to use the three-drug protocol for lethal injection: firstly an anesthetic, secondly pancuronium bromide, a paralytic, and finally potassium chloride to stop the heart. Eight states have used a single-drug protocol, instead using a single anesthetic.

While some state statutes specify the drugs required in executions, the majority do not.

Electric chair usage in the United States. State uses this method primarily but also has other methods. Secondary method only Previously used, but not presently Never used

Gas chamber usage in the United States. Secondary method only Previously used, but not presently Never used

Pressures from anti-death penalty activists have led to supply-chain disruptions of the chemicals used in lethal injections. Hospira, the only U.S. manufacturer of sodium thiopental, stopped making the drug in 2011, citing "[Hospira] would have to prove that it wouldn’t be used in capital punishment." In 2016, it was reported that more than 20 U.S. and European drug manufacturers including Pfizer (the owner of Hospira) had taken steps to prevent their drugs from being used for lethal injections.

Since then, some states have used other anesthetics, such as pentobarbital, etomidate, or fast-acting benzodiazepines or sedatives like midazolam. In 2009, following the failed execution of Romell Broom, Ohio began using a one drug protocol of thiopental sodium intravenously for lethal injections, or an intramuscular injection of midazolam and hydromorphone if an IV site could not be established.

Many states have since bought lethal injection drugs from foreign suppliers, and most states have made it a criminal offense to reveal the identities of drug suppliers or execution team members. In November 2015, California adopted regulations allowing the state to use its own public compounding pharmacies to make the chemicals.

All executions were suspended through the country between September 2007 and April 2008. At that time, the United States Supreme Court was examining the constitutionality of lethal injection in Baze v. Rees. This was the longest period with no executions in the United States since 1982. Lethal injection was held to be a constitutional method of execution by the U.S. Supreme Court in three cases: Baze v. Rees (2008), Glossip v. Gross (2015), and Bucklew v. Precythe (2019).

=== State-selected methods ===
In the following states, the method is selected by the department of corrections among:

- Lethal injection and gas chamber in Missouri
- Lethal injection, nitrogen hypoxia and electrocution in Louisiana
- Lethal injection, nitrogen hypoxia, electrocution and firing squad in Mississippi

=== Offender-selected methods ===
In the following states, death row inmates with an execution warrant may choose to be executed by a way other than the state default-method:

- Nitrogen hypoxia in Alabama
- Gas chamber in California
- Electrocution in Alabama and Florida
- Lethal injection or firing squad in South Carolina

In five states an alternate method (firing squad in Utah, gas chamber in Arizona, and electrocution in Arkansas, Kentucky and Tennessee) is possible only when the inmate was sentenced to death for crimes committed prior to a specified date (usually when the state switched from the earlier method to lethal injection). In states that abolished death penalty, people sentenced to death for a crime before the date of the abolition may retroactively be subjected to death penalty. Those states' methods are:

- lethal injection in Colorado
- lethal injection in New Hampshire, unless this method is "impractical", in which case hanging would be the method

The most recent executions by methods other than injection are as follows (all chosen by the inmate):

Method	Date	State	Inmate
Firing squad	November 14, 2025	South Carolina	Stephen Corey Bryant
Nitrogen hypoxia	October 23, 2025	Alabama	Anthony Todd Boyd
Electrocution	February 20, 2020	Tennessee	Nicholas Todd Sutton
Gas chamber	March 3, 1999	Arizona	Walter Bernhard LaGrand
Hanging	January 25, 1996	Delaware	Billy Bailey

=== Backup methods ===
Depending on the state, the following alternative methods are statutorily provided in case the primary method is either found unconstitutional by a court or unavailable for practical reasons:

- Nitrogen hypoxia in Alabama and Oklahoma
- Lethal Injection in Idaho
- Gas chamber in California and Wyoming
- Electrocution in Arkansas, Florida, Kentucky, Oklahoma and Tennessee
- Firing squad in Oklahoma, South Carolina and Utah
- Hanging in New Hampshire (where repeal of the death penalty in 2019 is not retroactive, and the state still has one death row inmate)

Several states including Oklahoma, Tennessee and Utah, have added back-up methods recently (or have expanded their application fields) in reaction to the shortage of lethal injection drugs.

Some states such as Alabama, Florida and Tennessee have a larger provision dealing with execution methods unavailability, requiring their state departments of corrections to use "any constitutional method" if both lethal injection and electrocution are found unconstitutional. This was designed to make unnecessary any further legislative intervention in that event, but the provision applies only to legal (not practical) infeasibility.

Oklahoma became in 2015 the first state to have adopted the nitrogen option. After struggling for years to design a nitrogen execution protocol and to obtain a proper device for it, Oklahoma announced in February 2020 it abandoned the project after finding a new reliable source of lethal injection drugs and has since resumed executions.

In March 2018, Alabama became the third state (after Oklahoma and Mississippi) to make nitrogen hypoxia available, and became the first when it successfully executed Kenneth Eugene Smith at William C. Holman Correctional Facility.

=== Federal executions ===
The method of execution of federal prisoners for offenses under the Violent Crime Control and Law Enforcement Act of 1994 is that of the state in which the conviction took place. If the state has no death penalty, the judge must choose a state with the death penalty for carrying out the execution.

The federal government has a facility (at U.S. Penitentiary Terre Haute) and regulations only for executions by lethal injection, but the United States Code allows U.S. Marshals to use state facilities and employees for federal executions.

=== Military courts ===
The method of execution for death sentences imposed by military courts is lethal injection, and the Bureau of Prisons agreed to let the U.S. Armed Forces use its civilian facility for that purpose.

== Capital crimes ==
=== Aggravated murder ===
Aggravating factors for seeking capital punishment of murder vary greatly among death penalty states. California has twenty-two. Some aggravating circumstances are nearly universal, such as robbery-murder, murder involving rape of the victim, and murder of an on-duty police officer.

Several states have included child murder to their list of aggravating factors, but the victim's age under which the murder is punishable by death varies. In 2011, Texas raised this age from six to ten.

In some states, the high number of aggravating factors has been criticized on account of giving prosecutors too much discretion in choosing cases where they believe capital punishment is warranted. In California especially, an official commission proposed, in 2008, to reduce these factors to five (multiple murders, torture murder, murder of a police officer, murder committed in jail, and murder related to another felony). Columnist Charles Lane went further, and proposed that murder related to a felony other than rape should no longer be a capital crime when there is only one victim killed.

==== Aggravating factors in federal court ====
In order for a person to be eligible for a death sentence when convicted of aggravated first-degree murder, the jury or court (when there is not a jury) must determine at least one of sixteen aggravating factors that existed during the crime's commission. The following is a list of the 16 aggravating factors under federal law.

1. The murder was committed while committing another felony.
2. Offender was convicted of a separate felony involving a firearm prior to the aggravated murder.
3. Being convicted of a separate felony where death or life imprisonment was authorized prior to the aggravated murder.
4. Being convicted of any separate violent felony prior to the aggravated murder.
5. The offender put the lives of one or more other persons in danger of death during the commission of the crime.
6. The offender committed the crime in an especially cruel, heinous, or depraved manner.
7. The offender paid another party to commit the murder.
8. The offender received payment for committing the murder.
9. The murder was committed after significant premeditation or planning.
10. The offender was previously convicted of at least two drug offenses.
11. The victim would not have been able to defend themselves while being attacked.
12. The offender was previously convicted of a federal drug offense.
13. The offender was involved in a long-term business of selling drugs to minors.
14. A high-ranking official was murdered, such as the president of the United States, the leader of another country, or a police officer.
15. The offender was previously convicted of sexual assault or child rape.
16. During the crime's commission, the offender killed or tried to kill multiple people.

=== Crimes against the state ===
The opinion of the court in Kennedy v. Louisiana says that the ruling does not apply to "treason, espionage, terrorism, and drug kingpin activity, which are offenses against the State".

Treason, espionage and large-scale drug trafficking are all capital crimes under federal law. Treason is also punishable by death in six states (Arkansas, California, Georgia, Louisiana, Mississippi, and South Carolina). Large-scale drug trafficking is punishable by death in two states (Florida and Missouri), and aircraft hijacking in two others (Georgia and Mississippi). Vermont has an invalidated pre-Furman statute allowing capital punishment for treason despite abolishing capital punishment in 1965.

== Legal process ==
The legal administration of the death penalty in the United States typically involves five steps: prosecutorial decision to seek the death penalty, sentencing, direct review, state collateral review, and federal habeas corpus. Since Furman v. Georgia (1972), capital punishment in the United States has typically involved a lengthy postconviction review process. In 2007, the average interval between sentencing and execution was just over twelve years. The persistence of racial disparities, summary proceedings, and inadequate legal representation in modern capital cases is difficult to reconcile with the reforms promised after Furman. These weaknesses in the process have been documented by bodies such as the U.S. General Accounting Office and the American Bar Association.

=== Decision to seek the death penalty ===
While judges in criminal cases can usually impose a harsher prison sentence than the one demanded by prosecution, the death penalty can be handed down only if the prosecutor has specifically decided to seek it.

In the decades since Furman, new questions have emerged about whether or not prosecutorial arbitrariness has replaced sentencing arbitrariness. A study by Pepperdine University School of Law published in Temple Law Review, surveyed the decision-making process among prosecutors in various states. The authors found that prosecutors' capital punishment filing decisions are marked by local "idiosyncrasies", and that wide prosecutorial discretion remains because of overly broad criteria. California law, for example, has 22 "special circumstances", making nearly all first-degree murders potential capital cases.

A 2016 study by Harvard Law School's Fair Punishment Project found that five prosecutors had been responsible for at least 440 death sentences in their counties, amounting to roughly one in seven prisoners then awaiting execution in the United States. The study highlighted substantial variation in the use of the death penalty among counties, including within states that authorized capital punishment. This variation was consistent with Stephen Breyer's observation that the imposition of the death penalty could depend heavily on the county in which a defendant was tried, raising questions about the fairness of its application.

A proposed remedy against prosecutorial arbitrariness is to transfer the prosecution of capital cases to the state attorney general.

In 2017, Florida governor Rick Scott removed all capital cases from local prosecutor Aramis Ayala because she decided to never seek the death penalty no matter the gravity of the crime.

=== Sentencing ===
Of the 27 states with the death penalty, 25 require the sentence to be decided by the jury, and 23 require a unanimous decision by the jury.

Two states do not use juries in death penalty cases:

- In Nebraska the sentence is decided by a three-judge panel, which must unanimously agree on death, and the defendant is sentenced to life imprisonment if one of the judges is opposed.
- Montana is the only state where the trial judge decides the sentence alone.

Two states do not require a unanimous jury decision:

- In Alabama, at least 10 jurors must concur, and a retrial happens if the jury deadlocks.
- In Florida, at least 8 jurors (two-thirds) must concur, and the prosecution can pursue a retrial if the jury deadlocks.

In all states in which the jury is involved, only death-qualified prospective jurors can be selected in such a jury, to exclude both people who will always vote for the death sentence and those who are categorically opposed to it. However, the states differ on what happens if the penalty phase results in a hung jury:

- In five states (Alabama, Arizona, California, Kentucky and Nevada), a retrial of the penalty phase will be conducted before a different jury (the common-law rule for mistrial).
- In two states (Indiana and Missouri), the judge will decide the sentence.
- In the remaining states, a hung jury results in a life sentence, even if only one juror opposed death. Federal law also provides that outcome.

The first outcome is referred as the "true unanimity" rule, while the third has been criticized as the "single-juror veto" rule.

In most jurisdictions, capital cases are conducted in two distinct phases: a guilt phase, during which the jury determines whether the defendant committed the charged offense, and a penalty phase, where sentencing considerations such as aggravating and mitigating factors are evaluated.

=== Direct review ===
If a defendant is sentenced to death at the trial level, the case then goes into a direct review. The direct review process is a typical legal appeal. An appellate court examines the record of evidence presented in the trial court and the law that the lower court applied and decides whether the decision was legally sound or not. Direct review of a capital sentencing hearing will result in one of three outcomes. If the appellate court finds that no significant legal errors occurred in the capital sentencing hearing, the appellate court will affirm the judgment, or let the sentence stand. If the appellate court finds that significant legal errors did occur, then it will reverse the judgment, or nullify the sentence and order a new capital sentencing hearing. If the appellate court finds that no reasonable juror could find the defendant eligible for the death penalty, then it will order the defendant acquitted, or not guilty, of the crime for which he/she was given the death penalty, and order him sentenced to the next most severe punishment for which the offense is eligible. In 1995, about 60 percent of capital punishment decisions were upheld during direct review.

=== State collateral review ===
At times when a death sentence is affirmed on direct review, supplemental methods to oppose the judgment, though less familiar than a typical appeal, do remain. These supplemental remedies are considered collateral review, that is, an avenue for upsetting judgments that have become otherwise final. Where the prisoner received his death sentence in a state-level trial, as is usually the case, the first step in collateral review is state collateral review, which is often called state habeas corpus. (If the case is a federal death penalty case, it proceeds immediately from direct review to federal habeas corpus.) Although all states have some type of collateral review, the process varies widely from state to state. Generally, the purpose of these collateral proceedings is to permit the prisoner to challenge his sentence on grounds that could not have been raised reasonably at trial or on direct review. Most often, these are claims, such as ineffective assistance of counsel, which requires the court to consider new evidence outside the original trial record, something courts may not do in an ordinary appeal. State collateral review, though an important step in that it helps define the scope of subsequent review through federal habeas corpus, is rarely successful in and of itself. In 1995, out of the roughly 47% cases which didn't survive postconviction review at the state level, 6 percent of death sentences were overturned on state collateral review.

To reduce litigation delays, other states require convicts to file their state collateral appeal before the completion of their direct appeal, or provide adjudication of direct and collateral attacks together in a "unitary review".

=== Federal habeas corpus ===
Federal habeas corpus is a type of collateral review, and it is the only way that state prisoners may attack a death sentence in federal court (other than petitions for certiorari to the United States Supreme Court after both direct review and state collateral review). The purpose of federal habeas corpus is to ensure that state courts, through the process of direct review and state collateral review, have done a reasonable job in protecting the prisoner's federal constitutional rights. Prisoners may also use federal habeas corpus suits to bring forth new evidence that they are innocent of the crime, though to be a valid defense at this late stage in the process, evidence of innocence must be truly compelling.

AEDPA created a separate expedited habeas procedure for capital cases, with shorter filing and processing deadlines. The procedure was available only to states that provided qualified and experienced counsel in state postconviction proceedings, with the aim of making state review more thorough and reducing the need for lengthy federal habeas proceedings. Congress amended the provisions in the PATRIOT Reauthorization Act. The changes conferred the determination of whether a state fulfilled the requirements to the U.S. attorney general, with a possible appeal of the state to the United States Court of Appeals for the District of Columbia Circuit. In May 2026, the Department of Justice issued a new rule implementing the amended provisions to fast-track executions.

=== Section 1983 ===
The Civil Rights Act of 1871 – codified at 42 U.S.C. § 1983 – allows complainants to bring lawsuits against state actors to protect their federal constitutional and statutory rights.

While direct appeals are normally limited to just one and automatically stay the execution of the death sentence, Section 1983 lawsuits are unlimited, but the petitioner will be granted a stay of execution only if the court believes he has a likelihood of success on the merits.

Traditionally, Section 1983 was of limited use for a state prisoner under sentence of death because the Supreme Court has held that habeas corpus, not Section 1983, is the only vehicle by which a state prisoner can challenge his judgment of death. In the 2006 Hill v. McDonough case, however, the United States Supreme Court approved the use of Section 1983 as a vehicle for challenging a state's method of execution as cruel and unusual punishment in violation of the Eighth Amendment. The theory is that a prisoner bringing such a challenge is not attacking directly his judgment of death, but rather the means by which that the judgment will be carried out. Therefore, the Supreme Court held in the Hill case that a prisoner can use Section 1983 rather than habeas corpus to bring the lawsuit. Yet, as Clarence Hill's own case shows, lower federal courts have often refused to hear suits challenging methods of execution on the ground that the prisoner brought the claim too late and only for the purposes of delay.

=== Execution warrant ===
While the execution warrant is issued by the governor in several states, in the vast majority it is a judicial order, issued by a judge or by the state supreme court at the request of the prosecution.

The warrant usually sets an execution day. Some states instead provide a longer period, such as a week-long or 10-day window to carry out the execution. This is designated to avoid issuing a new warrant in case of a last-minute stay of execution that would be vacated only few days or few hours later.

== Distribution of sentences ==
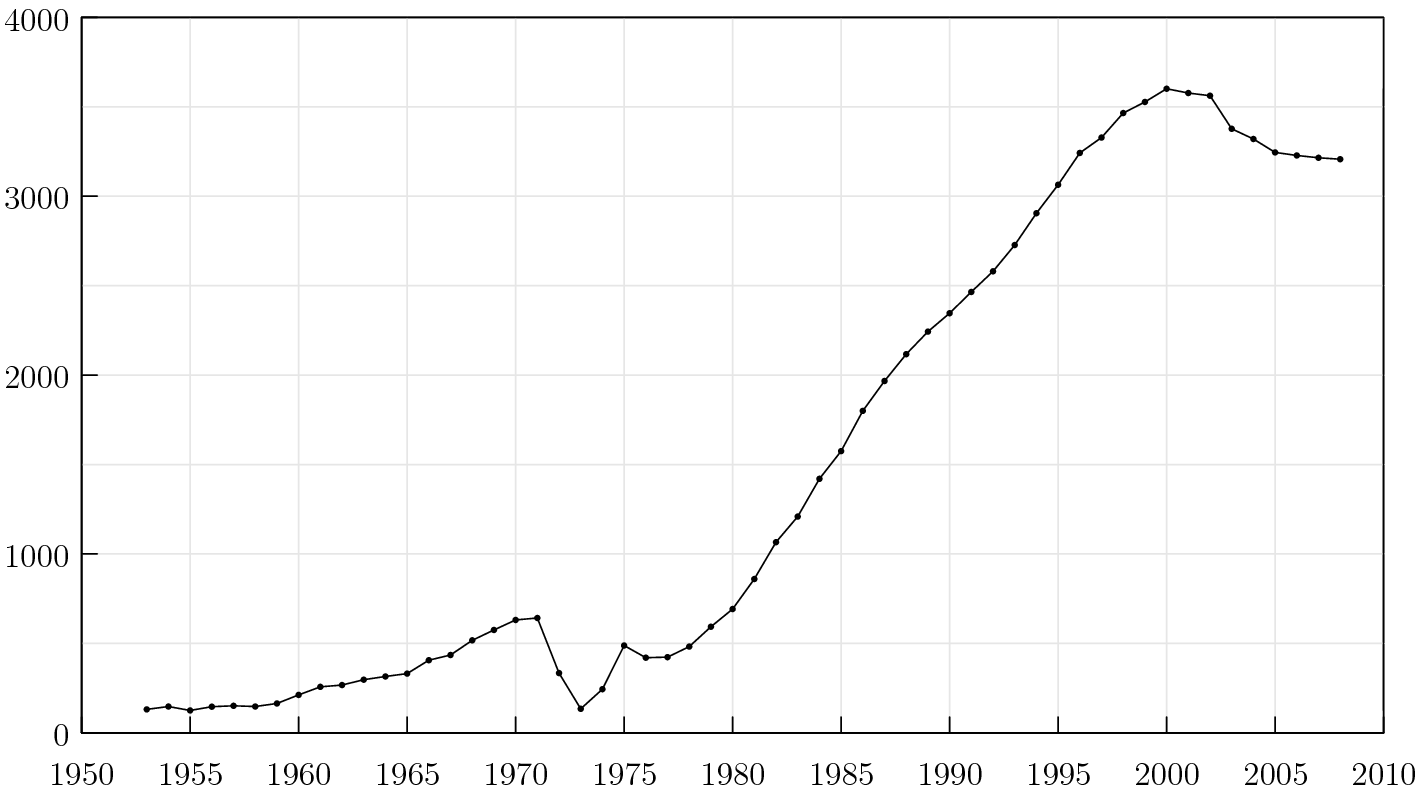
Total number of prisoners on death row in the United States from 1953 to 2008

In recent years there has been an average of one death sentence for every 200 murder convictions in the United States.

The majority of death row inmates have a prior felony conviction.

According to the Death Penalty Information Center, the top three factors determining whether a convict gets a death sentence in a murder case are not aggravating factors, but instead the location the crime occurred (and thus whether it is in the jurisdiction of a prosecutor aggressively using the death penalty), the quality of legal defense, and the race of the victim (murder of white victims being punished more harshly).

=== Economic factors ===
Economic factors affect the outcome of capital cases. Empirical research has linked erroneous death sentences to inadequate legal representation, which can disproportionately affect defendants who cannot afford private counsel. Limited resources may hinder defense attorneys' ability to investigate and present mitigating evidence, potentially affecting the jury's sentencing decision.

=== Women ===
Women account for a small share of death sentences, death-row prisoners, and executions in the United States. Most women executed at the state level were executed in Texas, Oklahoma, or Florida. As of May 20, 2021, the Death Penalty Information Center reports that there are 51 women on death row. 17 women have been executed since 1976, compared to 1,516 men during the same time period.

=== Race ===
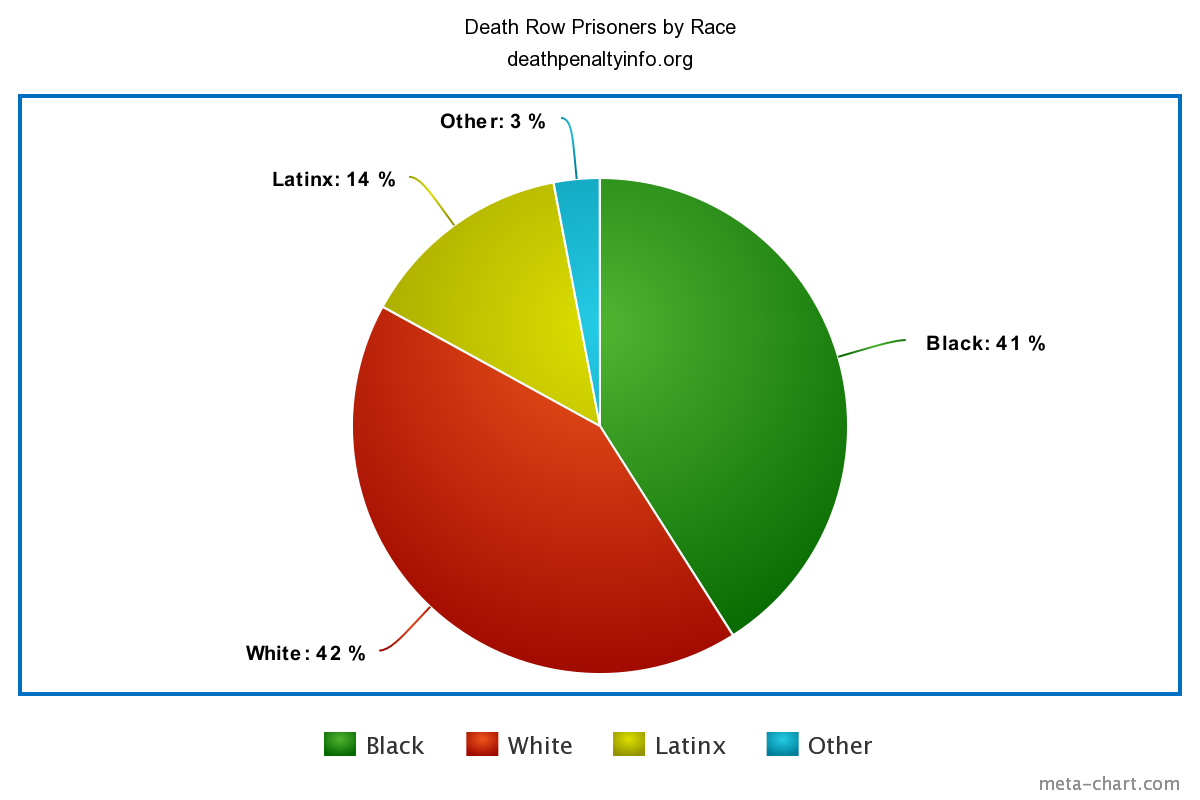
Racial demographic of death row inmates in the U.S.

African Americans accounted for 34 percent of people executed since 1976, while Whites accounted for 56 percent. Black people accounted for 40 percent of those sentenced to death, compared with 42 percent for Whites. Black and Latino people are disproportionately represented among those sentenced to death relative to their shares of the population.

Since January 1, 1973, 108 out of the 200 total exonerations have been African Americans. African Americans account for about 54% of all exonerations. 54 percent of people wrongfully convicted and sentenced to death in the United States are black; 64 percent are non-white in general.

In a 1998 study, David Baldus and George Woodworth found that Black defendants were nearly four times as likely to receive a death sentence as otherwise comparable defendants. Some researchers have attributed this disparity in part to the racial composition of prosecutors in death penalty jurisdictions, who are overwhelmingly white men.

Approximately 13.5% of death row inmates are of Hispanic or Latino descent. In 2019, individuals identified as Hispanic and Latino Americans accounted for 5.5% of homicides. The death penalty exhortation rate for Hispanic and Latino Americans is 8.6%.

Approximately 1.81% of death row inmates are of Asian descent.

==== Race of victims ====
Legal scholar Tanya Kateri Hernandez examined McCleskey v. Kemp (1987) in the context of unconscious racial bias in capital sentencing. The Baldus study, introduced by McCleskey, found that the race of the victim was a significant factor in death sentencing outcomes in Georgia, with cases involving white victims more likely to result in a death sentence. The U.S. Supreme Court acknowledged that the victim's race was the most influential factor identified by the study but held that the statistical disparity did not establish intentional discrimination in McCleskey's particular case.

African Americans account for approximately 50 percent of murder victims. Among those sentenced to death, however, about 80 percent were sentenced for killing white victims. A 2007 study of 1,560 people sentenced to death in 16 states found that Black defendants who killed white victims were more likely to be executed.

==== Racial breakdown of sentences by state ====
The geographic distribution of capital punishment in the United States has a strong correlation with the history of slavery and lynchings. States where slavery was legal before the Civil War also saw high numbers of lynchings after the Civil War and into the 20th century. These states include Alabama, Arkansas, Florida, Georgia, Kentucky, Louisiana, Mississippi, North Carolina, South Carolina, and Tennessee. These states also have the highest rates of capital punishment sentences and executions today.

The racial makeup of the people sentenced to death reveals a disproportionate representation of Black people. Consider the following states with the highest execution rates per capita (defined as executions per 100,000 residents):

State	Rate of execution per capita (per 100,000 residents)	Number of executions since 1976	Total population	Percent of state population that is Black	Percent of those on death row who are Black	Percent of exonerated people sentenced to death that are Black
Oklahoma	2.83	112	3,986,639	7.8	40.5	54.6
Texas	1.97	570	29,527,941	13.2	45.2	18.8
Delaware (since abolished)	1.64	16	1,003,384	23.6	N/A	100 (Note: Only one confirmed innocent person sentenced to death in Delaware post-1976.)
Missouri	1.47	90	6,168,187	11.8	30	75
Alabama	1.37	67	5,039,877	26.8	48.2	42.6

=== Among states ===
The absolute number of people on death row, in 2024, per US State. As of September 12, 2024

The relative number of people on death row, per 10,000,000 inhabitants, in 2024, per US State. As of September 12, 2024

The Southern United States has carried out more executions than any other region, followed by the Midwest. Texas has carried out 596 executions—more than one-third of the national total. Together, Texas, Florida, and Oklahoma account for more than half of all executions. No state in the Northeast has carried out an execution since Connecticut did so in 2005; Connecticut has since abolished capital punishment.

17 executions have been conducted by the federal government.

Capital punishment is still in force in 26 states, which include the following: Alabama, Arizona, Arkansas, California, Florida, Georgia, Idaho, Indiana, Kansas, Kentucky, Louisiana, Mississippi, Missouri, Montana, Nebraska, Nevada, North Carolina, Ohio, Oklahoma, Pennsylvania, South Carolina, South Dakota, Tennessee, Texas, Utah, Wyoming. Of these, Oklahoma, Texas, Delaware, Missouri, and Alabama make up the top five states with the highest rate of executions per capita. However, Texas, Oklahoma, Virginia, Florida, and Missouri are the top five states with the highest number of executions–Texas alone has imposed 570 executions since 1976.

The distribution of death sentences among states is loosely proportional to their populations and murder rates. Wyoming, which is the least populous state, has nobody on death row.

But executions are more frequent (and happen more quickly after sentencing) in conservative states. Texas, which is the second most populous state in the Union, carried out over 500 executions during the post-Furman era, more than a third of the national total. California has carried out only 13 executions during the same period, and has carried out none since 2006.

==== Alabama ====
Capital punishment in Alabama: The state continues to have one of the nation's highest rates of death sentences per capita. As of April 1, 2022, there are currently 80 Black people and 84 white people on death row. Though the Black and white populations are both about half of the total death row population in Alabama, Black people are represented at a disproportionately high number considering they make up only 27% of Alabama's general population.

Alabama has the highest per capita rate of death sentences. This is because Alabama was one of the few states that allowed judges to override a jury recommendation in favor of life imprisonment, a possibility it removed in March 2017.

==== Texas ====
Capital punishment in Texas: Texas is the state with the highest number of cumulative executions since 1976. Black people make up about 45% of the death row population in Texas, though only make up about 13% of the state's general population.

==== Oklahoma ====
Capital punishment in Oklahoma: Oklahoma is the state with the second highest number of cumulative executions since 1976. Black people make up 46% of death sentences in Oklahoma County, though only make up 16% of the county's total population.

It is also the only state that has four methods of execution, while most others only have one or two methods. These methods of execution include lethal injection, nitrogen hypoxia, electrocution, and firing squad.

==== Virginia ====
Capital punishment in Virginia: The death penalty in Virginia came to an end on March 24, 2021, when the state became the second Southern state to abolish the death penalty (West Virginia having been the first, in 1965). Prior to abolition, Virginia had some of the most executions out of any state since 1976, as well as the most executions overall in the pre-Furman v. Georgia era. It is also the latest state to abolish death penalty. Virginia has the shortest time on average between death sentence and execution (less than eight years) and has executed 113 offenders since 1976 with only five remaining on death row as of June 2017.

== Notable capital punishment cases ==
=== Barbara Graham ===
Barbara Graham’s case became controversial because of doubts about whether she was directly involved in the murder for which she was executed. One witness, John True, later admitted that he had lied after being pressured by police, and another account suggested that Graham had been elsewhere at the relevant time. Critics also argued that she was convicted largely on circumstantial evidence and inconsistent testimony. Her defenders maintained that, whatever her role in the wider criminal group, there was insufficient proof that she took part in the killing itself.

These doubts made her execution a prominent example in arguments against capital punishment, particularly where convictions rest on unreliable witnesses or incomplete evidence.

=== Caryl Chessman ===
Caryl Chessman’s case became controversial because California used its “Little Lindbergh Law” to make kidnapping with bodily harm a capital offense, even though neither victim was killed. The court ruled that two alleged sexual assaults met this definition, making Chessman eligible for execution.

During nearly twelve years on death row, Chessman filed repeated appeals and narrowly avoided execution eight times, while his books and public campaign attracted international attention and widespread calls for clemency from writers, intellectuals, and public figures, including Aldous Huxley, Ray Bradbury, Norman Mailer, Robert Frost, Eleanor Roosevelt, Marlon Brando, and Billy Graham.

=== Danny Rolling ===
Media coverage of Danny Rolling’s 2006 execution presented it as a case of a particularly brutal offender being brought to justice through established legal procedures. Florida Governor Jeb Bush called Rolling a “poster child” for the death penalty. Advocacy groups nevertheless challenged the appropriateness of his sentence, emphasizing his abusive childhood and emotional immaturity. Evidence at his 1994 trial indicated that his emotional development at the time of the crimes was comparable to that of a 15-year-old and that he suffered from extreme emotional disturbance. Advocates sought a change of venue so that these mitigating circumstances and alternatives to the death penalty would receive greater consideration. The case thus showed how a prosecution presented as a straightforward example of criminal justice could still prompt objections based on the offender’s background and psychological development.

=== George Stinney Jr. ===
In 1944, 14-year-old African-American George Stinney Jr. was convicted of murdering two white girls. He was the youngest person in the United States to be sentenced to death. Stinney was executed by electrocution within 80 days of the murders. In 2014, Stinney's convictions were vacated and he was exonerated on the grounds that his 6th amendment rights had been violated. It was found Stinney's interrogation had included coercion, and an absence of counsel and of parental guidance. Police said that Stinney had confessed, but no signed confession was ever produced. The Judge who overturned the conviction wrote that: "Stinney's appointed counsel made no independent investigation, did not request a change of venue or additional time to prepare the case, he asked little or no questions on cross-examination of the State's witnesses and presented few or no witnesses on behalf of his client based on the length of trial. He failed to file an appeal or a stay of execution." Stinney's sister said in a 2009 affidavit that she was with Stinney on the day of the murders, but she was never called to testify during the trial.

=== John Wayne Gacy ===
John Wayne Gacy was convicted in 1980 of murdering 33 young men and boys in Illinois between 1972 and 1978, making his conviction at the time the largest number of homicides attributed to a single individual in U.S. legal history. Gacy was sentenced to death and executed by lethal injection at Stateville Correctional Center on May 10, 1994.

=== Lena Baker ===
Lena Baker was a Black woman who was wrongfully convicted of the murder of her abuser in 1945. In Georgia, Baker served as a maid for a handicapped white man; she faced regular sexual and physical abuse from him. Despite the town terrorizing Baker to leave the relationship, her abuser would equally threaten her with violence if she ever left. Weeks before his death, he started holding Baker prisoner in his gristmill for numerous days. Baker was able to escape the mill, but when she came back, her abuser threatened her with an iron bar. After a struggle, Baker took ahold of his pistol and shot the man in self-defense.

The all-white, all-male jury did not empathize with Baker's case of self-defense as a survivor of her slave-like conditions, including sexual and physical abuse. In less than a day, the jury found Baker guilty of capital murder, which happened to result in a mandatory death sentence in Georgia at the time. After failed appeals, reviews, and the abandonment of her legal representation, Lena Baker was executed by electrocution in 1945. About 60 years following Baker's death, her family, with the help of the Prison and Jail Project, requested a posthumous pardon. Their efforts succeeded in 2005 when Baker was granted a full and unconditional pardon from the Georgia Board of Pardons and Paroles because there was a lack of evidence to demonstrate Baker's intent to kill. If the justice system had been careful with the evidence, they would have noted Baker's conviction did not qualify as capital murder and should have resulted in a sentence other than the death penalty.

=== Roger Coleman ===
Roger Coleman was convicted in 1982 of the rape and murder of his sister-in-law and sentenced to death. He maintained his innocence throughout his incarceration, and his claims became the subject of extensive media coverage and support from opponents of the death penalty. His appeals included efforts to obtain a new trial, but he was executed in 1992. The case received renewed attention after his execution when DNA evidence was analyzed, making it only the second case in the United States in which DNA testing was conducted on evidence from an executed prisoner. In January 2006, Virginia Governor Mark Warner announced that the testing had conclusively established Coleman's guilt.

=== Perry Smith and Richard Hickock ===
Perry Edward Smith and Richard Hickock were executed in Kansas in 1965 for the 1959 murders of the Clutter family in Holcomb, Kansas—the case later made famous by Truman Capote’s In Cold Blood. Although their guilt was not seriously disputed, and the evidence against them was extensive, their case became prominent in debates over mental illness and rehabilitation, in part because of because of Capote’s portrayal of them as deeply damaged individuals shaped by trauma, neglect, and psychological instability rather than simply as calculating killers.

=== Sacco and Vanzetti ===
Nicola Sacco and Bartolomeo Vanzetti were Italian immigrants and anarchists who were convicted in 1921 of murdering a guard and a paymaster during a 1920 armed robbery in Braintree, Massachusetts. Their trial and conviction became internationally controversial amid allegations of anti-Italian, anti-immigrant, and anti-anarchist prejudice, as well as conflicting evidence and claims of wrongful conviction. Appeals and other efforts to obtain a new trial were unsuccessful, and the two men were executed in the electric chair at Charlestown State Prison on August 23, 1927. Their case generated worldwide protests and remained the subject of controversy after their deaths. In 1977, Massachusetts Governor Michael Dukakis issued a proclamation stating that they had been unfairly tried and convicted.

=== Ted Bundy ===
Ted Bundy was convicted of multiple murders in Florida and sentenced to death. After escaping custody twice while facing murder charges in Colorado, Bundy fled to Florida, where he committed three murders for which he received three death sentences in two trials. He was executed in the electric chair at Florida State Prison on January 24, 1989.

=== Timothy McVeigh ===
Timothy McVeigh was convicted of the Oklahoma City bombing, which killed 168 people, including 19 children, and injured hundreds more. McVeigh, a Gulf War veteran who had developed antigovernment views, said he intended the bombing as retaliation for the federal government's actions at the Waco siege and Ruby Ridge. He was convicted in 1997 of federal offenses including using a weapon of mass destruction and sentenced to death. McVeigh was executed by lethal injection at the Federal Correctional Complex in Terre Haute, Indiana, on June 11, 2001. He was the first person executed by the federal government since 1963 and did not pursue further appeals or seek a stay of execution.

=== Troy Davis ===
Troy Davis was convicted of the 1989 murder of police officer Mark MacPhail in Savannah, Georgia, and sentenced to death in 1991. Seven prosecution witnesses testified that they had seen Davis shoot MacPhail, while two others testified that Davis had confessed. The murder weapon was never recovered, although ballistic evidence linked bullets found at the scene to another shooting for which Davis was convicted. Davis maintained his innocence throughout his incarceration, and his case attracted support from human rights organizations, public figures, and political and religious leaders. After several scheduled executions were stayed, the Supreme Court of the United States ordered an evidentiary hearing in 2010 to consider new evidence concerning his innocence. The federal district court upheld the conviction, finding that several witness affidavits did not constitute recantations and that the evidence did not clearly establish Davis's innocence. After subsequent appeals and a request for clemency were denied, Davis was executed by lethal injection in Georgia on September 21, 2011.

=== Nidal Hasan ===
Nidal Hasan is set to be killed on December 3, 2026 in Fort Hood, Texas. He would be the first person executed by the military via firing squad since 1945, and the first executed by the military via any official means since 1961. Secretary of defense Pete Hegseth has emphatically stated that the execution will be made public and livestreamed as a show of force. On October 15, 2026, President Donald Trump said the execution of Nidal Hasan would not be livestreamed.

== Execution attendance ==
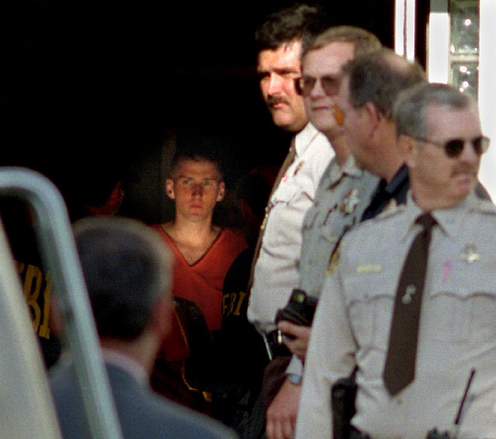
The over 200 witnesses to the execution of Timothy McVeigh were mostly survivors and victims' relatives of the Oklahoma City bombing.

The last public execution in the U.S. was that of Roscoe Jackson in Galena, Missouri, on May 21, 1937.

It was the last execution in the nation at which the general public was permitted to attend without any legally imposed restrictions. "Public execution" is a legal phrase, defined by the laws of various states, and carried out pursuant to a court order. Similar to "public record" or "public meeting", it means that anyone who wants to attend the execution may do so.

Around 1890, a political movement developed in the United States to mandate private executions. Several states enacted laws which required executions to be conducted within a "wall" or "enclosure", or to "exclude public view". Most state laws currently use such explicit wording to prohibit public executions, while others do so only implicitly by enumerating the only authorized witnesses.

All states allow news reporters to be execution witnesses for information of the general public, except Wyoming which allows only witnesses authorized by the condemned. Several states also allow victims' families and relatives selected by the prisoner to watch executions. An hour or two before the execution, the condemned is offered religious services and to choose their last meal (except in Texas which abolished it in 2011).

The execution of Timothy McVeigh on June 11, 2001, was witnessed by over 200 people, most by closed-circuit television. Most were survivors, or relatives of victims of, the 1995 Oklahoma City Bombing, for which McVeigh had been sentenced to death.

== Debate ==
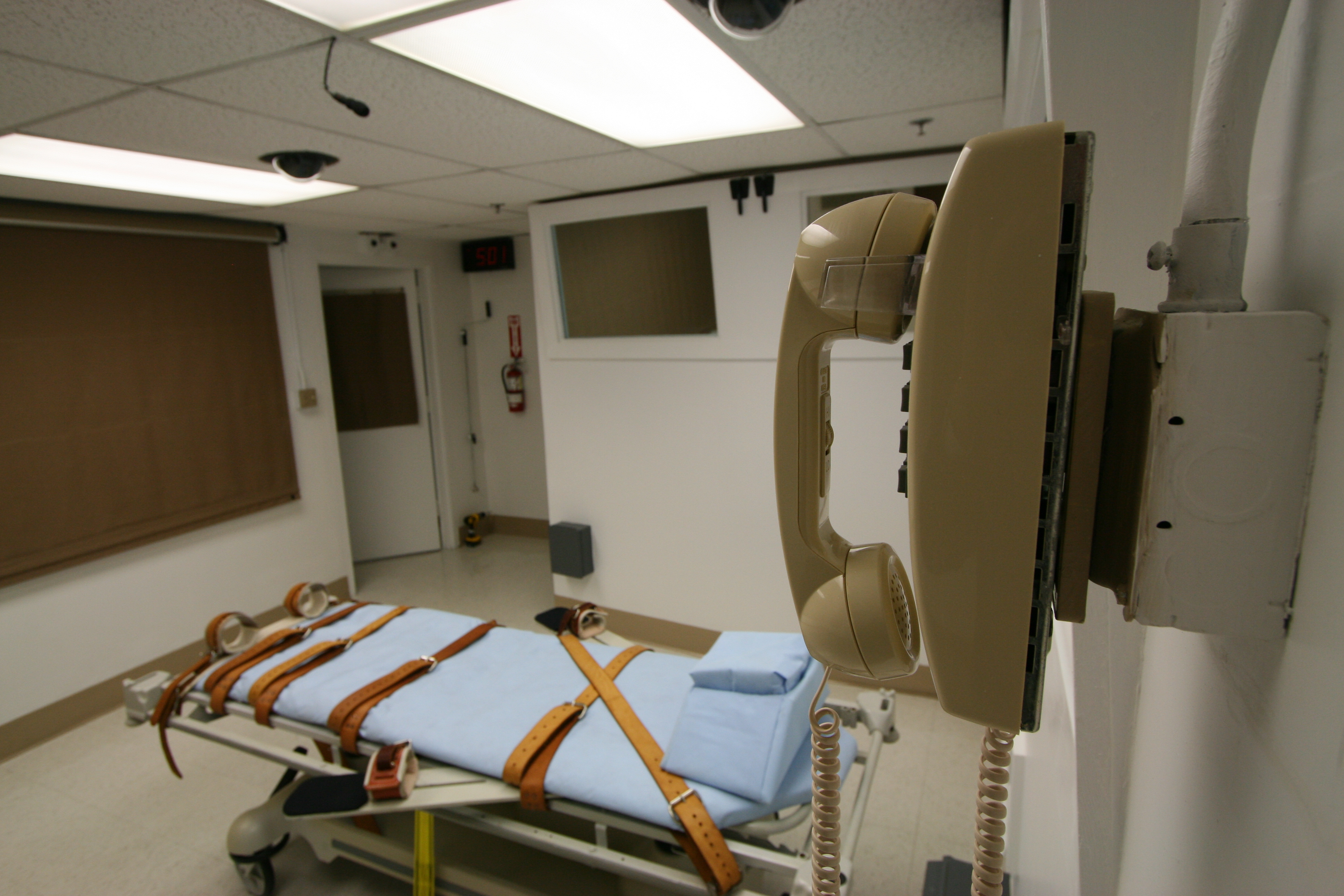
The lethal injection room in the Florida State Prison

In October 2009, the American Law Institute voted to disavow the framework for capital punishment that it had created in 1962, as part of the Model Penal Code, "in light of the current intractable institutional and structural obstacles to ensuring a minimally adequate system for administering capital punishment". A study commissioned by the institute had said that experience had proved that the goal of individualized decisions about who should be executed and the goal of systemic fairness for minorities and others could not be reconciled. As of 2017, 159 prisoners have been exonerated due to evidence of their innocence.

Additionally, in 2021–22, states such as South Carolina have experienced a shortage of the drugs used to make the lethal cocktail and some inmates have had to choose between death by electric chair or death by firing squad (aiming for the heart). Critics note that these other methods are more likely to induce pain in the inmate during execution and that these methods of execution have a high risk of being botched.

=== Botched executions ===
One of the main arguments against the use of capital punishment in the United States is that there has been a long history of botched executions. University of Colorado Boulder Professor Michael L. Radelet described a "botched execution" as an execution that causes the prisoner to suffer for a long period of time before they die.

A study found that at least 34 of the 749 executions carried out in the U.S. between 1977 and 2001, or 4.5%, involved "unanticipated problems or delays that caused, at least arguably, unnecessary agony for the prisoner or that reflect gross incompetence of the executioner". The rate of these "botched executions" remained steady over the period. A study published in The Lancet in 2005 found that in 43% of cases of lethal injection, the blood level of hypnotics in the prisoner was insufficient to ensure unconsciousness. Nonetheless, the Supreme Court ruled in 2008 (Baze v. Rees), again in 2015 (Glossip v. Gross), and a third time in 2019 (Bucklew v. Precythe), that lethal injection does not constitute cruel and unusual punishment.

=== Cost ===
Another argument in the capital punishment debate is the cost. Because death penalty cases are highly specialized, with defense counsel performing duties and functions that differ from those in ordinary criminal cases, representing a capital defendant competently requires substantially greater resources. The need for extensive investigation into a defendant's personal history and background, and the complexity of the law make capital cases more difficult to litigate than ordinary criminal trials. Many states provide no counsel for capital prisoners in state post-conviction proceedings, while inadequate funding, standards, and qualified attorneys in other states have limited the effectiveness of representation. The failure to provide adequate funding does not eliminate the costs of capital litigation but shifts them to capital defendants, who bear the consequences of inadequate representation, and to pro bono lawyers and other defense professionals who provide services that states otherwise would have to fund.

=== Inadequate legal representation ===
Inadequate legal representation has been identified as a significant problem in capital cases. Congress defunded postconviction defender organizations in 1996, while many states continued to provide inadequate funding for capital defense and appointed lawyers with limited experience or disciplinary histories. Reports from Tennessee, Georgia, and Pennsylvania documented failures to investigate capital cases and present potentially mitigating evidence, as well as the appointment of inexperienced counsel. The American Bar Association identified inadequate and undercompensated counsel as a principal failing of the capital punishment system. Supreme Court decisions including Williams v. Taylor (Michael Williams) (2000), Wiggins v. Smith (2003), and Rompilla v. Beard (2005) subsequently found ineffective assistance of counsel in capital cases, including failures to investigate and present mitigating evidence during sentencing.

A study led by Professor James S. Liebman examined death sentences from 1973 to 1995. It found that appellate courts reversed 68 percent of those sentences because of serious, reversible trial-level error. The study highlighted ineffective assistance of counsel as a major cause of wrongful death sentences. Among cases that survived state direct appeal, 40 percent of those reviewed at the federal habeas stage were reversed. Ineffective assistance of counsel was the leading cause of reversal at the later review stages, accounting for 39 percent of reversals at the state post-conviction stage and 27 percent of reversals at the federal habeas stage.

=== Post-conviction innocence claims ===
In 2009, the Supreme Court held that there is no constitutional right to post-conviction DNA testing for convicted prisoners. Forty-eight states have post-conviction DNA testing statutes. However, fewer than half the states have statutes that give inmates time and money for post-conviction DNA testing. There is widespread public support for such a system.

=== Deterrence theory of punishment ===
Critics of deterrence theory argue that the modern American death penalty does not reliably serve its stated purposes. Sociologist Thorsten Sellin contended that capital punishment performed none of the utilitarian functions claimed by its supporters, while historian Gary Wills argued that it had become largely symbolic rather than an effective instrument of penal justice. Empirical research has not established that capital punishment deters homicide: the National Research Council concluded in 2012 that existing studies could not determine whether the death penalty decreases, increases, or has no effect on homicide rates.

=== Opponents ===
Amnesty International opposes capital punishment because it breaches human rights, in particular the right to life and the right to live free from torture or cruel, inhuman or degrading treatment or punishment. Other groups oppose capital punishment on moral grounds.

Groups like the NAACP's Legal Defense Fund (LDF) and the Equal Justice Initiative have continuously worked and continue to work on abolishing capital punishment based on its historically racist associations with enslavement and lynching, and also its disproportionate impact on racial minority communities.

Reform Judaism has formally opposed the death penalty since 1959, when the Union of American Hebrew Congregations (now the Union for Reform Judaism) resolved "that in the light of modern scientific knowledge and concepts of humanity, the resort to or continuation of capital punishment either by a state or by the national government is no longer morally justifiable." The resolution goes on to say that the death penalty "lies as a stain upon civilization and our religious conscience." In 1979, the Central Conference of American Rabbis, the professional arm of the Reform rabbinate, resolved that, "both in concept and in practice, Jewish tradition found capital punishment repugnant" and there is no persuasive evidence "that capital punishment serves as a deterrent to crime."

The Fiqh Council of North America, a group of Muslim scholars in the United States, has issued a fatwa calling for a moratorium on capital punishment in the United States until various preconditions in the legal system are met.

The advocacy group Conservatives Concerned About the Death Penalty is creating a national network of Republican and Libertarian legislators at the state level to introduce bills aimed at abolishing or limiting the death penalty. The issue is framed along the values of pro-life, limited government, and fiscal responsibility.

=== Supporters ===
Advocates of the death penalty say that it deters crime, is a good tool for prosecutors in plea bargaining, improves the community by eliminating recidivism by executed criminals, provides "closure" to surviving victims or loved ones, and is a just penalty.

Some law enforcement organizations and some victims' rights groups support capital punishment.

== Public opinion ==
Gallup, Inc. has monitored support for the death penalty in the United States since 1937. Gallup surveys documented a sharp increase in support for capital punishment between 1966 (42%) and 1994 (80%). In the late 1990s, support began to wane. Support continued to fall through 2024 (53%) and 2026 (49%).

Support levels vary depending on the question's wording. When asked in 2019 by Gallup to choose which do they think is the better penalty for murder, 36% of polled persons selected the death penalty, and 60% life imprisonment with absolutely no possibility of parole. This was the highest percentage choosing life without parole since the first time the question was asked in 1985.

Pew Research polls have measured in 2020 support for the death penalty to be 65% when a panel responds to a self-administered online survey, and 52% when asked by live telephone interviewers. The gap between the two methods was wider for Democratic-leaning voters, with 32% of them approving capital punishment by phone and 49% online, compared to a difference of 74% versus 83% for Republican-leaning voters.

In 2021, Ipsos conducted a multinational online survey on capital punishment among 55 countries. It showed 67% of Americans favoring the death penalty, more than any European Union country, but lower than Japan and South Korea.

A 2019 study for the Rose Institute of State and Local Government surveyed respondents online about specific crimes. The two receiving the highest support for a capital sentence were raping and murdering a child (80%) and killing dozens of people as part of a terrorist attack (75%). The two that received the lowest support were killing someone after breaking into their home (52%) and killing someone in the course of a robbery (49%).

== Clemency and commutations ==
Clemency, through which the governor or president of the jurisdiction can unilaterally reduce or abrogate a death sentence, is an executive rather than judicial process.

In death penalty states, the governor usually has the discretionary power to commute a death sentence or to stay its execution. In some states the governor is required to receive an advisory or binding recommendation from a separate board. In a few states like Georgia, the board decides alone on clemency. At the federal level, the power of clemency belongs to the President of the United States.

In January 2003, outgoing Governor of Illinois George Ryan, who had already imposed a moratorium on executions, pardoned four death-row inmates and commuted the sentences of the remaining 167 to life in prison without the possibility of parole. At the time, it was the largest commutation of death sentences in U.S. history. When Governor Pat Quinn signed legislation abolishing the death penalty in Illinois in March 2011, he commuted the sentences of the fifteen inmates on death row to life imprisonment.

Previous post-Furman mass clemencies took place in 1986 in New Mexico, when Governor Toney Anaya commuted all death sentences because of his personal opposition to the death penalty rendering it unenforceable in the state and paving the way for its eventual abolition in 2009. In 1991, outgoing Ohio Governor Dick Celeste commuted the sentences of eight prisoners, among them all four women on the state's death row thus postponing the resumption of death penalty until the early 21st century. And during his two terms (1979–1987) as Florida's governor, Bob Graham, although a strong death penalty supporter who had overseen the first post-Furman involuntary execution as well as 15 others, agreed to commute the sentences of six people on the grounds of doubts about guilt or disproportionality.

On December 14, 2022, outgoing Oregon governor Kate Brown commuted the death sentences of all 17 inmates on Oregon's death row to life imprisonment without parole, citing the death penalty's status as "an irreversible punishment that does not allow for correction [...] and never has been administered fairly and equitably" and calling it "wasteful of taxpayer dollars" while questioning its ability to function as a deterrence to crime. Governor Brown also ordered the dismantling of Oregon's lethal injection chamber and death row. Prior, Oregon had an ongoing official moratorium set by prior governor John Kitzhaber in 2011 and had not carried out any executions since that of Harry Charles Moore in 1997; furthermore, in 2019, the Oregon State Senate amended the state's death penalty statutes to significantly reduce the number of crimes that warranted the death penalty, thereby invalidating many of the state's active death sentences. In 2021, David Ray Bartol's death sentence was overturned on the grounds of it being a "disproportionate punishment" in violation of Oregon's state constitution, which death penalty experts and abolitionist advocates said would provide the rationale for the eventual overturning of every other death sentence in Oregon. Brown is the third Oregon governor to commute every standing death sentence in the state, after Governor Robert D. Holmes, who commuted every death sentence passed during his tenure from 1957 to 1959, and Governor Mark Hatfield, who commuted every death sentence in the state after Oregon temporarily abolished the death penalty in accordance with a statewide vote in 1964.

In November 2026, outgoing Governor of California Gavin Newsom announced his intention to commute the sentences of all 548 death row inmates in his state to life in prison. Newsom can only unilaterally commute 166 of those sentences, as the California Supreme Court must approve the commutations of 382 death row prisoners with multiple felony convictions. If approved in full, this will be the largest mass commutation of death sentences in U.S history and reduce the number of death row inmates in the country by nearly a third. That December, 30 district attorneys across California sued to overturn Newsom's clemency, arguing that he abused his power and did not give sufficient notice to victims' families.

== Exonerations and moratoria ==
The 1995 O. J. Simpson trial contributed to growing public distrust of the criminal justice system by focusing attention on failures in criminal investigations and trial proceedings. Public support for the death penalty also declined during this period, with Gallup reporting a decrease between 1994 and June 2000. In June 2000, Columbia University law professor James Liebman and colleagues released the first installment of a study examining error rates in capital cases.

The debate over executions intensified in 2000 amid concerns about wrongful convictions and the reliability of capital Illinois halted executions in 2000 after 13 death-row prisoners were found to have been wrongfully convicted. In 2003, Governor George Ryan commuted the sentences of more than 160 death-row prisoners, stating "I no longer shall tinker with the machinery of death." Other developments included calls for a nationwide moratorium by televangelist broadcaster Pat Robertson and a 30-day stay of execution issued by Texas governor George W. Bush for Ricky McGinn to allow further consideration of DNA evidence in his case.

These developments came amid growing bipartisan concern about the accuracy of capital convictions, including calls for expanded DNA testing. Public concern about wrongful convictions was reflected in changing attitudes toward capital punishment. Although 66% of Americans still supported the death penalty, down from 80% in 1994, 92% supported making DNA testing available to people convicted before the science was available. DNA evidence had led to the release of 72 prisoners, including eight convicted of capital crimes. The ongoing debate encompassed racial and economic disparities in sentencing and concerns about inadequate legal representation.

As of 2026, the Death Penalty Information Center’s Innocence Database lists 203 people exonerated from death row in the United States since 1973. Not all of these exonerations established factual innocence. Advances in DNA evidence proving the factual innocence of exonerated death-row prisoners influenced public attitudes toward capital punishment.

In addition to the states that have no valid death penalty statute, the following 11 states and 2 jurisdictions either have an official moratorium on executions or have had no executions for more than ten years as of 2026:

Jurisdiction	Status	Moratorium or review status
Military	de facto	No executions since 1961.
American Samoa	de facto	No method of execution defined by law. No executions since gaining self-governance in 1949. There are no prisoners under a sentence of death in the territory.
California	by governor and court order	On March 13, 2019, Governor Gavin Newsom set a moratorium. There has also been a court ordered moratorium on executions in effect since December 15, 2006.
Idaho	de facto	No executions since 2012. Two execution warrants scheduled in 2024, but failed and stayed.
Kansas	de facto	Kansas has had no executions since 1965. Kansas restored the death penalty in 1994 but no death row inmates have exhausted their appeals.
Kentucky	by court order	In 2009, a state judge suspended executions pending a new protocol.
Montana	by court order	In 2015, a state judge ruled the state's lethal injection protocol is unlawful, stopping executions.
Nevada	de facto	No executions since 2006.
North Carolina	by implementers	Executions are suspended following a decision by the state's medical board that physicians cannot participate in executions, which is a requirement under state law.
Ohio	de facto	In 2020, Governor Mike DeWine set an informal moratorium. The state will no longer use lethal injection, but state law does not specify any other method of execution.
Oregon	by governor	In 2011, Governor John Kitzhaber set a moratorium and a review. There are no prisoners under a sentence of death in the state.
Pennsylvania	by governor	In 2015, Governor Tom Wolf set a moratorium. In 2023, Josh Shapiro continued the moratorium.
Wyoming	de facto	Wyoming has had no executions since 1992. There are no prisoners under a sentence of death in the state.

Since 1976, four states have only executed condemned prisoners who voluntarily waived any further appeals: Pennsylvania has executed three inmates, Oregon two, Connecticut one, and New Mexico one. In the last state, Governor Toney Anaya commuted the sentences of all five condemned prisoners on death row in late 1986.

In California, United States District Judge Jeremy Fogel suspended all executions in the state on December 15, 2006, ruling that the implementation used in California was unconstitutional but that it could be fixed. California Governor Gavin Newsom declared an indefinite moratorium on March 13, 2019; he also ordered the closure and dismantling of the death chamber. In 2023, Governor Newsom ordered the relocation of death row inmates out of death row and to different prisons across the country "to phase out the practice of segregating people on death row based solely on their sentence", although no inmates were offered commutations or re-sentencing hearings related to these developments. Relocated death row inmates who obtained jobs in prison would have 70 percent of their earnings sent to their victims' families.

The CDCR says the move allows the state "to phase out the practice of segregating people on death row based solely on their sentence". No inmates will be re-sentenced and no death row commutations offered, officials say.

On November 25, 2009, the Kentucky Supreme Court affirmed a decision by the Franklin County Circuit Court suspending executions until the state adopts regulations for carrying out the penalty by lethal injection.

In November 2011, Oregon Governor John Kitzhaber announced a moratorium on executions in Oregon, canceling a planned execution and ordering a review of the death penalty system in the state.

On February 13, 2015, Pennsylvania Governor Tom Wolf announced a moratorium on the death penalty. Wolf will issue a reprieve for every execution until a commission on capital punishment, which was established in 2011 by the Pennsylvania State Senate, produces a recommendation. The state had not executed anyone since Gary M. Heidnik in 1999.

On July 25, 2019, U.S. Attorney General William Barr announced that the federal government would resume executions using pentobarbital, rather than the three-drug cocktail previously used. Five convicted death row inmates were scheduled to be executed in December 2019 and January 2020. On November 20, 2019, U.S. District Judge Tanya Chutkan issued a preliminary injunction preventing the resumption of federal executions. Plaintiffs in the case argued that the use of pentobarbital may violate the Federal Death Penalty Act of 1994. The stay was lifted in June 2020 and four executions were rescheduled for July and August 2020. On July 14, 2020, Daniel Lewis Lee was executed. He became the first convict executed by the federal government since 2003. Overall, thirteen federal prisoners were executed during the presidency of Donald Trump between July 2020 and January 2021. The last convict executed was Dustin Higgs on January 16, 2021. On July 1, 2021, U.S. Attorney General Merrick Garland halted all federal executions pending review of the changes made under the Trump administration.

On January 20, 2025, Donald Trump issued Executive Order 14164 as one of many presidential orders he issued on the first day of his second term. It requests that the Attorney General, and thus the Department of Justice, pursue the death penalty in all federal cases whose severity makes its use appropriate. The order also requests that, whenever legal and appropriate, the Justice Department "pursue Federal jurisdiction and seek the death penalty" for the specific federal capital offenses of murder of a law enforcement officer as well as any capital crimes committed by illegal aliens in the US. On February 5, 2025, U.S. Attorney General Pam Bondi formally rescinded the Biden administration's moratorium on the federal death penalty. Bondi also stated the Justice Department's intention to strengthen the death penalty and seek to apply it whenever appropriate for a capital crime, and to assist states in the implementation of death sentences.

== Execution statistics ==
A total of 1693 people have been executed in the United States since the US Supreme Court resumed executions in 1976. The Espy file, compiled by M. Watt Espy and John Ortiz Smykla, lists 15,269 people executed in the United States and its predecessor colonies between 1608 and 1991. From 1930 to 2002, there were 4,661 executions in the United States; about two-thirds of them in the first 20 years. Additionally, the United States Army executed 160 soldiers between 1942 and 1961, the most recent being John A. Bennett.

Annual execution totals in the United States have been shaped by shifts in the legal rules governing capital cases. Between 1976 and 1983, courts imposed heightened procedural safeguards—often described as “super due process”—which slowed the pace of executions. After 1983, many of these procedural requirements were relaxed, contributing to a rise in annual totals. Executions increased in frequency until 1999; 98 prisoners were executed that year.

Since 1999, the number of executions has greatly decreased, and the 17 executions in 2020 were the fewest since 1991. A 2016 poll conducted by Pew Research, found that support nationwide for the death penalty in the U.S. had fallen below 50% for the first time since the beginning of the post-Gregg era.

After years of a steady decline of executions, executions in 2025 have increased dramatically over previous years. Forty-seven people, all male, were executed in the United States in 2025, thirty-nine by lethal injection, five by nitrogen hypoxia, and three by firing squad. The number of executions in 2025 became the highest number to be carried out in the United States in 16 years.

- First execution: Gary Mark Gilmore on January 17, 1977
- Last execution: Reinaldo Dennes on November 19, 2026

Gender
Male	1675	98.9%
Female	18	1.1%
Ethnicity
White	949	56.1%
Black	574	33.9%
Hispanic	138	8.2%
Native American	22	1.3%
Asian	7	0.4%
Arab	2	0.1%
Pacific Islander	1	0.1%
Method
Lethal injection	1502	88.7%
Electrocution	163	9.6%
Gas chamber	11	0.6%
Nitrogen hypoxia	8	0.5%
Firing squad	6	0.4%
Hanging	3	0.2%
State
Texas	605	35.7%
Florida	145	8.6%
Oklahoma	133	7.9%
Virginia	113	6.7%
Missouri	102	6%
Alabama	86	5.1%
Georgia	77	4.5%
Ohio	56	3.3%
South Carolina	50	3%
Arizona	43	2.5%
North Carolina	43	2.5%
Arkansas	31	1.8%
Louisiana	29	1.7%
Mississippi	25	1.5%
Indiana	24	1.4%
Tennessee	17	1%
Delaware	16	0.9%
Federal Government	16	0.9%
California	13	0.8%
Illinois	12	0.7%
Nevada	12	0.7%
Utah	8	0.5%
Maryland	5	0.3%
South Dakota	5	0.3%
Washington	5	0.3%
Nebraska	4	0.2%
Idaho	3	0.2%
Kentucky	3	0.2%
Montana	3	0.2%
Pennsylvania	3	0.2%
Oregon	2	0.1%
Colorado	1	0.06%
Connecticut	1	0.06%
New Mexico	1	0.06%
Wyoming	1	0.06%
Decade
1970–1979	3	0.2%
1980–1989	117	6.9%
1990–1999	478	28.2%
2000–2009	590	34.8%
2010–2019	324	19.1%
2020–2029	181	10.7%
Age
20–29	123	7.3%
30–39	577	34%
40–49	555	32.8%
50–59	293	17.3%
60–69	116	6.9%
70–79	27	1.6%
80–89	2	0.1%
Total	1693	100%

Executions by year (since 1977)
1977	1978	1979	1980	1981	1982	1983	1984	1985	1986	1987	1988	1989	1990	1991	1992	1993	1994
1	0	2	0	1	2	5	21	18	18	25	11	16	23	14	31	38	31
1995	1996	1997	1998	1999	2000	2001	2002	2003	2004	2005	2006	2007	2008	2009	2010	2011	2012
56	45	74	68	98	85	66	71	65	59	60	53	42	37	52	46	43	43
2013	2014	2015	2016	2017	2018	2019	2020	2021	2022	2023	2024	2025	2026				
39	35	28	20	23	25	22	17	11	18	24	25	47	39				

== See also ==
- Capital punishment by the United States federal government
- Capital punishment by the United States military
- Capital punishment debate in the United States
- Felony murder and the death penalty in the United States
- List of United States Supreme Court decisions on capital punishment
- List of last executions in the United States by crime
- List of people executed in the United States in 2026
- List of people scheduled to be executed in the United States
- Lists of people executed in the United States (1900–1972)
- Lists of people executed in the United States since 1976
- List of people executed by the United States federal government
- List of people executed by the United States military
- List of death row inmates in the United States
- List of women on death row in the United States
- List of death row inmates in the United States who have exhausted their appeals
- List of wrongful convictions in the United States
- Capital punishment in California

== Explanatory notes ==
f. California has the largest death row population in the western hemisphere. In 2016 voters rejected a proposal to abolish the death penalty. Los Angeles County has the most people on Death row in the country while Riverside County has the largest death row population per capita in the country.
