= McCleskey v. Kemp =

- Supreme Court of the United States

Argued October 15, 1986 Decided April 22, 1987
- Full case name: Warren McCleskey v. Kemp, Superintendent, Georgia Diagnostic and Classification Center
- Citations: 481 U.S. 279 (more) 107 S. Ct. 1756; 95 L. Ed. 2d 262; 1987 U.S. LEXIS 1817; 55 U.S.L.W. 4537

Case history
- Prior: McCleskey v. Zant, 580 F. Supp. 338 (N.D. Ga. 1984); affirmed in part, reversed in part sub. nom., McCleskey v. Kemp, 753 F.2d 877 (11th Cir. 1985); cert. granted, 478 U.S. 1019 (1986).

Holding
- Despite the presentation of empirical evidence that asserted racial disparity in application of the death penalty, aggregate evidence is insufficient to invalidate an individual defendant's death sentence.

Court membership
- Chief Justice William Rehnquist Associate Justices William J. Brennan Jr. · Byron White; Thurgood Marshall · Harry Blackmun; Lewis F. Powell Jr. · John P. Stevens; Sandra Day O'Connor · Antonin Scalia

Case opinions
- Majority: Powell, joined by Rehnquist, White, O'Connor, Scalia
- Dissent: Brennan, joined by Marshall; Blackmun, Stevens (in part)
- Dissent: Blackmun, joined by Marshall, Stevens; Brennan (in part)
- Dissent: Stevens, joined by Blackmun

Laws applied
- U.S. Const. amend. XIV

McCleskey v. Kemp, 481 U.S. 279 (1987), is a United States Supreme Court case, in which the death sentence of Warren McCleskey for armed robbery and murder was upheld. The Court said the "racially disproportionate impact" in the Georgia death penalty indicated by a comprehensive scientific study was not enough to mitigate a death penalty determination without showing a "racially discriminatory purpose." McCleskey has been described as the "most far-reaching post-Gregg challenge to capital sentencing."

McCleskey has been named as one of the worst Supreme Court decisions since World War II by a Los Angeles Times poll of liberal jurists. In a New York Times comment eight days after the decision, Anthony Lewis charged that the Supreme Court had "effectively condoned the expression of racism in a profound aspect of our law." Anthony G. Amsterdam called it "the Dred Scott decision of our time." Justice Lewis Powell wrote the majority opinion and when asked by his biographer if he wanted to change his vote in any case, replied, "Yes, McCleskey v. Kemp."

== Background ==
In October 1978, Warren McCleskey (March 17, 1945 – September 25, 1991) was convicted of two counts of armed robbery and one count of murder in the Superior Court of Fulton County, Georgia. McCleskey was African American, and his victim was white Atlanta Police Officer Frank Schlatt, who was shot and killed on May 13, 1978, while trying to stop McCleskey and three other men, Bernard Depree, David Burney Jr., and Ben Wright, from robbing a furniture store. The employees had all been rounded in the back and tied up. Wright agreed to plead guilty and testify against his accomplices. In exchange, he was not prosecuted for murder and received a 20-year sentence for armed robbery. Depree and Burney Jr. were tried jointly for murder and two counts of armed robbery, found guilty, and both sentenced to life in prison.

Prosecutors sought a death sentence for McCleskey, who was believed to have been the triggerman. Immediately after they were arrested, both Depree and Burney, who were not offered plea agreements and did not testify at the trial of McCleskey, had told the police that McCleskey was the triggerman.

Tried alone, McCleskey proclaimed his innocence, but was found guilty on all counts. At his sentencing hearing, the jury found that two aggravating factors had been proven beyond a reasonable doubt: the murder was committed during the course of an armed robbery and had been committed upon a police officer engaged in the performance of his duties. The prosecution also introduced McCleskey's prior criminal history. In 1970, McCleskey was charged with 25 to 30 counts of armed robbery. He was convicted on three counts and received three life sentences. In 1971, McCleskey was resentenced to 18 years in prison. He was paroled in 1977. The prosecution claimed that McCleskey had three prior convictions of armed robbery, albeit this had been incorrect. He actually had eight prior convictions, as he had pleaded guilty to five other counts of armed robbery after his 1970 convictions.

The prosecution also presented evidence implicating McCleskey in two other armed robberies.

In his defense, McCleskey admitted to his role in the robbery, but denied being the triggerman. However, Wright testified that McCleskey had admitted to shooting the officer, while a jailhouse informant testified that McCleskey had bragged about killing Schlatt. Furthermore, Schlatt had been killed with a bullet fired from a .38 caliber Rossi revolver. The murder weapon was never recovered, but McCleskey had stolen such a gun during a previous robbery. The jury recommended a death sentence. The court followed the jury's recommendation and sentenced petitioner to death.

On appeal to the federal courts via a habeas petition, petitioner alleged the state's capital sentencing process was administered in a racially discriminatory manner in violation of the Fourteenth Amendment. Petitioner based his claims on a study, conducted by jurists David C. Baldus and Charles Pulaski, and statistician George Woodworth (the “Baldus study”), that indicated a risk that racial consideration entered into capital sentencing determinations.

Baldus, a law professor at the University of Iowa College of Law, studied 2500 murder cases in Georgia. Baldus' study concluded that all individuals convicted of murdering whites were far more likely to receive the death penalty, thus establishing that the application of the death penalty in Georgia was linked with the race of the victim. One of his models concluded that even after taking account of 39 nonracial variables, defendants charged with killing white victims were 4.3 times as likely to receive a death sentence than defendants charged with killing black victims.

== Opinion of the Court ==
The Court, in an opinion by Justice Lewis Powell, held that the statistical study did not present substantial evidence that would require a reversal of petitioner's conviction. The Court concluded that the lower court had properly applied Georgia law.

The decision said that even if Baldus' statistical data were accepted at face value, the defense failed to show evidence of conscious, deliberate bias by law officials associated with the case, and it dismissed evidence of general disparities in sentencing, such as the Baldus study, as "an inevitable part of our criminal justice system." A major point in dispute in reaching the majority's decision was the proposition that the 2,500 cases studied, like other cases in general, did not share common personnel or officials but each case involved a different set of jurors, frequently different judges, and different prosecutors. Thus no common mechanism was either identified or likely to explain a racially disparate impact. Without a plausible basis for inferring that a racially disparate effect was circumstantial evidence of a racially biased cause (even if a hidden cause), the Supreme Court majority did not find racial bias or discrimination. The majority sought to distinguish between a disparate effect as evidence of a discriminatory system from a disparate effect without a discriminatory cause. Thus, the Supreme Court left open the possibility that if a racially biased influence were identified the result might be different. Without more, the majority viewed each of the 2,500 cases in the study as a separate event without any discernible linkage between them.

== Dissenting opinions ==
Three dissenting opinions were filed by Justices Brennan, Blackmun, and Stevens. The dissenters largely agreed with and crossjoined one another's dissents, and Justice Marshall joined two of the dissents.

Brennan's lengthy dissent noted at the outset the belief he shared with Justice Marshall that "the death penalty is in all circumstances cruel and unusual punishment forbidden by the Eighth and Fourteenth Amendments." Brennan further contended that even if capital punishment were constitutional, it could hardly be so where it was demonstrably biased against members of a particular race.

Blackmun's dissent largely echoed Brennan's concerns regarding the evidence of racial bias in capital cases.

Stevens did not go so far as to suggest that the death penalty was inherently inappropriate under these circumstances but stated that the case should have been remanded to the Court of Appeals for a determination of the validity of the Baldus study.

== Impact ==
McCleskey v. Kemp has bearing on claims broader than those involving the death penalty. McCleskey has been used to illustrate that claims based on government denial of "equal protection of the laws" to racial minorities may fail unless something more than discriminatory effect can be shown. The Supreme Court generally requires, in addition to discriminatory effect, for a discriminatory purpose to be shown as the government's motivation for creating the law in the first place (See: Washington v. Davis, and Personnel Administrator of Massachusetts v. Feeney, for further clarification of this concept). Overall, McCleskey may be seen to clarify the Supreme Court's desire to punish discriminatory acts by government rather than merely discriminatory effects. At the same time federal and state governments choosing to use executions continue to carry out their deadly work with full and undeniable knowledge that the practice is tainted by racial bias, similar the pre-Furman practices made unconstitutional in 1972.

Michelle Alexander, author of The New Jim Crow, has criticized the decision:

McClesky versus Kemp has immunized the criminal justice system from judicial scrutiny for racial bias. It has made it virtually impossible to challenge any aspect, criminal justice process, for racial bias in the absence of proof of intentional discrimination, conscious, deliberate bias ... Evidence of conscious intentional bias is almost impossible to come by in the absence of some kind of admission. But the U.S. Supreme Court has said that the courthouse doors are closed to claims of racial bias in the absence of that kind of evidence, which has really immunized the entire criminal justice system from judicial and to a large extent public scrutiny of the severe racial disparities and forms of racial discrimination that go on every day unchecked by our courts and our legal process.

Warren McCleskey was executed by electrocution on September 25, 1991. At a clemency hearing, two jurors from his case told the Georgia State Board of Pardons and Paroles that they would've voted for life in prison had they known the inmate who testified that McCleskey had pulled the trigger was an informant with an incentive to obtain leniency in his own case. Before his execution, McCleskey asked his family to not be bitter and decried capital punishment. He did not admit to being the triggerman, but apologized to Officer Schlatt's family for having been complicit in his murder.

On the other hand, some academics have argued that the impact of McCleskey v. Kemp has largely been overstated. Even though McCleskey v. Kemp seems to dismiss statistical racial disparities as doctrinally irrelevant in equal protection claims, admissions statistics have been used in judicial opinions, such as the now abrogated Grutter v. Bollinger.

== See also ==
- List of United States Supreme Court cases, volume 481
- List of United States Supreme Court cases
- Lists of United States Supreme Court cases by volume
- List of United States Supreme Court cases by the Rehnquist Court
- Live from Death Row
- Furman v. Georgia

General:

- Capital punishment in Georgia (U.S. state)
- Capital punishment in the United States
- List of people executed in Georgia (U.S. state)
- List of people executed in the United States in 1991
