= William Henry Furman =

American convicted felon (born 1942)

- Born: 1942 (age 83–84); United States
- Known for: Central figure in Furman v. Georgia
- Status: Paroled
- Convictions: Felony murder (1968), burglary (2004)
- Penalty: Death (1968), commuted to life imprisonment with the possibility of parole (1972; paroled in 1984); 20 years in prison (2004; paroled in 2016)

Details
- Victims: William Joseph Micke Jr.
- Date: August 11, 1967
- Country: United States
- Location: Savannah, Georgia
- Weapon: Firearm

William Henry Furman (born 1942) is an American who was the central figure in Furman v. Georgia (1972), the case in which the United States Supreme Court outlawed most uses of the death penalty in the United States.

== Background ==
Furman, a black man, had a sixth-grade education, and was judged "emotionally disturbed and mentally impaired."

== Crime and legal history ==
Furman was convicted of murdering William Micke during a home invasion in Savannah, Georgia on August 11, 1967, and subsequently sentenced to death on September 26, 1968, after a one-day trial.

The sentence was overturned by the Supreme Court on the basis of the Eighth and Fourteenth Amendments. The decision struck down death penalty schemes in the whole country. Four years after the landmark decision, the Supreme Court reaffirmed the constitutionality of the death penalty when it approved the statutory changes made by three states in Gregg v. Georgia (1976).

Furman was paroled in April 1984.

In 2004, Furman pleaded guilty to a 2004 burglary charge in Bibb County Superior Court, and was sentenced to 20 years in prison. He was paroled twelve years later, in April 2016.
