= David C. Baldus =

American professor of law (1935-2011)

David Christopher Baldus
- Born: June 23, 1935; Wheeling, West Virginia, U.S.
- Died: June 13, 2011 (aged 75); Iowa City, Iowa, U.S.
- Education: Dartmouth College (BA); University of Pittsburgh (MA); Yale University (LLB, LLM)
- Known for: "Baldus study"

Academic work
- Discipline: Legal studies, Sociology
- Institutions: University of Iowa

David Christopher Baldus (June 23, 1935 – June 13, 2011) was an American legal scholar. He was the Joseph B. Tye Professor of Law at the University of Iowa. He held the position from 1969 until his death in 2011. His research focused on law and social science and he conducted extensive research on the death penalty in the United States.

== Biography ==
Baldus received his Bachelor of Arts (Government Major) from Dartmouth College in 1957, his Master of Arts (Political Science) from the University of Pittsburgh in 1962. He went on to attend Yale Law School, earning a LL.B. in 1964 and a LL.M. in 1969. He practiced law in Pittsburgh from 1964–68.

He served as a Lieutenant for the Army Security Agency from 1958–59.

== Research ==
=== Equal justice and the death penalty ===
In 1983 David C. Baldus, along with Charles A. Pulaski and George Woodworth, published a study examining the presence of racial discrimination in death penalty sentencing. The study analyzed over 2000 murder cases occurring in the state of Georgia in the 1970s. The cases examined by Baldus all occurred between two United States Supreme Court cases involving Georgia: Furman v. Georgia (1972) and McCleskey v. Kemp (1987). The study looked primarily at the race of the victim in each murder case in order to evaluate the presence of racial discrimination in the sentencing process. The study also examined, to a lesser extent, the race of the defendant, in order to evaluate the presence of racial discrimination in the sentencing process. After evaluating the initial findings in the study, Baldus and his colleagues subjected their data to extensive analysis involving 230 variables that could have explained the findings on non-racial grounds. In one such analysis that subjected the data to 39 nonracial variables, Baldus found that defendants accused of killing white victims were 4.3 times more likely to receive the death penalty than defendants accused of killing black victims. This analysis also showed that black defendants were 1.1 times more likely than white defendants to receive the death penalty. Based on these findings, Baldus and his colleagues concluded that a black defendant accused of killing a white victim was more likely than any other type of defendant to receive the death penalty. These results were used by the defense in McCleskey v. Kemp to try to show that racial discrimination had played a role in the sentencing of Warren McCleskey. Two types of statistical studies were used in order to examine these murder trials: a procedural reform study and a charging and sentencing study.

=== Procedural reform study ===
The purpose of the procedural reform study was to compare the procedure with which Georgia sentenced convicted murder defendants before and after Furman v. Georgia. The study then looked for reforms in the sentencing procedure after Furman v. Georgia and assessed how reforms affected discrimination found in sentencing decisions. Baldus and his colleagues looked specifically at two aspects of the trial for the procedural reform study: whether or not the prosecutor chose to seek the death sentence after a capital murder conviction was obtained, and whether or not the jury imposed a death sentence after the trial. The procedural reform study was conducted for purely academic reasons and the researchers had no intentions of using the results in actual murder trials.

==== Results ====
The procedural reform study looked at murder trials which occurred both before and after Furman v. Georgia. Baldus's study found that in murder trials before Furman v. Georgia, the death penalty was given to black defendants 19% of the time and to white defendants 8% of the time. The death penalty was given to defendants with black victims 10% of the time and to defendants with white victims 18% of the time. From this data, the researchers concluded that the race of the victim was more influential than the race of the defendant in death penalty sentencing. It was also concluded that black defendants and defendants with white victims were given harsher punishments than other defendants convicted of the same crimes.

In murder trials occurring after Furman v. Georgia, Baldus and his fellow researchers found that the death penalty was given to 22% of white defendants and to 16% of black defendants. In trials where the victim was white the death penalty was given out 27% of the time and in trials where the victim was black the death penalty was given out 7% of the time.

=== Charging and sentencing study ===
The charging and sentencing study placed its emphasis on the amount of influence that racial and other illegitimate case characteristics had on the progress of cases from the point of indictment up to the death penalty sentencing decision. The charging and sentencing study was conducted by request from the NAACP which funded the study and which hoped to use the results from the study to challenge the death-penalty system in Georgia.

==== Results ====
The results of the charging and sentencing study were the basis of Warren McCleskey's appeal (McCleskey v. Kemp) that the death penalty sentencing in his trial was influenced by racial discrimination. Baldus and his colleagues found in the charging and sentencing study that of the 2,484 cases studied, 128 defendants were given a sentence of the death penalty, meaning that 5% of all studied defendants were sentenced to death. The researchers also found that in cases where the victim was white, the death sentences was handed out at a rate 8.3 times higher than in cases where the victim was black. Finally, the study concluded that in cases with white victims and black defendant the death penalty was given out 21% of the time while in cases where both the victim and defendant were white the death penalty was given 8% of the time.
