= Live from Death Row =

Book by Mumia Abu-Jamal

- Author: Mumia Abu-Jamal
- Language: English
- Genre: Memoir
- Publication date: May 1995
- Publication place: United States
- Media type: Print

Live from Death Row, published in May 1995, is a memoir by Mumia Abu-Jamal, an American journalist and activist from Philadelphia, Pennsylvania. He is known for having been convicted of the 1981 murder of 25 year old Philadelphia Police Officer Daniel Faulkner, being sentenced to death in 1982, in a trial that Amnesty International suspected of lacking impartiality, although Amnesty International takes no stance on Abu-Jamal’s guilt or innocence in the case of the murder. Abu-Jamal wrote this book while on death row. He has always maintained his innocence of "the charges" that he was "tried and convicted of," but has never denied shooting Officer Faulkner. Publishers Addison-Wesley paid Abu-Jamal a $30,000 advance for the book.

Reports that Abu-Jamal would be paid for the book resulted in protests. In a case decided in Federal appeals court, it ruled that he had the right to be paid for commentary and writings. This is the first of several books that he has published which were completed in prison. His sentence was commuted to life in prison without parole in 2011, after he had been held for 29 years on death row.

== Context ==
Abu-Jamal explores many important historical events of relevance to the standing of black people in America. Using numerous references to law and court cases, he argues that the Dred Scott ruling is still relevant to racial relations. He asserts that black people are still far from free, denoting Nelson Mandela's plight. He expresses a dislike for William Rehnquist's conservative slant and Sandra Day O'Connor's "Rehnquistian" dissent in Penry v. Lynaugh, allowing the execution of the intellectually disabled. He mocks Lewis Powell's dismissal of statistical evidence of racial discrimination in capital sentencing in McCleskey v. Kemp and his dissent in which he states "McCleskey's claim, taken to its logical conclusion, throws into serious question the principles that underlie our entire criminal justice system". He also mentions Harry Blackmun's vote in Gregg v. Georgia, which ruled the death penalty to be constitutional. Abu-Jamal notes that Blackmun changed his mind; in Callins v. Collins the justice stated, "from this day forward, I no longer shall tinker with the machinery of death ... I feel morally and intellectually obligated simply to concede that the death penalty experiment has failed".

A former Black Panther, Abu-Jamal recalls some of his past experiences with the organization; his one-time role as bodyguard for Huey P. Newton, whom he regards as a hero; the feuding between the Newton-led West Coast members and the Eldridge Cleaver-led East Coast and, ultimately, its decline. He recounts his protest of a George Wallace rally with three other black teens, their subsequent beatings at the hands of white attendees, and his appeal for help to a police officer. The man kicked him in the face while he was on the ground.

Abu-Jamal frequently refers to the MOVE organization, its founder John Africa, and the massacre of 11 people (5 of them children) in a bombing attack on May 13, 1985, and fire caused by the Philadelphia Police Department. He compares this to the Waco siege, which resulted in 82 deaths. He also explores the 1992 trial of Los Angeles officers for the beating of Rodney King, and riots in the city after the officers were acquitted. He said that he believed each of the indicted officers had their constitutional right of double jeopardy violated by being twice put on trial for the same offense.

== Synopsis ==
Abu-Jamal structures the book as anecdotes, most exploring the prison system. In an end section titled "Musings, memories, and prophecies", he discusses past events in his life, and he commemorates some prominent black people in America.

He delves into the purported purpose of prison, suggesting that "corrections" and deterrence are no longer its true goals: he notes that there are barriers to educating inmates and that psychological problems are caused by the practices of putting prisoners in isolation and prohibiting contact during visits. He suggests that prisons are operated in order to "erode one's humanity". He describes the procedures of death row blocs, where twenty-plus-hour solitary confinement is offset by a few hours of recreation and exercise "outside" on penned-in plots of land and limited conversations with other inmates. These often relate to their attempts at appeal and their battles with the law. He details two suicides of fellow inmates, one by hanging and one by self-inflicted burns. He notes that inmates were given drugs to make them more sedated, although this endangered one man with epilepsy. He reports the interactions between "urban" prisoners and "rural" guards, and says that prisoners are subject to brutal beatings, cavity searches, racial harassment, and human rights violations after insurgencies.

In addition to prison conditions, he discusses social issues and their relevance to prison. He expresses dismay toward laws requiring mandatory sentencing, for instance those related to "three strikes"; and criticizes politicians using "tough on crime" slogans to gain support for election. He notes that the United States has the highest number of incarcerated individuals in the world. He hints at racial discrimination, as proposed in the McCleskey v. Kemp case. He cites statistics showing that the population on death row in the United States is disproportionately black and Hispanic. He explores elements of the judicial system that reveal it is affected by racism: he notes jury selection by prosecutors that is biased toward persons, often white, who approve the death penalty. In addition, he suggests that expert witnesses for the prosecution suppress or distort evidence to suit the criminal justice system. He also explores the topic of uneven justice, giving examples of police officers acquitted of murder of suspects despite compelling evidence against them. Similarly, he notes that guards frequently receive little if any punishment for inappropriate actions against prisoners.

== Publication ==
Abu-Jamal had started providing commentaries to Prison Radio and other outlets. Addison-Wesley paid Abu-Jamal a $30,000 advance for the book.

== Reception ==
The notoriety of Abu-Jamal for his case and protests related to his book deal resulted in considerable coverage of this book at publication.
