= Furman v. Georgia =

1972 U.S. Supreme Court case

- Supreme Court of the United States

Argued January 17, 1972 Decided June 29, 1972
- Full case name: William Henry Furman v. State of Georgia
- Citations: 408 U.S. 238 (more) 92 S. Ct. 2726; 33 L. Ed. 2d 346; 1972 U.S. LEXIS 169

Case history
- Prior: Cert. granted, 403 U.S. 952.
- Subsequent: Rehearing denied, 409 U.S. 902.

Holding
- The arbitrary and inconsistent imposition of the death penalty violates the Eighth and Fourteenth Amendments, and constitutes cruel and unusual punishment.

Court membership
- Chief Justice Warren E. Burger Associate Justices William O. Douglas · William J. Brennan Jr. Potter Stewart · Byron White; Thurgood Marshall · Harry Blackmun; Lewis F. Powell Jr. · William Rehnquist

Case opinions
- Per curiam
- Concurrence: Douglas
- Concurrence: Brennan
- Concurrence: Stewart
- Concurrence: White
- Concurrence: Marshall
- Dissent: Burger, joined by Blackmun, Powell, Rehnquist
- Dissent: Blackmun
- Dissent: Powell, joined by Burger, Blackmun, Rehnquist
- Dissent: Rehnquist, joined by Burger, Blackmun, Powell

Laws applied
- U.S. Const. amends. VIII, XIV
- Abrogated by
- Gregg v. Georgia (1976)

Furman v. Georgia, 408 U.S. 238 (1972), was a landmark criminal case in which the United States Supreme Court decided that arbitrary and inconsistent imposition of the death penalty violates the Eighth and Fourteenth Amendments, and constitutes cruel and unusual punishment. It was a per curiam decision. Five justices each wrote separately in support of the decision. Although the justices did not rule that the death penalty itself was unconstitutional, the Furman decision invalidated the death sentences of nearly 700 people. The decision mandated a degree of consistency in the application of the death penalty. This case resulted in a de facto moratorium of capital punishment throughout the United States. Dozens of states rewrote their death penalty laws, most of which were upheld in the 1976 case Gregg v. Georgia.

The Supreme Court consolidated the cases Jackson v. Georgia and Branch v. Texas with the Furman decision, thereby invalidating the death penalty for rape; this ruling was confirmed post-Gregg in Coker v. Georgia (1977). The court had also intended to include the case of Aikens v. California, but between the time Aikens had been heard in oral argument and a decision was to be issued, the Supreme Court of California decided in California v. Anderson that the death penalty violated the state constitution; Aikens was therefore dismissed as moot, since this decision reduced all death sentences in California to life imprisonment.

== Background ==
There were over 600 inmates on death row when Furman was decided. At the time, most states did not allow juries to consider mitigating and aggravating evidence during a separate sentencing phase of a capital trial, as they generally have since.

In McGautha v. California (1971), decided 13 months before Furman, the Supreme Court held that jurors could exercise broad discretion in capital sentencing without jury instructions guiding how that discretion should be exercised. This raised concerns that similar cases could result in different sentences and that factors such as race and financial resources could influence who received the death penalty.

== Case history ==
William Henry Furman, Lucious Jackson and Elmer Branch were three petitioners sentenced to death for aggravated felonies. Furman was convicted of murder and sentenced to death. Jackson and Branch were convicted of rape (the victims were white, and in Branch's case 65 years old).

The case of Earnest James Aikens was dropped from the Furman case because the California Supreme Court decided in People v. Anderson that the death penalty was unconstitutional under the state constitution. Because the California Supreme Court knew that Aikens and the other cases were pending at the United States Supreme Court, the U.S. Attorney General filed a petition for certiorari claiming that California had attempted to evade Supreme Court jurisdiction by applying an identical provision in the state constitution. The petition was denied and Aikens was remanded to state court.

== Supreme Court decision ==
The court's one-paragraph per curiam opinion held that "the imposition of the death penalty...in these cases constitute cruel and unusual punishment in violation of the Eighth and Fourteenth Amendments."

A majority of justices agreed that arbitrariness in capital sentencing violated the Eighth Amendment. However, the justices could not agree as to a rationale. There was not any signed opinion of the court or any plurality opinion as none of the five justices in the majority joined the opinion of any other. It was the longest set of opinions the court had ever written, over 233 pages.

=== Per curiam opinion ===
Furman ruled that the death penalty was unconstitutional when applied arbitrarily in a manner that leads to discriminatory results. The median justices Potter Stewart and Byron White were concerned that erratic and arbitrary imposition of the death penalty violated the constitutional prohibition against cruel and unusual punishment. Justice White said the death penalty was imposed so infrequently that the penological justification of deterrence was weakened and there was "no meaningful basis for distinguishing the few cases in which it is imposed from the many cases in which it is not". Deterrence was not the only penological justification discussed in the opinions. Justice Stewart said retributive punishment was a constitutionally permissible "ingredient" of punishment (a view subsequently supported by only four Justices in the Gregg plurality opinion):

I cannot agree that retribution is a constitutionally impermissible ingredient in the imposition of punishment...When people begin to believe that organized society is unwilling or unable to impose upon criminal offenders the punishment they "deserve", then there are sown the seeds of anarchy—of self-help, vigilante justice and lynch law.

Justice Stewart was concerned the death penalty was being applied "capriciously". In one of the most famous quotes from the case Justice Stewart said "These death sentences are cruel and unusual in the same way that being struck by lightning is cruel and unusual." If there was any identifiable basis for why the death penalty was imposed in these cases, it was "the constitutionally impermissible basis of race". Three justices raised concerns about racial bias. Justice Douglas said:

It would seem to be incontestible that the death penalty inflicted on one defendant is 'unusual' if it discriminates against him by reason of his race, religion, wealth, social position, or class, or if it is imposed under such a procedure that gives room for the play of such prejudices.

Justices William J. Brennan and Thurgood Marshall concluded that the death penalty was in itself "cruel and unusual punishment" because it was excessive, served no valid legislative purpose and was incompatible with the evolving standards of decency of a contemporary society.

In his concurrence Justice Brennan said jury-imposed death sentences were relatively few, compared to number of death penalty eligible cases, indicating that sentencing outcomes were arbitrary without meaningful narrowing of eligibility: "it is highly implausible that only the worst criminals or the criminals who commit the worst crime are selected for this punishment".

Justice Marshall said Americans "know almost nothing about capital punishment" and would not "knowingly support purposeless vengeance". Marshall rejected the deterrence justification by concluding "the death penalty is no more effective a deterrent than life imprisonment." Marshall commented further on the possibility of wrongful execution, writing:

No matter how careful courts are, the possibility of perjured testimony, mistaken honest testimony and human error remain too real. We have no way of judging how many innocent persons have been executed, but we can be certain that there were some.

== Dissents ==
Chief Justice Warren Burger and Justices Harry Blackmun, Lewis F. Powell, and William H. Rehnquist, each appointed by President Richard Nixon, dissented.

They argued that determining the changing standards of decency and public opinion was a legislative function:

The widely divergent views of the Amendment expressed in today's opinions reveal the haze that surrounds this constitutional command. Yet it is essential to our role as a court that we not seize upon the enigmatic character of the guarantee as an invitation to enact our personal predilections into law.

Blackmun and Burger also stated that they personally opposed the death penalty, and would vote against it, or "restrict it to a small category of the most heinous crimes", but that it was constitutional.

== Subsequent developments ==
Executions dropped after the decision and rose again following Gregg v. Georgia (1976).

The Supreme Court's decision marked the first time the Justices vacated a death sentence under the Eighth Amendment Cruel and Unusual Punishment Clause, resulting in over 630 death sentences being vacated and reduced to life imprisonment. Many thought the decision heralded the end of capital punishment in the United States. The next day, columnist Barry Schweid wrote that it was "unlikely" that the death penalty could exist anymore in the United States but there was a backlash and public support for the death penalty increased dramatically after the Furman decision. According to Stephen F. Smith the increase of public support for the death penalty was driven by the "politicization of the death penalty". He says "the number of executions might well have continued to decline but for the Court's effort, in the early 1970s, to impose constitutional limits on capital punishment".

During the next four years, 35 states and the federal government enacted death penalty statutes intended to overcome the court's concerns about the arbitrary imposition of the death penalty.

Many of the new statutes that mandated bifurcated trials with separate guilt-innocence and sentencing phases, and imposed standards guiding juries and judges during the penalty phase, were upheld in a series of Supreme Court decisions in 1976, beginning with Gregg v. Georgia where the court said that "a carefully drafted statute that ensures that the sentencing authority is given adequate information and guidance" would meet the constitutional standard of Furman. Other statutes enacted in response to Furman, such as Louisiana's, which mandated imposition of the death penalty upon conviction of certain crimes, were invalidated for cases of that same year.

== See also ==
- Capital punishment in the United States
- List of United States Supreme Court cases, volume 408
- Coker v. Georgia
- Kennedy v. Louisiana
- Gregg v. Georgia
- Baze v. Rees
- Glossip v. Gross
