= Capital punishment in Puerto Rico =

Capital punishment in Puerto Rico, an unincorporated territory of the United States, is abolished. However, a number of people were executed in the territory before abolition. A person who commits a federal crime in Puerto Rico can receive the death penalty.

== History ==
From the 16th century until 1898, Puerto Rico was a part of the Spanish Empire. The number of people executed in Puerto Rico by the Spanish authorities is: 289 in the 16th century, 70 in the 17th century, 44 in the 18th century and 144 in the 19th century.

As a result of the Spanish–American War, Puerto Rico became U.S. territory. 27 people were executed under American administration during the 20th century. The authorized method of execution was hanging, although in 1900, the American military authorities executed at least five convicted murderers using the garrotte method that was a legacy of Spanish rule.

Two men, Arocho y Clemente (Carlos Arocho Guzmán and Jacinto Clemente Echevarría) were sentenced for the rape and murder of a 13-year-old girl. At the time, it was one of the worst crimes in the annals of Puerto Rico crime history. The death penalty sentence on Arocho was appealed and made its way to the U.S. Supreme Court, only to be upheld. They were both hanged on June 27, 1927.

The last person executed in Puerto Rico was Pascual Ramos, hanged for murder in 1927. Two years later, in 1929, the Legislative Assembly of Puerto Rico abolished capital punishment. The Puerto Rico's constitution expressly states that "The death penalty shall not exist."

Despite these provisions, the death penalty can and has been sought for federal crimes committed in Puerto Rico. This has been done under the federal government jurisdiction, for people tried and convicted in federal court.

== See also ==
- Capital punishment in the United States
