= Conservatives Concerned About the Death Penalty =

Anti-death penalty organization in the United States

Conservatives Concerned
- Established: March 12, 2013
- Location: United States
- Website: conservativesconcerned.org
- Formerly called: Conservatives Concerned About the Death Penalty

Conservatives Concerned, formerly Conservatives Concerned About the Death Penalty, is a USA-based national network of conservative Republicans and Libertarians calling for a re-examination of the American system of capital punishment.

== Organization ==
Conservatives Concerned engages in advocacy, education, and outreach to conservative, Republican, and Libertarian leaders and organizations around capital punishment. Conservatives Concerned provides a national forum for conservatives on both sides of the issue to express their concerns about the death penalty.

The organization cites several reason for conservative opposition to the death penalty, including the high cost of capital punishment compared to life imprisonment without the possibility of parole, the risk of wrongful execution, the negative impact on victims families, the lack of deterrence, and a contradiction to pro-life values.

== Activities ==
Conservatives Concerned's programs include educating conservatives about the death penalty system and mobilizing them to bring about its end through legislative advocacy, resource development, case work, awareness campaigns, and more.

The organization has partnered with conservative, Republican, Libertarian, and faith-based leaders and organizations across the country and spoken at national meetings of the Republican Liberty Caucus, the Young Republican National Federation, Young Americans for Liberty, the Liberty Political Action Conference, State Policy Network, CPAC St. Louis, CPAC, and the Faith and Freedom Coalition’s Road to Majority conference.

While Conservatives Concerned works nationwide, the organization currently has dedicated state affiliates in Texas, Oklahoma, Tennessee, and Georgia.

== History ==
Conservatives Concerned traces its roots to Montana in 2009, when conservative lawmakers and Republican party officials came together to call for an end to the death penalty, citing exorbitant costs. As interest grew in Montana and beyond, the movement formally launched as Conservatives Concerned About the Death Penalty at the Conservative Political Action Conference (CPAC) in 2013. At the time, the national organization was represented by founders, members, and staff from Montana, Texas, Kentucky, Michigan, and Georgia.

Since its founding in 2013, Conservatives Concerned has helped end the death penalty in New Hampshire, Colorado, and Virginia, and Republican lawmakers have sponsored death penalty repeal or reform legislation in states like Ohio, Wyoming, Pennsylvania, Texas, Oklahoma, and Utah. They have participated in efforts to repeal the death penalty in Nebraska, Florida, Wyoming, Louisiana, Ohio, and more.

On October 28, 2019, Conservatives Concerned released a Conservative Statement of Support to End the Death Penalty signed by more than 250 prominent conservatives from 44 states.

In 2023, Conservatives Concerned was included in letters from hundreds of organizations calling for President Biden to commute federal death row.

The organization changed its name to Conservatives Concerned in 2024, dropping "About the Death Penalty." Until 2025, Conservatives Concerned was a project of Equal Justice USA, a non-profit organization working on criminal justice issues.

Over the past several years, Conservatives Concerned launched several state chapters that remain active today. Tennessee Conservatives Concerned launched in 2015, followed by Oklahoma Conservatives Concerned in 2022, Texas Conservatives Concerned in 2023, and Georgia Conservatives Concerned in 2026.
