= Hill v. McDonough =

- Supreme Court of the United States

Argued April 26, 2006 Decided June 12, 2006
- Full case name: Clarence E. Hill, Petitioner v. James R. McDonough, Interim Secretary, Florida Department of Corrections, et al.
- Docket no.: 05-8794
- Citations: 547 U.S. 573 (more) 126 S. Ct. 2096; 165 L. Ed. 2d 44; 2006 U.S. LEXIS 4674; 74 U.S.L.W. 4307; 19 Fla. L. Weekly Fed. S 242

Case history
- Prior: Petition dismissed, M.D. Fla., Jan. 21, 2006; affirmed, 437 F.3d 1084 (11th Cir. 2006); cert. granted, 546 U.S. 1158 (2006).

Holding
- Because a death row prisoner's Eighth Amendment challenge to the method of execution was not a habeas corpus petition, but instead stated a claim under 42 U.S.C. §1983, his claim could not be barred by his previously filed petition for habeas relief. Eleventh Circuit Court of Appeals reversed and remanded.

Court membership
- Chief Justice John Roberts Associate Justices John P. Stevens · Antonin Scalia; Anthony Kennedy · David Souter; Clarence Thomas · Ruth Bader Ginsburg; Stephen Breyer · Samuel Alito

Case opinion
- Majority: Kennedy, joined by unanimous

Laws applied
- U.S. Const. amend. VIII; U.S. Const. amend. XIV; 28 U.S.C. § 2244; 42 U.S.C. § 1983

Hill v. McDonough, 547 U.S. 573 (2006), was a United States Supreme Court case challenging the use of lethal injection as a form of execution in the state of Florida. The Court ruled unanimously that an Eighth Amendment challenge to the method of execution properly raised a claim under 42 U.S.C. § 1983, which provides a cause of action for civil rights violations, rather than under the habeas corpus provisions. Accordingly, a previously filed petition for habeas corpus relief could not bar the present challenge.

== Factual background ==
In 1983, Clarence E. Hill was convicted of the murder of a Pensacola, Florida police officer, and subsequently sentenced to death in 1985, in the Florida Supreme Court case of Hill v. State. At a resentencing hearing in 1986, Hill's death sentence was reinstated, this time being upheld by the Florida Supreme Court. In November 1989, a warrant for Hill's execution was signed by then Governor Robert Martinez, after which Hill sought postconviction relief in both the Florida state courts and the U.S. District Court. In 1992, Hill's relief was granted when it was ruled that the Florida Supreme Court as well as Hill's trial court had not properly reevaluated the aggravating factors warranting a death sentence when one of them was vacated. In Hill v. State, the Florida Supreme Court, having sufficiently reweighed the mitigating factors, resentenced Hill to death. Hill then sought federal habeas corpus relief, which was first denied by the U.S. District Court, then affirmed by the Eleventh Circuit Court of Appeals.

=== Lethal injection in Florida ===
In January 2000, the Florida legislature amended its state statutes changing the prescribed method of execution from electrocution to lethal injection, unless the person sentenced to death affirmatively elects to be executed by electrocution. The precise authority by which lethal injection was to be carried out was left to the Florida Department of Corrections.

The Florida Department of Corrections does not publish its information about lethal injection, and so the only source available describing Florida's use of the lethal injection death penalty comes from Sims v. State, which indicated that the lethal injection death penalty was carried out by first administering sodium thiopental, an anesthetic, then pancuronium bromide, which paralyzes the lungs, and followed lastly by potassium chloride, which inflicts cardiac arrest.

== Lower court proceedings ==
On November 29, 2005, Florida Governor Jeb Bush signed a warrant for Hill's execution, which was to be carried out on January 24, 2006. Upon the signing of his death warrant, Hill requested information from the Department of Corrections regarding the specific methods by which lethal injection were carried out. Sims v. State permitted the Florida Department of Corrections to change its procedures for carrying out the lethal injection death penalty as it saw fit, and Hill sought to find out how those procedures had changed, if at all. The Florida Department of Corrections refused to comply with Hill's request.

=== Florida state courts ===
Because the information in Sims v. State seemed to suggest the possibility of causing great bodily harm, Hill filed, on December 15, 2005, a petition for postconviction relief in the state of Florida and requested an evidentiary hearing to investigate whether or not the state's lethal injection death penalty did, in fact, cause bodily harm. The Circuit Court for Escambia County denied Hill's motions for postconviction relief and for an evidentiary hearing. Hill then appealed to the Florida Supreme Court on January 3, 2006. On January 17, 2006, Florida's High Court affirmed.

=== U.S. District Court for the Middle District of Florida ===
Three days later, on January 20, Hill filed suit in the U.S. District Court for the Middle District of Florida under 42 U.S.C. 1983, challenging that Florida's lethal injection death penalty would cause great bodily harm in violation of his Eighth and Fourteenth Amendment rights. Hill requested an injunction barring his execution until his claims could be judged upon as well as a permanent injunction barring the Department of Corrections from utilizing the lethal injection death penalty. Hill did not, however, challenge his death sentence.

The next day, the U.S. District Court denied Hill's petition, contending that standing case law was clear on the matter of jurisdiction. Under Robinson v. Crosby and In re Provenzano, the District Court held that Hill's claim was the same as a petition for habeas corpus, and, as a result, was required to be dismissed because Hill had not filed a habeas petition under 28 U.S.C. 2244(b).

=== Eleventh Circuit Court of Appeals ===
With Hill's execution approaching fast, Hill filed an emergency appeal to the Eleventh Circuit Court of Appeals, which, on the day of Hill's execution, affirmed the U.S. District Court. They agreed with the lower court that Hill's suit was, in fact, a habeas corpus petition, and the District Court was right to dismiss.

=== Certiorari granted ===
The same day, Hill petitioned the U.S. Supreme Court for certiorari and requested a stay of execution. Justice Kennedy granted a temporary stay, which was followed up the next day by a granting of certiorari from the entire Court and a full stay of execution.

== Parties and counsel ==
=== Petitioner ===
The petitioner in Hill v. McDonough is Clarence Edward Hill. In the lower courts, Hill is also the plaintiff-appellant.

=== Respondents ===
In the lower courts, the respondents in Hill v. McDonough were James V. Crosby, Jr., the Secretary of the Florida Department of Corrections, and Charlie Crist, the Attorney General of Florida. In the lower courts, both Crosby and Crist were defendants-appellants.

Since the lower court rulings, James V. Crosby, Jr. has been replaced by James R. McDonough, the interim Secretary of the Florida Department of Corrections.

Hill has amended his suit to include McDonough and exclude Crosby. Crist remains as a respondent.

=== Counsel ===
Hill's counsel of record is D. Todd Doss of Lake City, FL. Assisting him in the appeal are Donald B. Verrilli, Jr., Ian Heath Gershengorn, and Eric Berger, all of whom are from Jenner & Block LLP. John Abatecola, a private attorney from Sunrise, FL, is also assisting.

McDonough and Crist's attorney of record is Carolyn M. Snurkowski, the Assistant Deputy Attorney General of Florida. Charlie Crist is also assisting.

=== Counsel Amicus Curiae ===
Amicus Curiae for Hill are Human Rights Advocates, Human Rights Watch, and the Minnesota Advocates for Human Rights. They are represented by Constance de La Vega, Professor of Law at the University of San Francisco, whose office is at the Frank C. Newman International Human Rights Law Clinic. Assisting is David Weissbrodt, a Regents Professor as well as a Frederickson & Byron Professor of Law at the University of Minnesota.

Amicus Curiae for McDonough and Crist are the Solicitor General’s Office, the Attorney General’s Office, and the Department of Justice. They are represented by Paul D. Clement, the United States Solicitor General. Assisting him are Assistant Attorney General Alice S. Fisher, Deputy Solicitor General Gregory G. Garre, Assistant to the Solicitor General Kannon K. Shanmugam, and Department of Justice Attorney Robert J. Erickson.

== Briefs of the petitioner and respondent ==
In Hill's brief to the U.S. Supreme Court, two questions are presented:

=== Question One ===
1. Whether a complaint brought under 42 U.S.C. § 1983 by a death-sentenced state prisoner, who seeks to stay his execution in order to pursue a challenge to the chemicals utilized for carrying out the execution, is properly recharacterized as a habeas corpus petition under 28 U.S.C. § 2254.

==== Hill's brief ====
By invoking 42 U.S.C. 1983, Hill argues that the procedures for carrying out lethal injection as prescribed by the Florida Department of Corrections are intended to violate his Eighth Amendment right against cruel and unusual punishment. The Eleventh Circuit's dismissal of his petition, Hill argues, fails to adjudicate his Eighth Amendment claim, and, accordingly, requests the Eleventh Circuit's ruling be reversed.

==== Government's brief ====
The government contends that, because the end result of Hill's suit is to challenge a death sentence, the claim must be filed under the 28 U.S.C. 2254 habeas statute, under which such challenges are supposed to be filed. Accordingly, the government requests the Eleventh Circuit's ruling be affirmed.

==== Hill's rebuttal brief ====
Hill rebuts the government by saying that habeas claims under 28 U.S.C. 2254 are reserved for challenges for the death penalty as a whole, whereas challenges for the specific method of execution should be controlled by 42 U.S.C. 1983. Accordingly, Hill requests the Eleventh Circuit's ruling be reversed.

==== Question Two ====
2. Whether, under this Court’s decision in Nelson, a challenge to a particular protocol the State plans to use during the execution process constitutes a cognizable claim under 42 U.S.C. § 1983.

===== Hill's brief =====
Citing Nelson v. Campbell, Hill argues that, because his petition is only challenging the method by which the state of Florida intends to execute him, and not the death sentence itself, the Court is required to entertain his petition, and, accordingly, requests the Eleventh Circuit's ruling be reversed.

===== Government's brief =====
The government challenges Hill's reading of Nelson, contending that claims under 42 U.S.C. 1983 are only cognizable if a habeas challenge has been entertained. Accordingly, the government requests the Eleventh Circuit's ruling be affirmed.

===== Hill's rebuttal brief =====
Hill rebuts the government by saying that Nelson controls so long as a claim under 42 U.S.C. 1983 is specific to the method of the execution and not the sentence itself. Accordingly, Hill requests the Eleventh Circuit's ruling be reversed.

== The court's decision ==
The Supreme Court handed down its decision on June 12, 2006.

== See also ==
- List of United States Supreme Court cases, volume 547
- List of United States Supreme Court cases
