= Clarence Hill (murderer) =

American murderer (1957–2006)

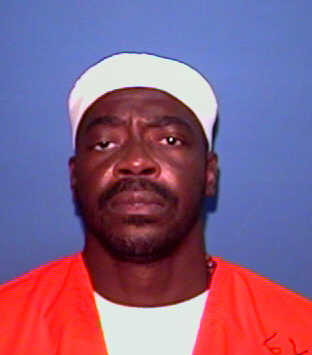
- Mug shot of Hill
- Born: December 2, 1957; Mobile, Alabama, U.S.
- Died: September 20, 2006 (aged 48); Florida State Prison, Florida, U.S.
- Status: Executed by lethal injection
- Motive: To avoid arrest
- Convictions: First degree murder Attempted first degree murder Armed robbery (3 counts)
- Penalty: Death

Clarence Edward Hill (December 2, 1957 – September 20, 2006) was an American convicted murderer executed by the state of Florida.

A native of Mobile, Alabama, Hill was convicted of the October 19, 1982, murder of Pensacola, Florida, police officer Stephen Taylor and the wounding of Taylor's partner, Larry Bailly, when both officers responded to a bank alarm. Hill was sentenced to death.

On January 24, 2006, as his execution was just moments away from commencing—Hill was strapped to a gurney with intravenous lines in his arms—it was stopped by a stay from Justice Anthony Kennedy of the United States Supreme Court. Mr. Hill's lawyer, Todd Doss, had lobbied for the stay on the grounds that the chemicals involved in lethal injection violated Mr. Hill's Eighth Amendment rights, protecting against "cruel and unusual punishment."

On June 12, 2006, Justice Anthony Kennedy authored an opinion for a unanimous court in Hill v. McDonough, which gave Hill a temporary reprieve. The Court concluded that Mr. Hill did have the right to make an Eighth Amendment claim against Florida's method of lethal injection, overturning a District Court ruling. The ruling did not declare that the chemical used in lethal injections in Florida was unconstitutional, but it allowed inmates to make the claim.

However, a district court in Tallahassee and an appeals court in Atlanta refused to hear Hill's challenges, ruling that he should have filed earlier. An appeal was again filed with the Supreme Court, which voted 5–4 on September 20, 2006, to deny another stay.

Later that day, 24 years after his crime, Hill was executed through lethal injection by the state of Florida at the Florida State Prison in Raiford, Florida. He did not reply when asked if he had a last statement, staring straight at the ceiling, awaiting the start of the lethal injection.

== See also ==
- List of people executed in Florida
- List of people executed in the United States in 2006
