= Jane Champion =

Woman executed for infanticide in 1632

- Died: 1632; Jamestown, Colony of Virginia, British America
- Cause of death: Execution by hanging
- Resting place: Body donated to medical science
- Spouse: Percival Champion
- Status: Executed
- Convictions: Murder concealing the death of a child
- Penalty: Death

Jane Champion (died 1632) was a convict who was the first woman known to be sentenced to death and executed in the territory of today's United States. Champion and her alleged illicit lover, William Gallopin, were accused of murdering and concealing the death of their child.

Jane Champion was married to a wealthy landowner named Percival. At some point in 1630, Champion is alleged to have engaged in an extramarital affair with another colonist, William Gallopin. Champion became pregnant and made lengthy attempts to hide her pregnancy. The baby was born sometime in late 1631 or early 1632 and subsequently died. Champion and Gallopin were accused of causing the death of the infant and were charged with murder and concealing the death of the child. They were tried and found guilty, and were subsequently sentenced to death, albeit there is no record of the execution of Gallopin taking place. Champion was executed by hanging in 1632, and her body was donated to science.
