= George Woodworth =

American baseball coach (1938–2022)

Biographical details
- Born: March 23, 1938; Morenci, Arizona, U.S.
- Died: March 19, 2022 (aged 83)

Playing career
- 1958–1960: Dartmouth

Coaching career (HC unless noted)
- 1964–1971: Worcester Academy
- 1971–1980: Brown

Administrative career (AD unless noted)
- 1966–1969: Worcester Academy (asst. AD)
- 1969–1971: Worcester Academy
- 1971–1983: Brown (asst. to the AD)

Head coaching record
- Overall: 108–177–2 (.380)

George Nelson "Woody" Woodworth (March 23, 1938 – March 19, 2022) was an American baseball coach who was the head coach at Brown University from 1972 to 1980.

== Early life ==
Woodworth was born March 23, 1938 in Morenci, Arizona to Carl and Barbara (Seagrave) Woodworth. He grew up in New London, Connecticut and was co-captain of New London High School's football and baseball teams during his senior year. He played catcher for the Dartmouth baseball team and was captain during the 1960 season. From 1960 to 1963, he served in the United States Marine Corps.

== Coaching ==
In 1963, Woodworth became a teacher and baseball coach at Worcester Academy. He became the assistant athletic director in 1966 and succeeded Dee Rowe as athletic director when he became head coach of the UConn Huskies men's basketball team in 1969.

In August 1971, Woodworth was appointed head coach of the Brown Bears baseball team and director of intramural sports. He was the first coach hired by athletic director Andy Geiger. Woodworth coached 1974 Major League Baseball draft first overall pick Bill Almon, who had been recruited by his predecessor, Bill Livesey. Almon described Woodworth as the "perfect fit for me". "He gave me a lot of leeway to do things within the game that I felt comfortable doing and challenged me a lot and made me very comfortable." Woodworth resigned after the 1980 season. He was unhappy with his tenure, stating that he had "neither accomplished what I attended or what I should have". He had an overall record of 108–177–2.

== Later life ==
After he left coaching, Woodworth remained at Brown as an assistant to the athletic director. In 1983, he joined the McCall Foundation, where he worked in addiction treatment and prevention programs. From 1990 to 2000, he worked for Drugs Donʼt Work, a public-private partnership that provided educational materials to schools in Connecticut. He then worked as an independent consultant in the field of substance abuse and prevention. He died on March 19, 2022.
