= Mitigating evidence =

Evidence intended to establish the presence of mitigating circumstances

Mitigating evidence is evidence that is provided (usually by the defendant in a criminal trial) in order to try to establish the presence of mitigating circumstances. The presence of mitigating circumstances can reduce the punishment imposed for the offense. The case of the Oregon v. Guzek dealt with the issue of whether alibi evidence not introduced at trial could be introduced in the sentencing phase of a death penalty trial as mitigating evidence.
