= Barry Schweid =

American journalist (1932–2015)

- Born: July 30, 1932; New York City, U.S.
- Died: December 10, 2015 (aged 83)
- Education: Stuyvesant High School; Columbia University; Columbia University Graduate School of Journalism
- Occupation: Journalist

Barry Schweid (July 30, 1932 – December 10, 2015) was an American journalist. As a correspondent for the Associated Press (AP), he reported on politics and international diplomacy from the 1950s until his retirement in 2012.

Schweid was born in Manhattan, New York City. He attended Stuyvesant High School (class of 1949), Columbia University (class of 1953), where he worked on the Columbia Daily Spectator, and the Columbia University Graduate School of Journalism (1954). After Columbia, he served in the U.S. Army as a public relations specialist before joining the Associated Press.

Among many other stories, Schweid covered the shuttle diplomacy efforts of Henry Kissinger.

Schweid retired in 2012. He died on December 10, 2015, from "complications of a degenerative neurological condition." After his death, U.S. Secretary of State John Kerry released a statement calling Schweid "an Associated Press legend and the longtime dean of the State Department press corps".
