= Bias of jurors =

Systematic influences on jury decision-making unrelated to legal evidence

Bias of jurors occurs when verdicts and sentencing recommendations by jurors are influenced by factors other than the legal evidence presented at trial. Research in psychology, criminology, and legal studies has documented several forms of juror bias, including based on the personal characteristics of the defendant or victim (such as race, ethnicity, gender, socioeconomic status or physical attractiveness), and the type of crime committed. Various cognitive biases that affect how jurors process information have also been identified. Biases have been studied using mock jury experiments and analyses of prior trial outcomes. Research of juror bias has primarily though not exclusively focused on the United States; other countries that use jury trials include the United Kingdom, Canada and Australia.

== Background ==
The first large-scale systematic study of juries is acknowledged to be Harry Kalven and Hans Zeisel's The American Jury, published in 1966. Surveying roughly 3,500 criminal trials from the 1950s, the study found that judges and juries agreed on the verdict in about 78% of cases; and that in the remaining cases, juries were considerably more likely to be more lenient than judges. Kalven and Zeisel attributed the disparity in part to juror sentiments about the defendant or the law itself, alongside different juror interpretations of reasonable doubt or evaluations of evidence.

Subsequent decades of research, as exemplified in 2001 and 2014 meta-analyses by Dennis Devine and colleagues, have confirmed that jury verdicts are shaped by an interaction of evidence strength, deliberation processes, and juror characteristics and biases. Neil Vidmar in 2002 described four categories of juror prejudices: interest prejudice (personal interest in the trial outcome), specific prejudice (preexisting beliefs about specific issues in the case), generic prejudice (preexisting beliefs about categories of people) and conformity prejudice (the influence of the reactions of others). In 2022, Lee J. Curley and colleagues described pre-trial bias, cognitive bias and bias originating from expert witnesses as main sources.

Juror bias based on demographic characteristics, such as racial or gender bias, can be based on either the characteristics of the defendant or the characteristics of the victim.

== Racial and ethnic bias ==
=== United States ===
Racial bias in United States juries has been studied extensively, with individual studies reaching varied conclusions, though evidence overall suggests that it is a factor in at least some cases. A 2005 meta-analysis by Tara Mitchell and colleagues found a small but significant overall impact of racial bias (similarity-leniency effect) in juror verdict and sentencing decisions, and that Black participants overall showed higher levels of bias than White participants. The 2014 Devine meta-analysis found a small similarity-leniency effect of White jurors relative to Latino defendants and Black jurors relative to White defendants, but not for White jurors relative to Black defendants. In 2020, Amanda Bergold and Margaret Bull Kovera wrote that evidence for juror bias against minority defendants was consistent in archival analysis of trials but less so in mock juror studies. A 2023 study of grand jury decisions by Mark Hoekstra and colleagues found a small disparate impact on Black defendants, but that this did not result from taste-based or statistical racial discrimination, based on data from a quarter million felony cases.

A 2015 review by Jennifer S. Hunt observed jurors overall tended to show a similarity-leniency effect in non-capital cases, while in capital cases the race of the victim was more determinative; specifically, jurors were more likely to recommend the death penalty in cases where Black or Latino defendants killed White victims. One notable study by 1983 David C. Baldus and colleagues analyzing over 2,000 1970s murder cases in the state of Georgia found that accounting for 39 nonracial variables, defendants accused of killing White victims were 4.3 times more likely to receive the death penalty than defendants accused of killing Black victims, though Black defendants were only 1.1 times more likely than White defendants to receive the death penalty. The study was analyzed by the Supreme Court in the 1987 McCleskey v. Kemp case.

==== Causes ====
Several studies have found that White jurors are more likely to make similar judgements about White and Black defendants in cases where race is salient, but are more likely to convict Black defendants in other cases; suggesting White jurors' motivation to appear nonprejudiced when racial issues are salient may be a mitigating factor. For example, in one 2000 study by Samuel Sommers and Phoebe Ellsworth, White non-college student mock jurors were only influenced by race in cases where racial issues were not salient, in which they rated Black defendants more negatively. Black non-student jurors by contrast demonstrated same-race leniency toward Black defendants in both scenarios.

In a 2006 study with a Black defendant, Sommers found that jurors on racially diverse mock juries deliberated longer, considered a wider range of perspectives, made fewer factual errors, and were more receptive to discussions of race than those on all-White juries; and that White individuals on diverse juries were more lenient even before deliberation had begun.

Bergold and Kovera cited social identity theory, stereotypic associations and aversive racism as potential explanations for juror bias. Some studies have found that racial bias of jurors is increased if a crime is stereotypically associated with the defendant's racial group.

=== United Kingdom ===
A 2007 United Kingdom Ministry of Justice study by Cheryl Thomas and Nigel Balmer found significant same-race leniency among black and minority ethnic (BME) jurors. BME jurors voted guilty against white defendants 73% of the time versus 24% of the time against BME defendants, compared to 39% and 32% respectively for White jurors. The disparity was significantly mitigated in racially salient cases.

== Gender bias ==
A 1994 meta-analysis by Ronald Mazzella and Alan Feingold found a small but significant juror bias against male defendants compared to female defendants, although for some crimes there was no gender advantage for women. They also observed that jurors were harsher toward defendants if their victim was female. By contrast, Devine in 2014 found the overall impact of the defendant's gender on mock jurors to be close to zero. Studies focusing on sexual assault crimes have predominately found a relative leniency toward female defendants.

== Socioeconomic bias ==
Mazzella and Feingold's meta-analysis in 1994 observed low socioeconomic status to be a detrimental trait for some criminal defendants. Bettina Spencer observed in 2016 how socioeconomic status directly correlated to jurors’ opinions about defendants and their believability. In rape cases where female witnesses were in a lower socioeconomic class, jurors assigned more blame to the witness than the defendant despite lack of tangible evidence.

== Physical attractiveness bias ==
Several studies, both of mock jurors and real cases, have concluded that defendants judged more physically attractive are more likely to receive more lenient outcomes from jurors. A 1974 study by Michael Efran found that more attractive defendants were rated as less guilty and recommended for less severe punishment by mock jurors than unattractive defendants presented with identical evidence. The Mazzella and Feingold 1994 meta-analysis found an overall leniency effect for attractive defendants, although the impact was relatively small. Attractive individuals have been consistently shown in studies to be more often perceived by others as having positive qualities, such as trustworthiness and mental stability.

By contrast, there is also evidence suggesting jurors can perceive an attractive defendant more negatively in certain cases. In 1975, Harold Sigall and Nancy Ostrove found that for crimes unrelated to attractiveness (e.g. burglary), attractive defendants were treated more leniently by mock jurors, but for crimes in which attractiveness was instrumental to the offense (e.g. swindling) attractive defendants were punished more severely. Studies have also consistently shown that juror leniency toward attractive defendants is mitigated or even reversed as the crime's severity increases. Some scholars have interpreted this as a "reverse attribution bias", or an overcorrection based on an incorrect initial positive perception of attractiveness.

== Crime-type bias ==
Crime-type bias is when a juror perceives the strength of the prosecutor's case differently based on the type or severity of the crime. Several studies have indicated the presence of crime-type bias based on severity, for example, a 2018 study by John M. Pearson and colleagues. There is some evidence to suggest that female jurors are harsher than male jurors particularly in cases of child abuse, sexual assault or domestic abuse. A 1997 Neil Vidmar study of sexual abuse trials in Canada found that 36% of prospective jurors on average stated they could not be impartial.

=== Jury nullification ===
Jury nullification allows jurors to acquit a defendant despite believing the defendant had broken the law. Irwin Horowitz's 1985 experiment found that mock juries given explicit instructions about jury nullification were less likely to vote guilty in a euthanasia case but more likely in a drunk driving case. Jurors who received nullification instructions also spent relatively less time discussing the evidence and more time discussing the defendant's own characteristics. A follow-up study by Kara Niedermeier, Horowitz, and Norbert Kerr in 1999 found that informing jurors of their nullification power increased the chances of jurors nullifying "when the strict application of the law would result in an unjust verdict".

== Cognitive biases ==
Jurors have been documented to be subject to various cognitive biases, or biases resulting from an individual's construction of reality.

=== Media consumption ===
Research has consistently shown that exposure to pretrial publicity has the potential to influence juror perception of defendants and verdicts. Christina Studebaker and colleagues in 2002 noted some disagreement on the applicability of this research to real trials. A 2002 Margaret Bull Kovera study found that media consumption impacted standards used by mock jurors to determine guilt; for example, those who watched a pro-defense rape story were more likely to report the need for additional inculpatory evidence than those who watched a pro-prosecution rape story.

==== CSI effect ====
The so-called "CSI effect," the claim that jurors exposed to televised forensic dramas develop unrealistic expectations for scientific evidence and are less likely to convict without it, has been widely discussed. While some research has identified a possible pro-defense bias, other research has found no empirical evidence, or that while forensic drama viewers viewed evidence differently, it did not lead to a detrimental effect.

=== Anchoring bias ===
A 1996 experiment by Gretchen Chapman and Brian Bornstein found that mock jurors' damage awards were systematically influenced by the amount a plaintiff's attorney requested, indicating an anchoring bias in jury decision-making.

=== Hindsight bias ===
In a 1995 study, Kim Kamin and Jeffrey Rachlinski found that mock jurors evaluating a defendant's precautions against a foreseeable harm judged the same precautions as unreasonably inadequate when told the harm had actually occurred, compared to when they were asked to judge the precautions prospectively, suggesting the presence of hindsight bias.

=== Narrative construction ===
An 1986 study by Nancy Pennington and Reid Hastie found that jurors represented evidence as an overarching narrative or "story", and that jurors' cognitive representation correlated with their verdicts.

=== Group deliberation ===
Research has generally suggested that juror biases can be amplified during the juror deliberation process or at least are not mitigated, although at least one study found that deliberation can dampen juror's reliance on inadmissible evidence.

In a 2000 study on the specific context of punitive damages awards, David Schkade, Cass Sunstein, and Daniel Kahneman found that jury deliberation produced a "severity shift," whereby deliberating juries tended to arrive at higher punitive damage awards than the median of the individual awards jurors favored before deliberating. A 2017 study by Christine Ruva and Christina Guenther found that pretrial publicity bias can spread between jurors, and that jurors having multiple different pretrial publicity biases can result in less biased decisions.

=== Belief in myths ===
Belief in rape myths has been noted to impact the rulings of jurors in sexual assault cases; for example, jurors may be more likely to discredit victims who do not show signs of a struggle, despite this not being a requirement for sexual assault.

== Impact of death qualification ==
In capital cases in the United States, prospective jurors who state that they could never vote to impose the death penalty are excluded from the jury through a process known as "death qualification." Various data and studies have suggested the process creates juries that are more likely to convict. For example, a 1984 study by Claudia Cowan, William Thompson, and Phoebe Ellsworth found that fully "death-qualified" juries were significantly more likely to vote guilty than mixed juries including death-penalty opponents, and that jurors who had served on mixed juries were generally more critical of witnesses and better able to remember evidence.

== Bias mitigation ==
Courts and attorneys have used various methods to mitigate bias among jurors, including juror education or instruction about implicit bias and voir dire questioning of jurors (particularly for explicit bias).

A 2025 meta-analysis of sexual assault trials by Jared Walters and colleagues found that expert testimony and juror education were most effective for victim-related bias, and judicial instruction was less effective; while for defendant-related biases, only expert testimony was effective.

== Effectiveness of study methods ==
The advantages and disadvantage of mock juror studies have often been debated in academia, with critics arguing that differences with real trials, such as the common use of undergraduate students, renders their findings less applicable. A 2017 meta-analysis by Brian Bornstein found that guilty verdicts, culpability ratings, and damage awards did not vary based on juror samples, while sentencing and liability judgments showed some difference but had small or contradictory effect sizes. Moderator effects studied were small and inconsistent except for the medium of trial presentation.

== See also ==
- Jury selection
- Implicit-association test
- Wrongful conviction
- Racial bias in criminal news in the United States
