= Phoebe C. Ellsworth =

American psychologist

- Born: 1944 (age 81–82); Hartford, CT
- Education: Bryn Mawr College; Radcliffe College (AB); Stanford University (PhD)
- Spouse: Samuel R. Gross
- Scientific career
- Fields: Social Psychology
- Workplaces: Yale University; Stanford University; University of Michigan
- Thesis: Eye Contact and Gaze Aversion in an Aggressive Encounter (1970)
- Doctoral advisor: J. Merrill Carlsmith
- Notable students: Dacher Keltner; Laura Kubzansky; Samuel Sommers

Phoebe Clemencia Ellsworth is an American social psychologist specializing in two distinct fields: Emotion and legal psychology. She is the Frank Murphy Distinguished University Professor of Psychology and Law (emerita) at the University of Michigan.

== Biography ==
Ellsworth began her college education at Bryn Mawr and received her AB from Radcliffe College in 1966. She earned her PhD in social psychology from Stanford University in 1970. Ellsworth taught at Yale (1971-1981) and Stanford (1981-1987) before moving to the University of Michigan. At Michigan she held dual appointments in the Psychology Department and the Law School until 2008, when she moved full-time into Psychology.

Throughout her career she has served on various editorial boards, advisory committees, and review panels. She was a member of the board of trustees of the Law and Society Association and the Russell Sage Foundation, and of the executive committee of the Society for Experimental Social Psychology and the International Society for Research on Emotion. She has been a board member of the Death Penalty Information Center since 2001.

Ellsworth has two distinct research interests.

First, she is known for her research on emotion. As a graduate student, she worked with Paul Ekman and Wallace Friesen, planning and piloting their research comparing facial recognition of emotion across cultures and developing a precursor to their Facial Affect Coding System. Later, she became increasingly dissatisfied with current theories of emotion, and along with her students Ira Roseman and Craig Smith, she was one of the originators of the current version of the appraisal theory of emotion. Two European psychologists, Klaus Scherer and Nico Frijda, developed remarkably similar theories at about the same time.

According to the appraisal theories of Ellsworth and her students, emotions are elicited and differentiated by an organism’s appraisal of its circumstances and their relevance to its well-being. Emotions are adaptive, providing the perceiver with both an assessment of the situation and the motivation to respond appropriately. Individuals may differ in their appraisals of the "same" situation, and if they do, they will differ in their emotional experience. Likewise, if a person’s appraisal of the situation changes (reappraisal), the emotion will change correspondingly. Emotions are not static, categorically distinct states, but processes, constantly changing as the perceiver’s appraisals change, and therefore providing a potentially infinite variety of emotional experiences, far more than the categories provided by a particular language. The theory also specifies the appraisals that are most important in differentiating emotions: perceptions of novelty, intrinsic valence, certainty, agency (who or what caused the event), goal conduciveness, ability to control the event, and morality.

Ellsworth has also done considerable work on emotion and culture, generally arguing that cultural differences in emotion are largely due to differences in people’s appraisal of the situation.

Ellsworth’s second main research interest is in the field of legal psychology, and she was one of the earliest researchers in this area. As a graduate student, she was disturbed by the fact that courts and legislatures routinely made decisions based on assumptions about human behavior that were not supported by any empirical research. She felt that legislators and judges should consult the social science research related to the questions they were deciding, and that social scientists should provide it. Inspired by the mentorship of Anthony G. Amsterdam, she began a program of research on public opinion on the death penalty, which continued for much of her career. She is also known for her work on jury decision making, particularly in death-qualified juries, and on the relationship between law and social science.

Ellsworth has also written about experimental research methods in social psychology.

Ellsworth is a member of the National Academy of Sciences and a fellow of the American Academy of Arts and Sciences. For her scientific research, she was awarded the Society for Personality and Social Psychology Career Contribution Award and Legacy Award, the Association for Psychological Science James McKeen Cattell Award for Lifetime Achievement in Applied Research, the Society of Experimental Social Psychology Distinguished Scientist Award, and the American Psychological Foundation Gold Medal Award for Life Achievement in the Science of Psychology. For her work as a mentor and advisor to students, she was awarded the American Psychological Association Raymond D. Fowler Award for Outstanding Contributions to Students’ Professional Development, the SPSP Nalini Ambady Award for Mentoring Excellence, and the Association for Psychological Science Mentor Award.
