= Glossip v. Gross =

- Supreme Court of the United States

Argued April 29, 2015 Decided June 29, 2015
- Full case name: Richard E. Glossip, et al. v. Kevin J. Gross, et al.
- Docket no.: 14-7955
- Citations: 576 U.S. 863 (more) 135 S. Ct. 2726; 192 L. Ed. 2d 761
- Argument: Oral argument
- Opinion announcement: Opinion announcement

Case history
- Prior: affirming denial of injunction, 776 F.3d 721 (10th Cir. 2015); denying stays of execution, 135 S. Ct. 824 (2015) (Sotomayor, J., dissenting); cert. granted, 135 S. Ct. 1173 (2015).
- Subsequent: denying stay of execution, 136 S. Ct. 26 (September 30, 2015) (Breyer, J., dissenting).

Holding
- Petitioners have failed to establish a likelihood of success on the merits of their claim that the use of midazolam violates the Eighth Amendment.

Court membership
- Chief Justice John Roberts Associate Justices Antonin Scalia · Anthony Kennedy; Clarence Thomas · Ruth Bader Ginsburg; Stephen Breyer · Samuel Alito; Sonia Sotomayor · Elena Kagan

Case opinions
- Majority: Alito, joined by Roberts, Scalia, Kennedy, Thomas
- Concurrence: Scalia, joined by Thomas
- Concurrence: Thomas, joined by Scalia
- Dissent: Breyer, joined by Ginsburg
- Dissent: Sotomayor, joined by Ginsburg, Breyer, Kagan

Laws applied
- U.S. Const. amend. VIII; 42 U.S.C. § 1983

Glossip v. Gross, 576 U.S. 863 (2015), was a United States Supreme Court case in which the Court held, 5–4, that lethal injections using midazolam to kill prisoners convicted of capital crimes do not constitute cruel and unusual punishment under the Eighth Amendment to the United States Constitution. The Court found that condemned prisoners can only challenge their method of execution after providing a known and available alternative method.

== Background ==
On January 7, 1997, Justin Sneed beat Barry Van Treese to death with a baseball bat. The killing occurred at the Best Budget Inn in Oklahoma City, Oklahoma, where Van Treese was the owner, Sneed was the maintenance-man, and Richard Glossip was the manager. In exchange for avoiding the death penalty, Sneed confessed and told police that Glossip had instructed him to commit the murder.

Glossip insisted on his actual innocence and refused to accept a plea bargain. In July 1998, an Oklahoma jury convicted Glossip of the murder and sentenced him to death. In 2001, the unanimous Oklahoma Court of Criminal Appeals threw out that conviction, calling the case "extremely weak" and finding Glossip had received unconstitutionally ineffective assistance of counsel.

In August 2004, a second Oklahoma jury convicted Glossip of the murder and sentenced him to death. Glossip complained that prosecutors had intimidated his defense attorney into resigning, but in April 2007, the Oklahoma Court of Criminal Appeals affirmed the death sentence, with two judges in the majority, one judge specially concurring, and two judges dissenting. Glossip attracted the advocacy of Sister Helen Prejean, but failed to get the clemency board to consider letters from Sneed's family, who believed Sneed was lying.

After a three-justice plurality opinion of the U.S. Supreme Court upheld the use of the sedative sodium thiopental during lethal injections in Baze v. Rees (2008), disconcerted pharmaceutical companies began refusing to supply states with the drug.

Midazolam

Oklahoma replaced the general anaesthetic with an untested off-label use of midazolam, keeping the drug's origin secret. Condemned prisoners Clayton Lockett and Charles Warner sued, and the state trial court found the secrecy law unconstitutional. However, pending an appeal by Oklahoma Attorney General Scott Pruitt, the Oklahoma Court of Criminal Appeals refused to then stay the plaintiffs' imminent executions, so, on April 21, 2014, the Oklahoma Supreme Court did. Faced with conflicting court orders, Governor Mary Fallin decided to disobey the Supreme Court order, stating that the "attempted stay of execution is outside the constitutional authority of that body". The day after the Oklahoma House of Representatives drafted articles of impeachment against the Supreme Court justices, the court withdrew its stay of execution and reversed the trial court's holding against the state.

On April 29, 2014, Oklahoma used midazolam in the execution of Clayton Lockett. After executioners had performed the lethal injection, Lockett began to struggle on the gurney, reportedly groaning, "this shit is fucking with my mind" and "the drugs aren't working." Lockett died forty-three minutes after the lethal injection. Oklahoma decided to postpone the execution of Warner, who had been scheduled to die that night.

After an investigation, Oklahoma elected to continue using midazolam in executions. On June 25, 2014, Warner, Glossip, and nineteen other Oklahoma death row inmates sued in the United States District Court for the Western District of Oklahoma, alleging that Oklahoma's use of midazolam violated the Eighth Amendment to the United States Constitution. At the end of a three-day hearing, U.S. District Judge Stephen P. Friot orally denied the condemned prisoners' request for a preliminary injunction prohibiting the use of midazolam in their executions. On January 12, 2015, Tenth Circuit Judge Mary Beck Briscoe, joined by (future Supreme Court justice) Neil Gorsuch and Scott Matheson Jr., affirmed.

== Supreme Court of the United States ==
On January 13, 2015, the condemned prisoners petitioned for a writ of certiorari and stays of their executions from the U.S. Supreme Court. The petitioners argued that the midazolam, intended to be used as sedative, would not render them unable to feel the pain of the other two drugs. On January 15, 2015, the Court denied lead petitioner Warner's application for a stay of execution, over the written dissent of Justice Sonia Sotomayor, joined by Justices Ruth Bader Ginsburg, Stephen Breyer, and Elena Kagan. Oklahoma executed Warner later that day.

However, on January 23, the Supreme Court decided to hear the case, staying the surviving petitioners' executions. The proceeding was then renamed, with Richard Glossip as lead petitioner. One hour of arguments were heard on April 29. During oral arguments, four conservative justices expressed impatience with the obstructionist unavailability, which according to Justice Scalia was caused "by the abolitionists putting pressure on the companies that manufacture" the drugs. Justice Alito called this "guerrilla war against the death penalty", and Justice Kennedy insisted to have an answer from the petitioners on whether the court should take this element into account. Four liberal justices, conversely, harshly questioned Oklahoma Solicitor General Patrick Wyrick, with Justice Kagan describing the execution protocol as "burning alive, from the inside."

=== Opinion of the Court ===
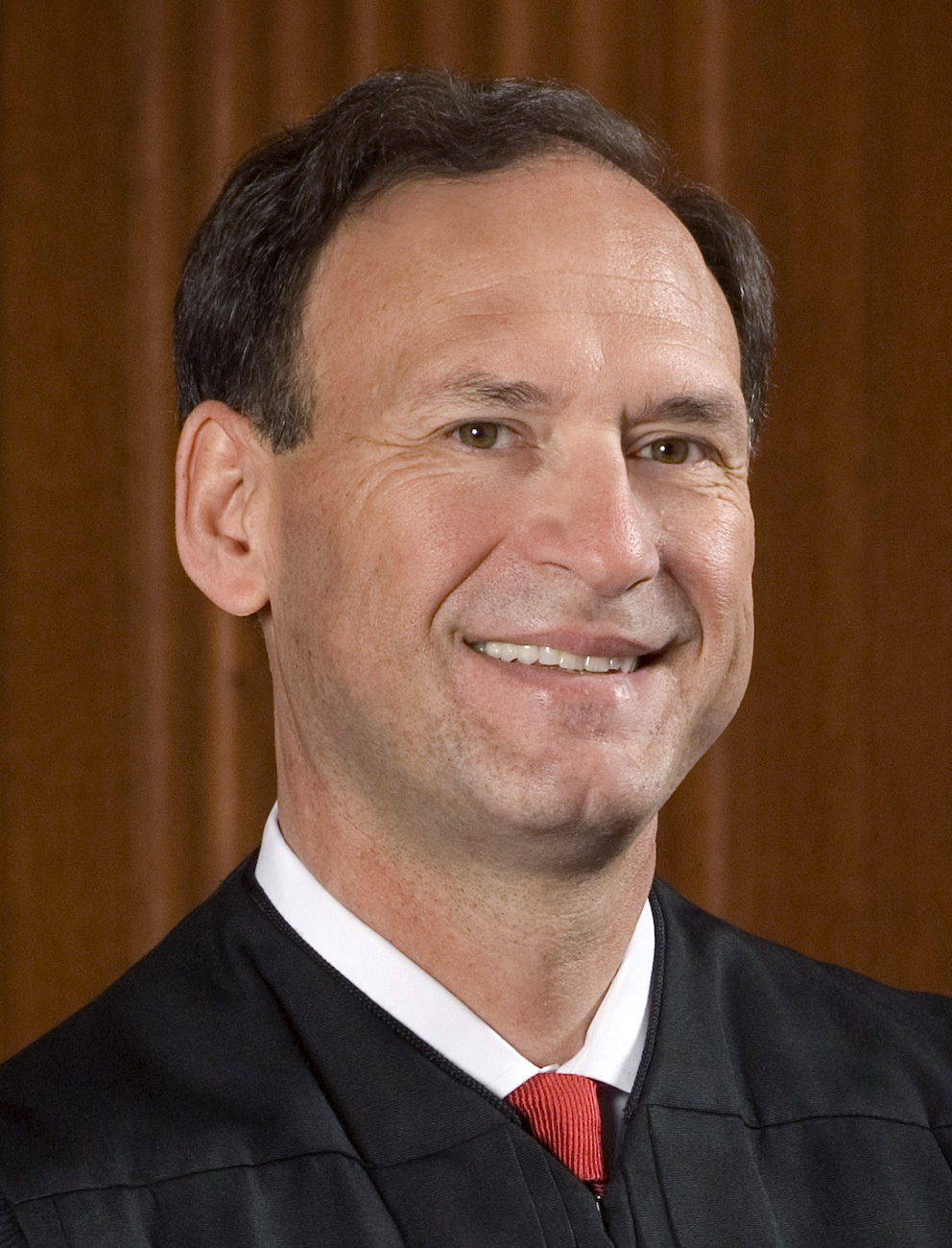
Justice Samuel Alito found that the prisoners "failed to establish a likelihood of success on the merits of their claim that the use of midazolam violates the Eighth Amendment."

On June 29, 2015, the last day of the term, the Supreme Court ruled against the condemned prisoners in a 5–4 decision. At the opinion announcement, Justices Sotomayor and Breyer read aloud their dissents from the bench, while Scalia also read aloud a statement criticizing the Court's "unrealistic" restrictions of the death penalty for "over the past 30 years" and the proposal then by two Justices to eliminate the death penalty entirely.

Justice Samuel Alito delivered the opinion of the Court, joined by Chief Justice John Roberts and Justices Antonin Scalia, Anthony Kennedy and Clarence Thomas. According to the Court, the Eighth Amendment requires prisoners to show there is a known and available alternative method of execution. The prisoners had failed to do this, the Court found, because the alternative drugs they proposed were unavailable to Oklahoma. The Court explained that Hill v. McDonough (2006) did not apply.

Secondly, the Court ruled that the Eighth Amendment requires prisoners to show that the challenged method of execution poses a significant risk of severe pain, emphasizing that the burden of proof rested on the prisoners and not the state. Although midazolam is not recommended or approved by the Food and Drug Administration as an anesthetic, the Court explained that a constitutionally adequate method of execution does not need to meet the medical standard of care.

The Court credited the testimony of Dr. Roswell Lee Evans, Oklahoma's expert witness, that there is "a virtual certainty" prisoners will feel no pain during lethal injection, rejecting the prisoners' "speculative evidence" of midazolam's ceiling effect. Finally, the Court found there was no merit to the prisoners' criticisms that Dr. Evans' report overused unreliable sources, such as drugs.com, and that it contained mathematical errors.

=== Justice Scalia's concurrence ===
Justice Scalia, joined by Justice Thomas, concurred. Scalia attacked Breyer for offering "a white paper devoid of any meaningful legal argument". Mocking Breyer's use of statistics, Scalia wrote "if only Aristotle, Aquinas, and Hume knew that moral philosophy could be so neatly distilled into a pocket-sized, vade mecum 'system of metrics'". Scalia then cited several studies concluding that the death penalty is more deterrent than life in jail.

Given Breyer's call to review precedent, Scalia added his own call to counsel to brief whether Trop v. Dulles (1958) should be overruled. Noting that the capital punishment debate in the United States had been deliberately left open by the Founders, Scalia concluded "by arrogating to himself the power to overturn that decision, Justice Breyer does not just reject the death penalty, he rejects the Enlightenment."

=== Justice Thomas's concurrence ===
Justice Thomas, joined by Justice Scalia, concurred. Thomas wrote that "the best solution is for the Court to stop making up Eighth Amendment claims in its ceaseless quest to end the death penalty through undemocratic means". Thomas wrote separately to clarify that he believes the Eighth Amendment only prohibits executions "deliberately designed to inflict pain." Calling Breyer's use of statistics "pseudoscientific", Thomas found one study's use of "depravity points" dehumanizing. Thomas rejected Breyer's example of a double murderer arbitrarily receiving a lighter sentence than a murderer, citing news reports on WRAL-TV as explanation. Noting that, "in my decades on the Court, I have not seen a capital crime that could not be considered sufficiently 'blameworthy' to merit a death sentence", Thomas concluded by spending several paragraphs graphically describing some of those crimes, including several rapes and several murders committed by the intellectually disabled and by juveniles.

=== Justice Breyer's dissent ===
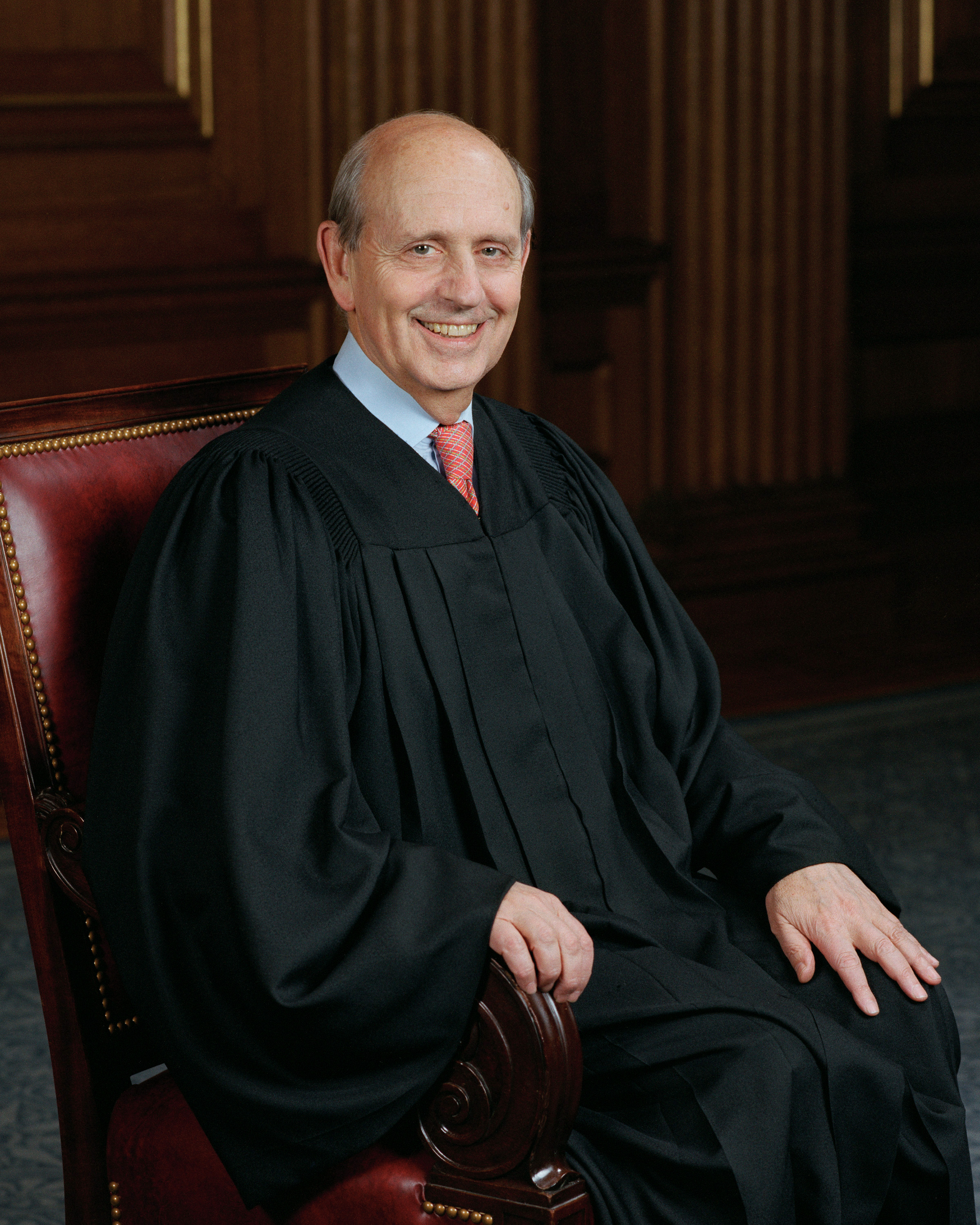
Justice Stephen Breyer wrote in dissent "I believe it highly likely that the death penalty violates the Eighth Amendment."

Justice Stephen Breyer, joined by Justice Ruth Bader Ginsburg, dissented. Explaining that the Constitution did not enshrine the standards of the Bloody Assizes or those found in Blackstone's Commentaries on the Laws of England, Breyer believed that circumstances had radically changed since the death penalty was restored by the Court in Gregg v. Georgia (1976). Breyer gave four reasons for why he believed the court should find against the death penalty:

1) Serious unreliability: Breyer believed the wrongful execution of innocent men was cruel, listing Carlos DeLuna, Cameron Todd Willingham, Joe Arridy, and William Jackson Marion as examples. Breyer cited research that indicates those convicted of capital crimes are more likely to be exonerated. Breyer then described the examples of the conviction and exoneration of Glenn Ford, Henry Lee McCollum (whom Antonin Scalia had previously cited to support his views on the death penalty), and Anthony Ray Hinton.

From this, Breyer concluded that the "intense community pressure" involved in capital cases increases the likelihood of convicting the wrong person. Breyer was also concerned the search for a death-qualified jury might cause bias. Breyer further questioned the reliability of forensic testimony, citing problems with hair analysis. Breyer cited one study concluding that 4% of those sentenced to death are actually innocent. Regardless of the actual innocence of the accused, Breyer cited research identifying prejudicial error in 68% of capital cases. Breyer then included editorials by former Virginia Attorney General Mark Earley rejecting the death penalty.

2) Arbitrariness in application: Breyer believed it is cruel that the death penalty is imposed without reasonable consistency. To show this, he cited a study that attempted to measure the "egregiousness" of different crimes, finding that most death row inmates had not committed worse crimes than those sentenced to life in prison. Rather, Breyer believed the race and gender of the victim is much more important. Because fewer than 2% of counties accounted for the majority of death sentences imposed nationwide from 1976 through 2012, Breyer postulated that the real driver of inconsistent penalties are the local prosecutors, public defender funding, and race distribution. Criticizing the absence of proportionality review, Breyer goes on to cite several anecdotal examples from news media that he felt were particularly arbitrary.

3) Excessive delays: Breyer believed it is cruel that there is a lengthy delay between sentencing and execution, noting that since 1960, the average delay grew from two years to 18. Firstly, Breyer believed longer delays are cruel, noting that solitary confinement had been criticized by the United Nations Special Rapporteur on Torture. Repeatedly issuing and then revoking death warrants is, according to Breyer, also cruel, noting that, before being exonerated, Willie Jerome Manning, Randall Dale Adams, Clarence Brandley, and Earl Washington, Jr. had all come within days or hours of being executed, multiple times. In light of the death row phenomenon, Breyer did not find it surprising that many inmates volunteer to be executed. Breyer next noted the hostility foreign common law courts have shown to delays before executions in Pratt v A-G for Jamaica (1993), S v Makwanyane (1995, South Africa), Soering v United Kingdom (1989, members of the European Convention on Human Rights), and United States v Burns (2001, Canada).

Secondly, Breyer believed the only punishment rationales for the death penalty are deterrence and retributive justice. Breyer believed that the death penalty has no deterrent value. Likewise, Breyer believed that retribution is almost as well achieved by life in prison without parole. Breyer did not believe the Founders could have contemplated decades long delays when they wrote the Eighth Amendment. Breyer highlighted that, after retiring from the Court, Justice Lewis F. Powell Jr. testified to Congress that he had changed his mind and now thought excessive delays made the death penalty unconstitutional.

4) Most places within the United States have abandoned its use: Beside being cruel, Breyer believed the death penalty is also unusual because it has become rare. Noting that 41 states had the death penalty before the Court blocked it in 1972, now there are 27, and only three, Texas, Missouri, and Florida, account for 80% of executions. After listing execution statistics, Breyer next considered polling data and an American Law Institute report. Breyer finally considered the death penalty as even more unusual by looking at a vote by the United Nations General Assembly, reports by the International Commission Against the Death Penalty and Amnesty International statistics.

Breyer appended to his dissent five pages of graphs, tables, and maps.

=== Justice Sotomayor's dissent ===
Justice Sonia Sotomayor filed a dissent, in which Justices Ginsburg, Breyer, and Elena Kagan joined. Sotomayor stated that "under the Court's new rule, it would not matter whether the State intended to use midazolam, or instead to have petitioners drawn and quartered, slowly tortured to death, or actually burned at the stake: because petitioners failed to prove the availability of sodium thiopental or pentobarbital, the State could execute them using whatever means it designates." Sotomayor attacked the credence the Court gave to Oklahoma's expert witness, writing "Dr. Evans' conclusions were entirely unsupported by any study or third-party source, contradicted by the extrinsic evidence proffered by petitioners, inconsistent with the scientific understanding of midazolam's properties, and apparently premised on basic logical errors." Sotomayor contended Dr. Evans' testimony that midazolam could "paralyze the brain" was directly refuted by peer-reviewed articles cited by the prisoners' expert witnesses.

The majority erred, Sotomayor argued, by "imposing a wholly unprecedented obligation on the condemned inmate to identify an available means for his or her own execution". Calling the Court's holding "legally indefensible", she argued the Court had failed to distinguish Hill v. McDonough (2006), and went on to criticize the Court for treating the plurality opinion in Baze v. Rees (2008) as precedent, noting that the Court was ignoring the concurring opinions necessary to achieve that judgment. Condemned prisoners should not be required to meet an additional burden of proof, in Sotomayor's view, simply because they face executions that "States hurriedly devise as they scramble to locate new and untested drugs". Finally, Sotomayor anticipated that, due to the prevalence of botched executions, those condemned to die will increasingly choose execution by firing squad.

== Subsequent developments ==
Oklahoma Attorney General Scott Pruitt scheduled Glossip to die on September 30, 2015. However, Governor Mary Fallin ordered the sentence halted one hour before the execution, explaining that the state did not have in its possession the correct drugs. An Oklahoma grand jury report in May 2016 revealed that the state had obtained the wrong drugs during the execution of Charles Warner, lethally injecting him with potassium acetate instead of potassium chloride.

Commentators complained that the Court majority had applied the preliminary injunction factors from Winter v. Natural Resources Defense Council (2008) as four separate necessary elements, upsetting the balancing test and sliding scale approaches the circuit and district courts had been using to weigh the factors against each other.

=== Glossip v. Chandler ===
Following the end of Oklahoma's moratorium on executions, on February 27, 2020, more than two dozen inmates filed a motion to reopen Glossip v. Gross in the United States District Court for the Western District of Oklahoma, claiming the new lethal injection protocol was incomplete. Although the United States Supreme Court had ruled on the case at the preliminary injunction stage, the ruling had involved an earlier version of Oklahoma's lethal injection protocol. On March 19, 2020, the case was officially reopened and in July 2020 the case was renamed Glossip v. Chandler.

== See also ==
- List of United States Supreme Court cases, volume 576
- Richard Glossip
- Baze v. Rees (2008)
- Bucklew v. Precythe (2019)
- Glossip v. Chandler
- Glossip v. Oklahoma (2025)
- Execution of Joseph Wood
- Execution of Clayton Lockett
- Roswell Lee Evans, a noted witness in the case

Executions carried out in Oklahoma
| Preceded by Clayton Lockett April 29, 2014 | Charles Frederick Warner; January 15, 2015 | Succeeded by John Grant October 28, 2021 |
Executions carried out in the United States
| Preceded by Andrew Howard Brannan – Georgia January 13, 2015 | Charles Frederick Warner – Oklahoma; January 15, 2015 | Succeeded by Johnny Shane Kormondy – Florida January 15, 2015 |
