= Coup de Theatre =

Coup de Theatre may refer to:

- Coup de théâtre, a literary term for an unexpected event in a play or a theatrical trick
- Coup de Theatre (album), by Haiku d'Etat, 2004
- "Coup de théâtre", a 2015 TV episode of Les Mystères de l'amour
- "Coup De Théâtre", a track on the 2005 album Soleil 12 by Forgas Band Phenomena

== See also ==
- Perry Mason moment, when information is unexpectedly and dramatically introduced In court proceedings
