= Kubzansky =

Kubzansky is a surname. Notable people with the surname include:

- Jessica Kubzansky, American theatre director
- Laura Kubzansky, psychologist
