= Jeff Kukucka =

Legal psychologist

- Education: Doctorate of Philosophy in Psychology from CUNY Graduate Center
- Alma mater: John Jay College of Criminal Justice
- Known for: Professor of Psychology at Towson University

Jeff Kukucka is a legal psychologist specializing in wrongful convictions. As of October 2024, he is an associate professor at Towson University.

== Education ==
Jeff Kukucka received his Bachelor's of Arts from Loyola College in Maryland in Psychology in 2009. While at Loyola College, Kukucka began engaging in research with Kerri Goodwin in conformity in relation to eyewitness memory. Following this, he received his M.A. in Forensic Psychology from John Jay College of Criminal Justice (2012) and his Ph.D. from CUNY Graduate Center (2014). Kukucka participated in research on forensic interviewing when it comes to juveniles as well as metacognition while working with Maggie Bruck. Finally, while pursuing his Ph.D, Kukucka worked primarily under Saul Kassin in Psychology and Law. Jeff Kukucka's education was a culminated with his dissertation entitled An Investigation of Factors that Create and Mitigate Confirmation Bias in Judgments of Handwriting Evidence

== Research ==
Kukucka's research primarily revolves around wrongful convictions with a focus on both the causes and the resulting impact. This research becomes narrowed with a particular interest in errors in regards to the forensic evidence as well as what life is like for individuals following an exoneration due to a wrongful conviction. During his time at Towson University, Kukucka leads the Psychology and Law at Towson (PLaTo) Lab where members of the lab seek to bridge the gap between psychology and how improvements can be made to the criminal justice system. Through this lab, both undergraduate and master's students are brought together to make up this research team. Outside of wrongful convictions, Kukucka also engages in research related to police interrogations and false confessions.

One 2020 study took a look at the challenges that individuals face following an exoneration when attempting to return to the work force. Kukucka, et al. looked to identify a potential bias towards people who have been exonerated of a crime by hiring managers. This was done by recruiting hiring managers and assigning them to separate conditions; one condition reviewed the application of an exonerated individual, one condition reviewed the application of an individual correctly convicted of a felony, and one condition that reviewed the application of an individual with no connection to the justice system. Researchers found that those applicants who were exonerated of a crime were viewed similarly to the applicants who were convicted of felonies.

== Awards and honors ==
- 2024 Early Career Teaching and Mentoring Award, American Psychology-Law Society
- 2021 Rising Star, Association for Psychological Science
- 2020 Saleem Shah Award for Early Career Excellence, American Psychology-Law Society
- 2020 Distinguished Young Alumnus Award, St. Paul's School for Boys
- 2018 Honors College Professor of the Year, Towson University
- 2017 Psi Chi Eastern Regional Faculty Advisor Award
- 2014 Dissertation Award (Third Place), American Psychology-Law Society
- 2009 Grindall Psychology Medal, Loyola College in Maryland
- Member of Phi Beta Kappa, Psi Chi, and Phi Sigma Tau Honors societies
