= Roswell Lee Evans =

Roswell Lee Evans, originally from Georgia, is the former Dean of the Harrison School of Pharmacy at Auburn University and an alleged expert on the use of the benzodiazepine midazolam for carrying out the death penalty.

== Glossip v. Gross ==
Beginning in April 2015, Evans' credibility and qualifications as an expert witness became heavily criticized when the case of Glossip v. Gross went before the Supreme Court of the United States of America. At this time, it was revealed that over 150 pages of the report he provided in his testimony came directly from the consumer website Drugs.com, an online pharmaceutical encyclopedia whose material, according to the website's own disclaimer, is not intended to be used as medical advice or diagnosis, or for treatment.

Evans’ opinion as an expert on midazolam has also been criticized due to his testimony regarding the mechanism of action of benzodiazepines. Evans testified that:

“Midazolam attaches to GABA receptors, inhibiting GABA […] that's what generates the clinical effect or the pharmacological effect from midazolam and all the other benzodiazepine drugs.”

and further stated:

“GABA receptors are responsible for anxiety disorders. So when you basically inhibit GABA, you basically begin to control those kind [sic] of symptoms”.

These statements drew criticism as they describe the exact opposite of benzodiazepines, which actually work by enhancing the effect of the neurotransmitter gamma-aminobutyric acid (GABA) at the GABA_{A} receptor. By enhancing the effects of GABA, benzodiazepines produce sedative, hypnotic (sleep-inducing), anxiolytic (anti-anxiety), anticonvulsant, and muscle relaxing effects.

During his testimony, Evans stated that he was a doctor of pharmacy (PharmD) and not a medical doctor (MD), that he had never personally induced anesthesia in a patient, and that he could not make evaluations and then prescribe dosages of drugs for particular situations without a collaborative agreement.

== See also ==
- List of Auburn University people
