= Perry Mason moment =

Moment during a trial that radically shifts the likely outcome

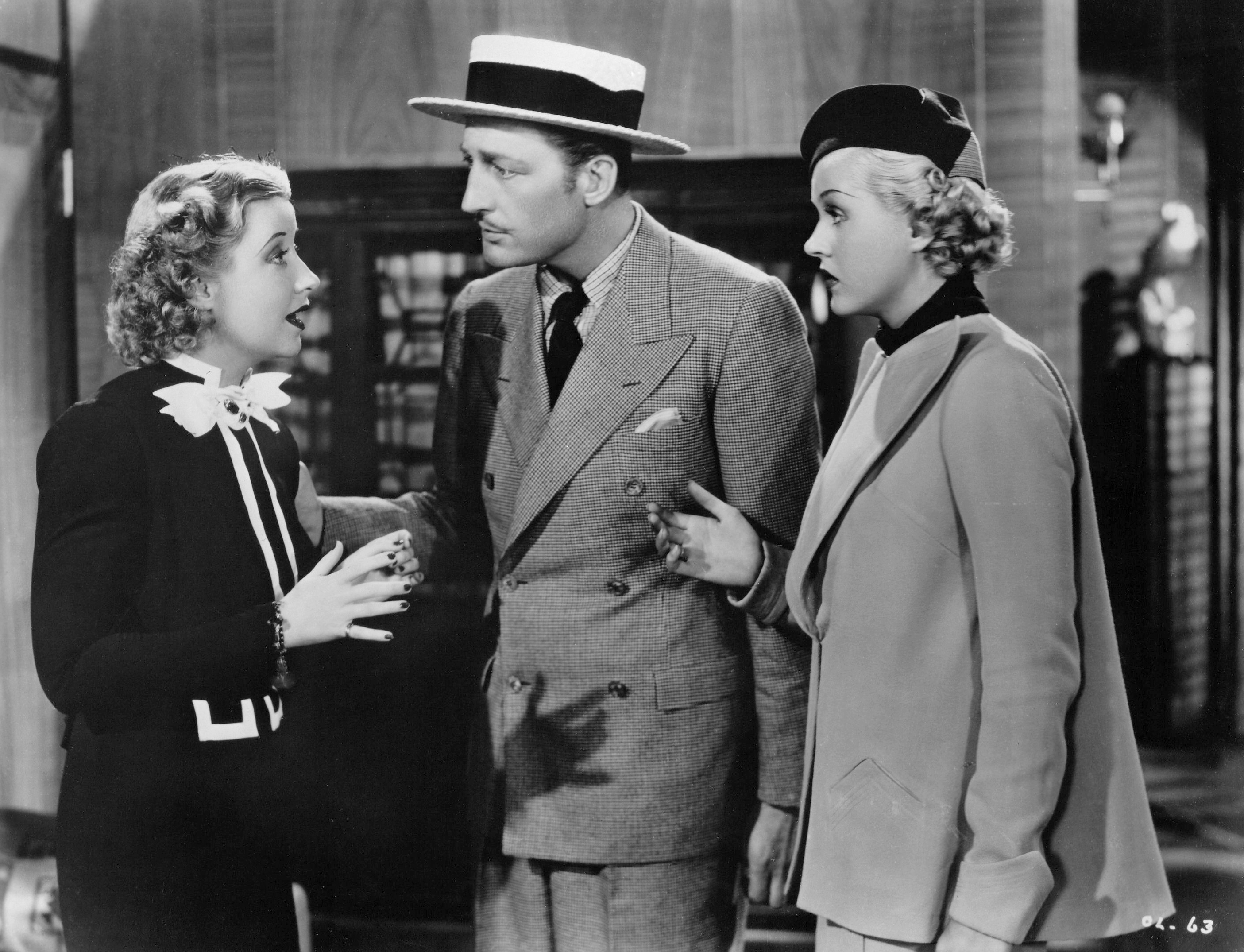
Perry Mason as portrayed by Warren William (centre) in The Case of the Lucky Legs (1935).

In court proceedings in the United States, a Perry Mason moment is a dramatic, unexpected revelation during a legal trial, usually from a witness's testimony; sometimes it is new evidence. It takes its name from Perry Mason, the fictional lawyer in the works of Erle Stanley Gardner, where such dramatic reversals occurred, often when witnesses confess to crimes that others were accused of in response to the sudden exposure of an inconsistency in their alibi.

Modern discovery rules make Perry Mason moments rare in actual American court proceedings. Both sides are largely aware of what the other plans to introduce as evidence, and judges usually stay or continue proceedings when a party informs the court it has uncovered new evidence, in order that the opposing party be sufficiently prepared. Lawyers, too, prefer not to ask witnesses questions when they do not have a good idea what the response will be. Perry Mason moments that do occur, such as those on live television during the first Menendez brothers trial and the O. J. Simpson trial, are often the result of careful planning by the lawyers. Gambles by lawyers have also resulted in Perry Mason moments, sometimes not for their side, and some have occurred completely spontaneously.

== Judicial attitude ==
The judicial system tries to avoid Perry Mason moments to keep trials fair. In 2001, the federal court for the Northern District of Iowa granted a drug defendant a new trial over prosecutorial misconduct. Among the misdeeds that it cited to support the motion was the testimony elicited from one government cooperating witness who had agreed to take the stand in return for plea agreements or immunity. The witness, visibly nervous, was asked after being sworn in why this was so. She told the prosecutor that another driver had given her the finger and attempted to run her off the road on the way to court that morning; after being asked if she recognized that person, she identified him by name and also as the defendant's sister's boyfriend. The court found that level of detail completely unnecessary, as there were other possible causes of her condition, including a medical diagnosis of anxiety, and it was only when the prosecutor asked that the jury and the defense became aware the driver was connected to the defendant. "Moreover," wrote the district's chief judge, Mark W. Bennett, who had presided over the trial, "this type of a 'Perry Mason' moment, replete with the elements of surprise and prejudice, is precisely the type of matter that should be taken up with the court outside the presence of the jury."

Courts have sometimes cited the unlikelihood of a Perry Mason moment in real life as a justification for their rulings. In 2005, Kent A. Jordan, then sitting on the federal District of Delaware, denied a defense request to grant immunity to a real estate broker the defendant believed had actually been the one to forge a lease rather than the defendants themselves, as the government alleged, so the broker would have no fear of self-incrimination and be compelled to testify. "[I]t is not at all clear that the real estate broker's testimony would be exculpatory", he wrote. "On the contrary, it appears that Leary merely hopes that his counsel will be able to break the broker down on cross-examination. A prayer for a Perry Mason moment does not constitute the kind of 'clearly exculpatory' evidence contemplated in [a precedent].

Five years later, the Seventh Circuit heard the appeal of two bank robbers who argued that the trial judge had, by disallowing a line of questioning on cross-examination over one key witness's motivations for testifying, violated their Sixth Amendment right to effective assistance of counsel. The court agreed but held the violation harmless error given the overwhelming evidence against the defendants, who also could not have been certain as to whether the witness would testify as they had hoped. "It is unlikely that counsel expected Simmons to break down on the stand and admit that his perjury was part of an elaborate scheme to frame the defendants", wrote Judge Daniel A. Manion. "Only Perry Mason enjoyed such moments."

"Defendants' argument seems to assume the existence of a Perry Mason-like world in which prosecution witnesses readily give up impeaching information when interviewed or questioned by defense counsel", wrote Judge Matthew Kennelly of the Northern District of Illinois in 2011 when holding for a plaintiff suing the Chicago police over malicious prosecution after he was cleared of a 1993 murder. The police had argued possibly exculpatory material did not have to be turned over because witnesses examined by the defense at trial were aware of the information and could have testified to it. "Real life does not work that way, or at least the governing legal rule cannot realistically be premised on the assumption that it always works that way."

In 2014, the federal court for the Eastern District of Louisiana granted a defense motion to disqualify plaintiff's counsel on the grounds that the lawyer would be an essential witness for the case and none of the exceptions in the state bar's code of conduct that would allow a lawyer to be both witness and advocate in a case applied. The attorney had argued that he might not have to testify if the defendant, upon taking the stand, completely corroborated his client's version of events. Judge Jane Triche Milazzo described this argument as "[depending] on the occurrence of a 'Perry Mason' moment in the courtroom." In denying it, she noted that "in the Court's experience, such moments are usually confined to fictional courtrooms."

More generally, a federal bankruptcy judge once noted that "[i]t is a truism (Perry Mason aside) that parties virtually never admit at trial that they acted with an intent to deceive or defraud the opposing party." "From time to time the new evidence surfaces à la Perry Mason during trial and there is a dismissal", wrote Minnesota Court of Appeals judge Robert A. Randall, a veteran criminal defense lawyer, in 1994. "But I suggest Perry Mason endings tend only to happen on late night TV if your station carries reruns." Judge D. Michael Fisher of the Third Circuit Court of Appeals, dissenting from the majority's grant of habeas corpus relief over, among other things, evidence not shared with the defense in the case that could likely have exculpated the petitioner, wrote that "a dramatic courtroom reversal is more likely in a Matlock or Perry Mason script than in reality."

Both appellate and trial judges have sometimes recognized Perry Mason moments when they believe they occurred in the trial and were decisive. In the late 2010s, defense counsel for an Arkansas man on trial for robbery who asserted mistaken identity and poor police work found, shortly before cross-examining a police officer who had testified to thoroughly examining and inventorying the contents of the defendant's jacket, a plastic straw in one of the pockets that was not mentioned in the inventory. During cross-examination, after eliciting a reiteration of the officer's testimony, the lawyer asked the officer to check the jacket again, whereupon he discovered the straw. "The defense had its Perry Mason moment", wrote state Supreme Court Justice Josephine L. Hart, dissenting from her colleagues' denial of review after the court declared a mistrial afterwards when the prosecution accused the defense of planting it. "[S]hoddy police work was exposed." In deciding a 2003 patent infringement case, Wayne Andersen of the Northern District of Illinois wrote of a "a very rare Perry Mason-esque moment" when the plaintiff patentee conceded on the stand that the defendant's pool cover was not topped with a dark material like his patent had described his own, resulting in "the least difficult infringement analysis this Court has ever been required to perform" and summary judgement for defendants.

== History ==
In his 2010 book I Love It When You Talk Retro, author Ralph Keyes connects the term to the Perry Mason TV series, which ran from 1957 to 1966. "As played by portly Raymond Burr", he wrote, "Perry Mason was a resourceful lawyer who generally pulled his client's chestnuts out of the fire at the last minute with some deftly posed question or just-discovered piece of evidence. The many times this happened inspired common references to a Perry Mason moment, a dramatic denouement during legal proceedings when everything becomes clear."

The earliest instance of life imitating art to have been called a Perry Mason moment in retrospect occurred in a 1983 Maryland trial. Harlow Brian Sails was accused of murdering an off-duty Prince George's County police officer while robbing a jewelry store a year earlier with three accomplices. All of them had been sentenced to life for both crimes when Sails' trial began. Conflicting eyewitness testimony cast what could have been reasonable doubt on Sails' role in the crime. He denied the charges, but recanted on cross-examination and confessed to the murder while on the witness stand. "I was lying to you before," he admitted to the prosecutor. "I want to let you know that I am guilty. I killed him."

=== First Menendez brothers trial ===
The term did not get used in news coverage of trials until the early 1990s. It occurred during a highly publicized trial broadcast live on television, when a prosecutor's question to a defendant undermined a key aspect of his defense and increased popular perception of his guilt.

In 1993, Lyle and Erik Menendez went on trial in Los Angeles for the murder of their parents four years earlier. They admitted to the killings, but claimed they were a reaction to years of abuse. Since their father, José Menendez, was a wealthy studio executive, the case attracted considerable media attention. The trial was televised live on Court TV, where many viewers found its narratives akin to a soap opera.

On direct examination, both claimed that the brothers went to a nearby Big 5 store to buy handguns, ostensibly to protect themselves from their parents, only to find out that there was a mandatory waiting period of seven days before they could take possession of the weapons. So, they drove to San Diego where they bought the shotguns they eventually used on their parents, for which no wait was required. When cross-examining Erik, prosecutor Lester Kuriyama focused on that aspect of his testimony, asking him to clarify whether he and Lyle had looked at revolvers or more modern "automatic" handguns, and what caliber they had considered. Then he asked Erik "Mr. Menendez, did you know that Big 5 stopped selling handguns in March of 1986?"

Although Erik responded, after a long pause, that he did not know that and that he and his brother had indeed looked at handguns when they visited the store, in the opinion of many watching he was caught in a lie. It now seemed as if, as the prosecution alleged, the killings were premeditated efforts by the brothers to claim their parents' fortune. Writer Dominick Dunne, who covered the trial for Vanity Fair, described the aftermath in the courtroom:

Television, which is not allowed to show the juries, and which rarely shows the spectators or the media, did not convey the full effect of that moment in the courtroom—the gasps, the openmouthed expression on the faces of some of the jurors, the grim bowed heads of certain family members. The word "electrifying" hardly conveys the shock of that moment ... [H]e had lied, and Kuriyama had caught him.

The tip that led to the question was phoned into the Los Angeles County District Attorney's office by a Court TV viewer. Kuriyama received death threats afterward, and wore a bulletproof vest to work for a few days. At the end of the year humorist Paul Slansky described the whole incident as a "'Perry Mason' moment" in a multiple-choice quiz on the trial in Newsweek, one of the earliest uses of the term in a major national publication. Despite the high drama the question created and the increased perception of the brothers' guilt, the separate juries deadlocked on the charges, resulting in a mistrial. At their second trial, in 1996, which had one jury and was not televised, the two were convicted and are now serving life sentences.

=== O. J. Simpson trial ===
Within a year of the first Menendez brothers' trial, in June 1994, Nicole Brown Simpson, former wife of football star O. J. Simpson, and Ron Goldman, a waiter at a restaurant near her home in Los Angeles's Brentwood neighborhood, were found brutally murdered in front of her home. A few days later, police charged Simpson with the crime. After a televised live slow-speed chase, Simpson surrendered to the Los Angeles Police Department (LAPD), while maintaining his innocence. His trial provided another Perry Mason moment, one triggered by the evidence, rather than a lawyer's question or a witness's answer, which was seen as helpful to his defense.

A key piece of evidence against Simpson was a pair of bloody gloves, one found at the crime scene and the other near a guest house at his mansion. DNA tests matched the blood on both to the victims. Simpson's lawyers alleged that the glove found at his home had actually been with its mate at the crime scene, where LAPD detective Mark Fuhrman hid it in his sock and planted it in Simpson's yard during a search of the latter. They also raised questions about how the gloves were handled and processed by the LAPD crime lab, suggesting some of the blood was planted at that stage of the investigation as well.

When it introduced the gloves as evidence at trial, the prosecution called Richard Rubin, a former executive at Aris Isotoner, the maker of the gloves, as an expert witness, to verify that gloves shown on Simpson's hands in footage of him covering a football game were the same model as those found at the crime scene and a pair purchased by Nicole a year before the murders, on a trip to New York. While he testified, he and prosecutor Christopher Darden regularly referred to the actual gloves, which were present in the courtroom. During a break, Robert Shapiro, one of Simpson's attorneys, picked them up and tried them on himself. They fit tightly, and he doubted that they would fit Simpson since his client's hands were much larger.

Another of Simpson's attorneys, F. Lee Bailey, had also been studying the gloves for a long time and had reached a similar conclusion, that the gloves did not fit Simpson and if they could be shown not to in open court, the prosecution's case would fall apart. When he saw Shapiro try on the gloves, he sensed an opportunity. The defense lawyers realized early on that Darden had "hot buttons" which, if pressed, would lead him to act rashly, to the possible detriment of the prosecution.

Bailey went up to Darden in the hallway outside the courtroom and began talking to him. "Chris, you're a good shit," Bailey recalled saying, "but you've got the balls of a stud field mouse." Indignant, as Bailey expected, Darden asked him what he meant. "You're not going to have our client try on these gloves, are you?" he asked in response. "They probably won't fit, and you may not wish to find out. But if, as I suspect, you lack the balls to find out, we might find out for you."

Bailey knew that it would carry more impact if the gloves failed to fit after the prosecution instead of the defense requested the defendant try them on. When the trial resumed, Darden asked Rubin questions about an undamaged pair of the same Isotoner gloves that Rubin had brought along. Johnnie Cochran, the lead defense lawyer, requested a sidebar under the pretense that he didn't understand what Darden was attempting to do. The prosecutor told Judge Lance Ito that he wanted to have Simpson try on the gloves. Cochran protested that such a demonstration could be made if and when Simpson testified, and that if it were done at this point in the trial it would be better to do it away from the TV cameras as Simpson "[didn't] want this to seem like he was giving some kind of performance."

All of those objections were meant to make Darden even more determined to have Simpson try on the gloves, which they did, and Cochran relented after the sidebar. Simpson struggled for some time but could not get either glove to fit. "Marcia Clark [the lead prosecutor] turned white but did not move from her seat," wrote author and filmmaker Lawrence Schiller, in American Tragedy, his inside account of the trial from the defense perspective.

Since it was the end of the day, the failed glove demonstration dominated news coverage of the trial. Darden tried to mitigate the damage the next day with testimony about how the glove might have shrunk, but by the weekend commentators on the trial were calling the impact permanent. "[T]he prosecution created a 'Perry Mason' moment that could provide the basis for some jurors' reasonable doubt," said UCLA law professor Peter Arenella. "[It also] solved the defense problem of how to get O. J. before the jury without being cross-examined." Nor had their efforts to recover helped them much, in the opinion of defense attorney Jill Lansing. "Detailed explanations regarding shrinkage ran headlong into the old adage that one picture is worth a thousand words," she told the Los Angeles Times. "The timing sends the jury away for the weekend with the ill-fitting glove image virtually unimpaired."

Until that point the defense team's best-case scenario had been a hung jury; afterwards they began to seriously consider the possibility of an acquittal. In his closing argument, Cochran turned the glove demonstration into a metaphor for the inconsistencies throughout the prosecution case, using the phrase "If it doesn't fit, you must acquit" repeatedly. A day later, the jury returned a verdict of not guilty on all charges. Simpson was later found liable for the deaths in a civil suit brought by the victims' relatives; he served time in a Nevada prison for a 2007 burglary and was released in October 2017.

=== Sylvia Likens case ===
In the trial about the murder of Sylvia Likens, when Gertrude Baniszewski's 11-year-old daughter, Marie Baniszewski, was called to the stand as a witness for the defense, she broke down and admitted that she had been forced to heat the needle with which Richard Hobbs had carved Likens' skin, and that she had seen her mother beating Sylvia, and forcing her into the basement. In describing the event, crimelibrary.com states, "...Perry Mason-like, the witness for the defense turned into one for the prosecution."

=== Alex Jones defamation lawsuit ===
In 2022, alt-right radio show host and conspiracy theorist Alex Jones went on trial for a defamation lawsuit filed on behalf of the parents of victims in the Sandy Hook shooting, whom Alex Jones had called "crisis actors" due to his false assertions that the shooting was a hoax perpetrated by gun control advocates. Lawyer for the plaintiffs Mark Bankston revealed to Jones during cross-examination that Jones' lawyers had mistakenly sent Bankston a total of approximately 300 gigabytes of data including a complete digital archive of Jones' text messages and phone data for nearly two years prior to the lawsuit. Furthermore, Jones' lawyers were notified of the mistake and had failed to claim that the records were protected under client-attorney privilege, allowing Bankston to provide the evidence during the trial. These messages revealed information that directly contradicted prior testimony from Jones, indicating that he had lied under oath. In response, Jones told Bankston, "I guess this is your Perry Mason moment."

=== In other contexts ===
By the 2010s, use of the term began to migrate to other contexts besides trials. Former president Barack Obama was credited with having engineered one during one of his debates with Republican challenger Mitt Romney. After Romney charged that Obama had not initially described the recent attack on the U.S. consulate in Benghazi, Libya, as an "act of terror," Obama stood firm and insisted that he had in the Rose Garden the day afterwards, saying "Please proceed, governor," asking that moderator Candy Crowley look up the transcript of his remarks online. While Romney reiterated his criticism, Crowley did so, and confirmed Obama's account. "It was to be Mitt Romney's 'Perry Mason' moment," according to journalist Robert Parry in Consortium News. "[But while he] may have thought he was Perry Mason ... he ended up looking more like Mason's inept adversary, the haplessly wrong prosecutor Hamilton Burger."

The following year Supreme Court justice Elena Kagan was credited with creating one during oral argument. In United States v. Windsor, Paul Clement, a former Solicitor General like herself, was defending the constitutionality of the Defense of Marriage Act, which had allowed states to refuse to recognize same-sex marriages performed in other states. He argued that, when passing it, Congress had merely intended to protect the states' ability to maintain their own definition of marriage, since under the Constitution's Full Faith and Credit Clause, they would have to accept such marriages as legally valid. Shortly afterwards, Kagan quoted language to Clement from the House report on the bill that said "Congress decided to reflect an honor of collective moral judgment and to express moral disapproval of homosexuality" in passing it. This not only conflicted with Clement's claims, it invoked what the Court had subsequently held to be an impermissible justification for such legislation. "Does [it] say that? Of course, [it does]," Clement conceded. "And if that's enough to invalidate the statute, then you should invalidate the statute." In Slate, law professor Adam Winkler later called that "the closest the Supreme Court gets to a Perry Mason moment," and observed that it did indeed take Clement's suggestion three months later.

== As trial tactic ==
"Although in film and television shows about trials, dramatically charged moments are a dime a dozen, in real trials there are rarely surprise elements or revelations," Dunne wrote of Kuriyama's surprise question for Erik Menendez. "Everything is hashed out between prosecution and defense before a witness takes the stand, and either side can object to something the other side plans to ask a witness—a process that virtually eliminates the possibility of surprise." Nevertheless, lawyers desire them. "We all wait in our careers for that Perry Mason moment that never comes in a trial ... when someone stands up in the court and screams 'Yes, I did it!'" agrees Jonathan Turley, a George Washington University Law School professor who frequently appears as a legal commentator and analyst. "Every attorney dreams about it because it rarely, if ever, happens," notes Iowa lawyer Karen Thalacker. "Why doesn't it happen? Because cross-examination is one of the most difficult things a lawyer does."

Completely unplanned Perry Mason moments do occur. The Southern District of Mississippi recounted the "Perry Mason outcome" of a 1990s slip and fall suit after a plaintiff's witness, confronted on cross-examination with evidence contradicting her claim not to have known the plaintiff prior to the suit, recanted her testimony to avoid perjury charges; the plaintiff then moved for the suit's dismissal with prejudice. Bell Island, a Nebraska defense lawyer specializing in drunken-driving cases, won an acquittal for a client after the prosecution's expert witness on the breath-testing machine used by the police told him "you know that machine better than I do," while being cross-examined. But many of those that do occur are, like the Simpson and Menendez examples above, the result of careful planning or calculated risks by the trial attorneys.

Morley Swingle, the elected prosecuting attorney for Cape Girardeau County, Missouri, and a published mystery novelist, recounts how his extensive preparation for the cross-examination of an expert witness led to a Perry Mason moment, as recognized by a journalist present. The defendant was a teenage boy accused of killing his girlfriend. After denying any involvement until other evidence of his presence had become indisputable, he later claimed the gun had gone off accidentally while he was trying to prevent her from shooting herself. To support its theory, the defense had called a psychologist, Ann Dinwiddie, to argue based on some of the victim's letters that she was suicidal, a process she called a "psychological autopsy."

Swingle researched the scientific literature on the subject as part of his extensive preparation for the cross. He found that the concept was both highly controversial within the psychiatric and psychological communities, and older than Dinwiddie claimed. At trial he got Dinwiddie to admit that she had only reviewed the victim's letters, had not been allowed to speak at length with any of her family members, and could not officially make a diagnosis as she was, unlike a psychiatrist, not a physician. Finally he asked if she agreed with a statement by Harvard Medical School psychiatry professor Harrison Pope that "it would be pure speculation for a psychiatrist to try to give a formal diagnosis of a dead person he has never met." She did agree, undermining her previous testimony. Seeing how effective that answer was, he ended the examination at that point. After a short redirect examination, she left the courtroom in tears. A cameraman for a local TV station called him "Perry Mason" afterwards. The defendant was convicted of second-degree murder, and sentenced to life.

Eric Dubin, the attorney for Bonnie Lee Bakley's family in their civil suit against actor Robert Blake over her death, took a gamble during the trial that resulted in a Perry Mason moment. The day he had the girlfriend of Blake's co-defendant Earle Caldwell on the stand, who knew both him and Blake well, he decided to ask her if she believed they were involved in the crime, something no one had asked her before. "Dead silence filled the court," he recalled. "Tears filled her eyes as she paused for what seemed like a decade, then leaned into the microphone and said that yes, she did believe that they were involved." Had she answered differently, Dubin believes, it would still have been a Perry Mason moment, but one "that could have cost me the whole trial." Blake and Caldwell, like Simpson, were held civilly liable for a crime they had been acquitted of.

Real-life Perry Mason moments, like their fictional antecedents, have often occurred during cross-examinations. San Francisco personal-injury lawyer Miles Cooper suggests that, with the right approach, they can come on directs as well. "Almost every lawyer, and for that matter juror, craves the Perry Mason moment," he writes. He recalls as an archetypal fictional example the scene in A Few Good Men where Jack Nicholson as Col. Jessup says "You're goddamn right I did!" as he admits to ordering the beating two of his subordinates are on trial for. "Lawyers strive for that crackle, that intensity. With a little effort, your directs can produce similar moments."

== See also ==
- CSI effect, where jurors have been found to put great weight on the quantity, or lack thereof, of forensic evidence introduced by the prosecution as a result of that television franchise, which focuses on that aspect of criminal investigation
- Perry Mason syndrome, where jurors have voted to convict because of the absence of Perry Mason moments in a trial, regardless of the actual evidence.
