= Willie Jerome Manning =

American man on death row in Mississippi

- Mugshot of Manning
- Born: Willie Jerome Manning; June 12, 1968 (age 58)
- Other name: Fly
- Status: Current; Incarcerated on death row (Steckler-Miller); 2015; Exonerated (Jimmerson-Jordan)
- Convictions: 1994; Capital murder (Steckler-Miller); 1996; Capital murder (Jimmerson-Jordan)
- Criminal charges: 1992; Capital murder (Steckler-Miller); 1993; Capital murder (Jimmerson-Jordan)
- Penalty: Death (November 8, 1994)

Willie Jerome "Fly" Manning (born June 12, 1968) is on death row at Mississippi State Penitentiary, USA, with two death sentences for a conviction of double murder (Steckler-Miller murders). He was previously also convicted and sentenced to death for an unrelated double murder (Jimmerson-Jordan murders), but the State Supreme Court overturned this verdict and ordered a new trial. The charges against him for the Jimmerson-Jordan murders were then dropped, and the Death Penalty Information Center listed him as a 2015 death row exoneree for this case.

== Steckler-Miller murders: background and trial ==
Jon Steckler, 19, and Tiffany Miller, 22, were two students at Mississippi State University in Starkville. Jon Stephen Steckler was a sophomore majoring in forest resources. He was an athlete who played high school football for Cathedral High School and a practicing Catholic who served on the mission field in Mexico. He was also an outdoorsman and hunter.[8] Pamela Tiffany Miller was a third-year sophomore (having taken a year off) from Madison, Mississippi, studying nursing.[9]

On December 11, 1992, at 2:15 a.m., a motorist found Steckler shot in the back of the head and left for dead by the side of a road just outside Starkville, having been run over by Miller's car, a Toyota MR2. When law enforcement officers arrived, they found Miller's body in nearby woods. She had been shot twice, in the forehead and mouth. The evidence suggested that she had been sexually assaulted. Steckler died shortly afterward.

In the morning, Miller's car was found double-parked at an apartment complex in the vicinity of her trailer. A woman had seen the car parked outside the apartments at 1 a.m. (A witness told law enforcement that after midnight on the night of the murders, she heard a man yelling from the direction of Miller’s trailer. Two witnesses said they heard what sounded like a white man yelling, followed by two gunshots.) Miller's missing ring was found between her car and her trailer.

Law enforcement made slow progress with their investigation, which included a theory that the murders were linked to theft from a car outside Steckler’s university fraternity. On the morning of the murders, one of Steckler's fraternity brothers, John Wise, found his car had been burglarized. Prosecutors said the two students had interrupted the burglary. The two students were, according to prosecutors, forced into Miller's car from the street in front of Steckler's fraternity house.

Manning’s cousin was a suspect, but implicated two other men, passing a lie detector test when doing so. Both these men were excluded as suspects (Manning’s cousin was later to shift the blame to Manning).

Months elapsed before Manning became the main suspect. According to the sheriff, Manning fell under suspicion when a silver huggie, identified as being from the car theft, was found 5 miles from his home. The sheriff did not explain why this discovery made Manning a suspect.

Prosecutors said that Manning had a record of convictions for theft and other crimes and had recently been paroled: But there was no physical evidence linking Manning to the murders or the car burglary. No gun was ever discovered. Footprints from the scene of the crimes could not be matched to any shoes at Manning’s home. In his defense, Manning said that he did not commit the murders and that he was at a club on the night of the murders. Two witnesses saw him at the 2500 Club around midnight on the night of the murders; one of them remembered declining Manning’s request for a lift. Manning’s legal team argued that the narrow timeframe made it impossible that he had committed the murders over 3 miles away.

The trial of Manning included testimony that he possessed and also tried to sell items stolen from the Wise burglary. One of the items stolen was a gas station token. A very similar token was found at the scene of the killings, but it did not match Wise’s description of his missing token (such tokens were common then).

Also stolen was a black leather bomber jacket that was later recovered from Manning's girlfriend who testified at trial that Manning had given it to her. (However, Manning's post-conviction attorneys dispute the reliability of her trial testimony, saying law enforcement pressured her to cooperate e.g. by paying her $17,500 in cash). Another witness testified that she saw Manning wearing a leather jacket and possessing a gold class ring and a watch similar to Steckler's. Another stolen item was a portable CD player, which was traced by its serial number from Wise to a pawn shop in Jackson. The person who pawned it testified that he obtained it from Manning. Manning stated that the CD player he was selling was stolen by someone he did not know.

Manning's girlfriend, who testified to Manning's possession of the stolen property, also testified that Manning had been using a tree for target practice, (but the reliability of her testimony is disputed by Manning's post-conviction attorneys because of payments and threats made to her by law enforcement.) According to an F.B.I. firearms expert, slugs recovered from the tree were fired from the same gun used to kill Steckler and Miller. (However, a US Department of Justice letter in 2013 challenges this trial evidence, stating that the testimony should not have linked a specific gun to a specific bullet; and 2023 court documents include an expert report which goes further, concluding that firearm identification and toolmark analysis constitute unreliable forensic science. Two 2013 Department of Justice letters also declared hair testimony at Manning's trial invalid.)

Manning's cousin said Manning had admitted to him that he and another man, Jesse James "One-Wing" Lawrence, had committed the murders, but Lawrence was in jail in Alabama at the time, and four people would not have fitted into Miller’s two-seater sports car. This witness changed his story several times: he had earlier implicated two other men. (In 2023 this witness retracted his trial testimony against Manning, saying he had lied when the sheriff encouraged him to do so. The witness said he afterwards received a lighter sentence for the crimes he had recently committed, and also received some reward money.)

2023 affidavits reveal that another witness also lied at the trial: his testimony, that he overheard Manning explaining to another man how he disposed of the murder weapon, was false.

Manning was convicted of the murders of Steckler and Miller after a trial by 10 white and 2 Black jurors; the jury deliberated for one hour. Manning was sentenced to death on November 8, 1994, after the jury decided the crime was "heinous, atrocious, and cruel."

== Steckler-Miller murders: 2013 argument for new DNA testing, stay of execution, and subsequent developments ==
Manning claimed that he should have DNA testing using technology that was not available at the time of his trial. He pointed out that multiple fingerprints found in Miller's car matched neither him nor the two victims.

Manning said that at his trial, the prosecutor, Forrest Allgood, illegally dismissed as potential jurors African Americans who read African American magazines because these were liberal publications.

Manning also argued that witnesses against him in the Steckler-Miller murders gave conflicting testimony and multiple versions of testimony, and that some of the trial witness testimony contradicted known facts. He said that his cousin made several different statements, earlier implicating two different men, but later stating that Manning confessed that he and a second man committed the murders.

Manning's lawyers also contended that Manning's former girlfriend, a key witness, was granted a favorable plea deal on fraud charges, in addition to almost $18,000, to reward her for testifying for the prosecution, arrangements which were not fully disclosed to the trial jury. Manning's lawyers alleged that she also tried to implicate Manning when she asked him leading questions that were secretly recorded by officials and not disclosed to defense attorneys.

In a 5–4 ruling on April 25, 2013, the Mississippi Supreme Court denied his claims.

On 30 April 2013, the Mississippi Innocence Project filed a brief supporting Manning.

Manning was asking that evidence of possible rape of Miller be reexamined, together with fingernail scrapings, hairs, and fingerprint evidence. A rape kit and other physical evidence analyzed soon after the murders had tested negative for biological residue suitable for DNA testing. The Innocence Project countered that modern testing could reveal biological evidence undetected by earlier methods; DNA testing had exonerated even prisoners with seemingly strong evidence against them. Mississippians Educating for Smart Justice added that physical evidence from the murder scene (including hair from both victims' hands, scrapings from under their nails, and hair fragments from the car) would probably identify the murderer. Similarly, one of the dissenting judges, Justice James W. Kitchens, wrote: "whatever potential harm the denial seeks to avert is surely outweighed by the benefits of ensuring justice by the scientific analysis of all the trace evidence."

The Justice Department scrutinized Manning's case as part of a broader review of the FBI's analysis of scientific evidence in thousands of violent crimes in the 1980s and 1990s; this review was intended to correct errors in forensic hair examinations before 2000."

On May 3, 2013, the U.S. Department of Justice and the Federal Bureau of Investigation advised Mississippi officials that an examiner had overstated conclusions about the hair by suggesting it came from an African-American source. (Manning is African-American.) "We have determined that the microscopic hair comparison analysis testimony or laboratory report presented in this case included statements that exceeded the limits of science and were, therefore, invalid," the letter said. Mississippi Attorney General Jim Hood responded, "The Mississippi Supreme Court has held that the evidence is so overwhelming as to Manning's guilt [that] even if technologies were available to determine the source of the hair, to indicate someone other than Manning, it would not negate other evidence that shows his guilt."

Two FBI and U.S. Department of Justice letters, sent shortly before Manning's scheduled execution, addressed issues arising from FBI expert hair testimony at Manning's trial. One letter stated that an FBI examiner had misrepresented his findings about hair fibers, found in Miller's car, when he concluded that the hair came from an African American. The two victims were white, but Manning was black. This hair sample was the only physical evidence that connected Manning to the murder scene. The authorities stated, "We have determined that the microscopic hair comparison analysis testimony or laboratory report presented in this case included statements that exceeded the limits of science and were, therefore, invalid."

The third Department of Justice letter focused on ballistics testimony at the trial. A witness, Manning's former girlfriend, said she had once seen Manning firing a gun into a tree. The F.B.I. firearms expert testified that bullets found in the tree had been fired from the same gun as the bullets used in the murders. However, this testimony was later discredited. The Department of Justice letter stated: "The science regarding firearms examinations does not permit examiner testimony that a specific gun fired a specific bullet to the exclusion of all other guns in the world. The examiner could testify to that information to a reasonable degree of scientific certainty, but not absolutely. He added, "As with any process involving human judgment, claims of infallibility or impossibility of error are not supported by scientific standards."

Approximately four hours before the scheduled time of execution on May 7, 2013, the Mississippi Supreme Court ruled 8-1 to grant Manning a stay of execution. The judges gave no reason for this decision.

On July 25, 2013, the Mississippi Supreme Court reversed its earlier 5–4 ruling preventing the testing of fingerprints and DNA evidence. The new ruling, which was unanimous, gave Manning 60 days to file a brief requesting analysis of both.

In 2013 Miller's mother Pamela Cole, told a reporter that Manning's death would bring her peace but no closure. She expressed sadness about the 21 years she had spent missing her daughter.

Manning's lawyers stated, "A finding by the circuit court that Manning's conviction in the Brooksville Gardens case [Jimmerson-Jordan murders] was procured based on false testimony would also be relevant to the claims in this case (the college students) because it would show a pattern of reliance on testimony procured unfairly."

Tucker Carrington, director of the Mississippi Innocence Project, commented, "In my mind, the state had written Willie off,… Who gives a fuck about this guy? He's already condemned."

In 2019 the hair evidence from this case was submitted for mitochondrial testing; however, the lab chosen by Manning’s team and the state was unable to obtain a DNA profile, because of the age and deterioration of the samples. Manning then requested a transfer of the hair to a lab that specializes in analyzing degraded samples. The Mississippi Supreme Court denied this request in 2022, and the US Supreme Court did likewise in October 2023.

In September, 2023, Manning’s attorneys filed a petition for post-conviction relief; this introduced substantial new evidence that could invalidate much of the testimony at Manning’s trial. Instead of responding, the state filed a request for Manning’s petition to be dismissed and an execution date to be set. But the Mississippi Supreme Court agreed to consider Manning’s petition, and temporarily delayed a decision about whether to set an execution date.

In Manning’s petition for post-conviction relief, he argued that, because no physical evidence linked him to the murders or the car burglary, the state had resorted to using jailhouse informants. One such was Manning’s cousin, who testified that Manning had confessed to him that he had murdered the two students. But in an affidavit in 2023 this witness recanted his trial testimony, saying he was persuaded by the sheriff to lie in order to win leniency in his own sentencing. Afterwards he was given a lighter sentence and some reward money. He explained that until the sheriff left office, he had been too afraid of him to reveal the truth.

Similarly, Manning’s attorneys stated that his former girlfriend received $17,500 as a reward for being a witness for the state, in addition to cash, furniture and payment for bills that were given to her by law enforcement before the trial. On secret recordings she said that the sheriff accused her of hiding the gun used in the murders; and that she was being threatened with prosecution when facing fines and incarceration for fraud. She said the sheriff sometimes took her out for fast food, and he told her she would not have to worry about going to jail. In a 2023 affidavit, she said she saw Manning on the day of the murders, but did not see any blood on him or his clothes; nor did she see him trying to remove blood. She stated that the sheriff told her the murders were the result of a drug deal gone wrong.

Manning’s attorneys argued that because of the pressure exerted on this witness by law enforcement to gain her cooperation, her evidence was not completely reliable. It was she who testified that Manning had practiced shooting in his yard, thus allowing the state to match bullets from the victims’ bodies with bullets from the yard. However, this bullet evidence, discounted by the Department of Justice in 2013, was again dismissed in a 2023 affidavit by a firearms expert, who confirmed that firearm identification and toolmark analysis are an unreliable form of forensic science.

Another 2023 affidavit states that another witness lied when he said he overheard Manning describing how he disposed of the gun.

Manning’s attorneys speculated that the manner of Miller’s death – shot twice at close range in the face – might indicate that she was murdered by someone she knew for personal reasons.

In a 5:4 ruling in 2024, the Mississippi Supreme Court rejected Manning’s request to take the new evidence to a circuit court. The dissenting judges argued that the Mississippi Supreme Court thereby overstepped its authority; and that Manning should be granted an evidentiary hearing.

In 2024, the American Civil Liberties Union joined the case as a friend of the court, partnering with the Innocence Project. The aim of both organizations was to appeal to the Supreme Court, and reverse the decision preventing Manning from seeking further legal action. The organizations wanted Manning to get a new trial to present previously unused evidence, which could challenge Manning's conviction.

== Jimmerson-Jordan murders: background and trial ==
On the evening of January 18, 1993, Martin Luther King Day, about five weeks after the Steckler-Miller double murder, 90-year-old Emmoline Jimmerson and her 60-year-old daughter, Albertha Jordan, were murdered during an attempted robbery at their apartment in Starkville. The victims were beaten, and their throats slashed. The coroner testified that both women were beaten on their heads and chests with an iron so severely that those wounds would have been fatal even if their throats hadn't been slashed with a kitchen knife at least ten minutes after the iron attack.

The state's key witness, Kevin Lucious (who has been serving two life sentences without parole in St. Louis, Missouri, since the mid-1990s, for murder convictions there), testified that he saw Manning enter the Jimmerson-Jordan apartment on the night of the murders. Lucious also testified that Manning told him he wouldn't have done it if he'd known they only had $12. He testified that Manning said, "it wasn't anything to kill someone, and sometimes you have to kill someone to get the respect you deserve." Manning told police he had not been at the apartment complex on MLK Day, but in addition to Lucious, five other eyewitnesses placed him there, including Herbert Ashford, who not only saw Manning in the vicinity of the apartments on MLK Day but also testified that Manning later said he should have done more violence to the victims than he did (however, according to the prosecutor Lucious was the only witness to say he heard Manning admit the crime).

Lucious was the only eyewitness to testify that he saw Manning enter the women's home. No witnesses said they saw Manning leave that apartment.

Manning alleged that Jimmerson's son, James Lee Jimmerson, committed the murders and presented evidence that Jimmerson had persuaded his girlfriend to provide a false alibi for the time of the murders. The prosecution presented other witnesses establishing that Jimmerson was, in fact, elsewhere during the murders. After a jury trial and deliberations lasting three hours and twelve minutes, Manning was convicted of the murders of Jimmerson and Jordan on July 24, 1996. The jury sentenced Manning to death.

== Jimmerson-Jordan murders: appeals leading to charges being dropped ==
In 2000, after the county court determined there had been no Batson violation, the Mississippi Supreme Court affirmed the conviction and death sentence. Manning then pursued another review by the Mississippi Supreme Court. The court in 2004 granted Manning leave "to seek post-conviction relief at an evidentiary hearing in the trial court on the issues of whether the State withheld exculpatory evidence, whether the State presented false evidence and whether Manning was denied effective assistance of counsel both at trial and on appeal," but otherwise upheld his conviction and death sentence.

Lucious formally recanted his testimony in 2011. He also filed affidavits stating that his statements given to authorities and his testimony at Manning's 1996 trial were false and coerced by authorities because he was afraid he would be charged with the murders. He said that law enforcement produced the information for him to use when testifying. He added that he had told police that someone different had confessed to the murders.

On February 12, 2015, the Mississippi Supreme Court, by a vote of 7-2, granted Manning a new trial in the Jimmerson-Jordan murders, holding that prosecutors had withheld potentially exculpatory information from the defense. The Court said when Starkville police knocked on doors at the complex, they found that the apartment where Lucious claimed to live was, in fact, vacant when the crime occurred; they also showed that neither Lucious nor his girlfriend was resident in any of the apartments canvassed. The court said police withheld this information from the district attorney's office and Manning's defense attorneys.

For the majority, Justice Randolph wrote: "[T]he State violated Manning's due-process rights by failing to provide favorable, material evidence." He added, "There is no question that defense counsel would have had the opportunity to meaningfully impeach Lucious's testimony that he lived in the apartment at the time of the crime and saw Manning enter the victims' apartment. Any attorney worth his salt would salivate at impeaching the State's key witness using evidence obtained by the Starkville Police Department."

The state of Mississippi temporarily stopped executions due to concerns raised by Manning's trial, and the subsequent dropping of charges related to the Jimmerson-Jordan murders. Two death row inmates also filed a lawsuit against the state's executional procedures, arguing that there was potential for cruel and unusual punishment which would violate their constitutional protection from such.

The charges against Manning were dropped on April 21, 2015. The Death Penalty Information Center's 2015 annual survey lists Manning as one of the six death row exonerees in 2015.
