= Perry Mason syndrome =

Social effect of television portrayals of the legal system

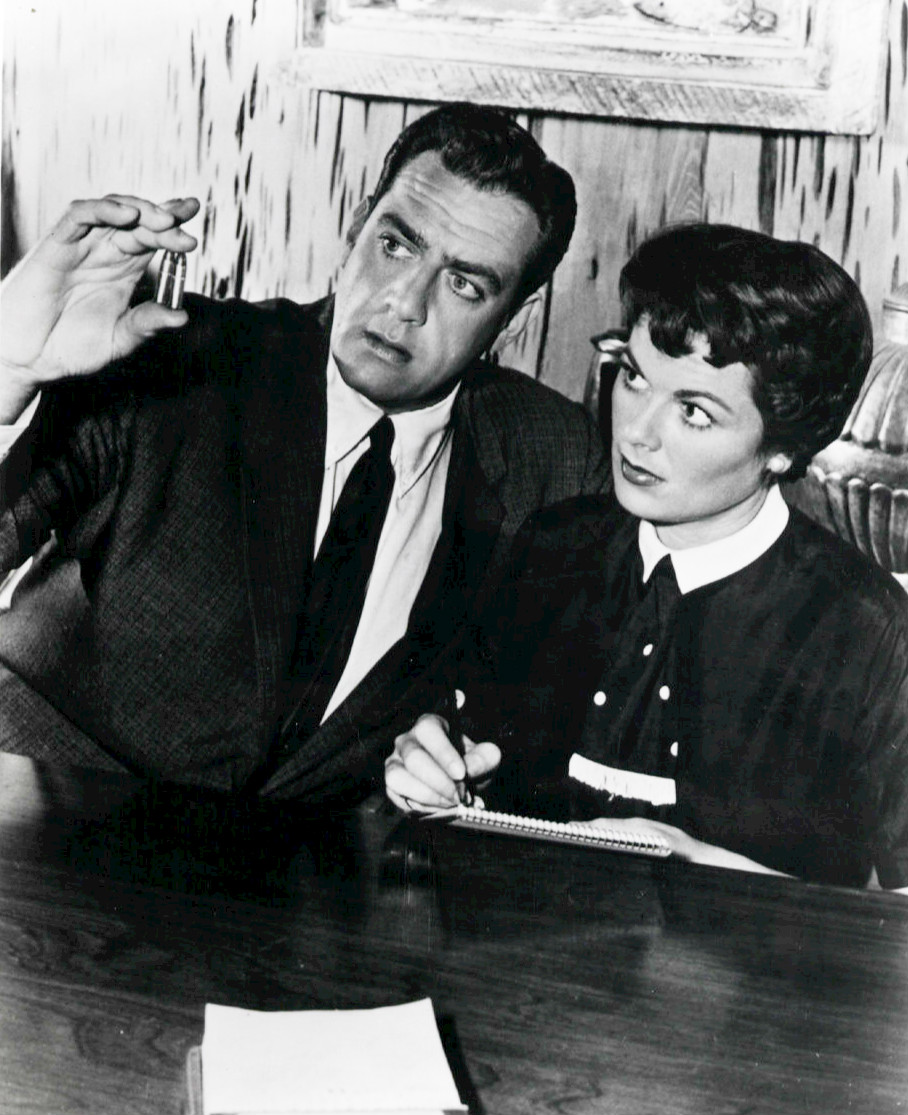
Raymond Burr and Barbara Hale as Perry Mason and Della Street from the television series Perry Mason

The Perry Mason syndrome is the manner in which the television crime drama Perry Mason (1957–1966) may have affected perceptions of the United States legal system among defendants and jurors.

== Typical Perry Mason episode ==
In a typical episode of Perry Mason, a series involving a fictional Los Angeles defense attorney which initially ran from September 1957 to May 1966, the first half of the show usually depicted several people, including Mason's client, as having strong motivations to kill the victim. After Mason's client is charged with murder, during the preliminary hearing for the trial Mason would establish his client's innocence by dramatically demonstrating the guilt of another character. The real murderer would nearly always break down and confess to the crime in the courtroom, often while on the witness stand.

== Jurors ==
The Perry Mason syndrome purports that, due to the oversimplified manner in which trial proceedings were presented on the popular crime drama Perry Mason, jurors who watched the program would enter trials with misconceptions about how the legal process works. Some argue that the Perry Mason syndrome greatly reinforced the presumption of innocence of the defendant, which may have been problematic when the defendant was guilty. Others argue that, because Perry Mason was often able to cause witnesses to confess, jurors would expect similar "Perry Mason moments" to occur in real trials as well. This shifted the burden of proof from the prosecution to the defense. In one case, a juror told the defense attorney that the jury had voted to convict the defendant because the prosecution's key witness did not confess during cross-examination.

== Defendants ==
The Perry Mason syndrome has been cited as a reason some defendants would choose to appear pro se—representing oneself in court rather than being represented by a lawyer. The simplified portrayals of trials on the television series led some defendants to underestimate the seriousness of their predicaments. Consistent viewers of the show may have also believed that they had gained an intimate understanding of the United States legal system and would be able to represent themselves better than an attorney could. This effect may have been exacerbated by the tendency for news media to oversimplify their coverage of trial proceedings.

== See also ==
- Criminal procedure in the United States
- CSI effect
