= CSI effect =

Influence of forensic science fiction on public perceptions

The CSI effect is a supposed shift in the attitudes of jurors due to the exaggerated portrayal of forensic science on television shows such as CSI: Crime Scene Investigation, which premiered in 2000. Jurors may expect large amounts of forensic evidence (such as fingerprinting and DNA analysis) in criminal trials, raising the effective standard of proof for prosecutors. The term was first reported in a 2004 USA Today article describing the effect being made on trial jurors by television programs featuring forensic science.

While this belief is widely held among American legal professionals, some studies have suggested that crime shows are unlikely to cause such an effect, although frequent CSI viewers may place a lower value on circumstantial evidence. As technology improves and becomes more prevalent throughout society, people may also develop higher expectations for the capabilities of forensic technology. The CSI effect has also re-popularized the forensic sector of the criminal justice system in the media and academia.

== Background ==
The CSI effect is named for CSI: Crime Scene Investigation, a television program which first aired in 2000. In CSI, a fictional team of "crime scene investigators" ("CSIs") solve murders in the Las Vegas metropolitan area. In each episode, the discovery of a human corpse leads to a criminal investigation by members of the team, who gather and analyze forensic evidence, question witnesses, and apprehend suspects.

The fictional show's popularity led to three spin-offs: CSI: Miami, which debuted in 2002, CSI: NY, first aired in 2004, and CSI: Cyber, which premiered in 2015. In 2021, a new spinoff aired, CSI: Vegas, which brought back William Petersen and Jorja Fox, replaying their original roles as Gil Grissom and Sara Sidle, respectively.

The CSI franchise's success resulted in the production of many similar shows. The "CSI effect" has been associated with drama and true crime television series that preceded CSI, such as American Justice, Cold Case Files, Cold Squad, Exhibit A: Secrets of Forensic Science, Forensic Files, Silent Witness, Waking the Dead; and others that followed, including Bones, Cold Case, Criminal Minds, Crossing Jordan, NCIS, Numb3rs, Wire in the Blood, and Without a Trace.

Based on the Nielsen ratings, six of the top ten most popular television shows in the United States in 2005 were crime dramas, and CSI: Crime Scene Investigation reached the number one ranking in November 2007.

Several aspects of popular crime shows have been criticized as being unrealistic. For instance, the show's fictional characters not only investigate ("process") crime scenes, but they also conduct raids, engage in suspect pursuit and arrest, interrogate suspects, and solve cases — which, in real life, falls under the responsibility of detectives and uniformed officers, not CSI personnel. Additionally, if CSIs process a crime scene, it is inappropriate for them to also be involved in the examination and testing of any evidence collected from that scene as it would compromise the impartiality of scientific evidence. In real investigations, DNA and fingerprint data are often unobtainable and, when they are available, can take several weeks or months to process, whereas television crime labs usually get results within hours.

In the first season of CSI, technicians made a plaster mold of the interior of a wound to determine the type of knife used to make the wound, which is not possible with current technology. Characters on television often use the word "match" to describe a definitive relationship between two pieces of evidence, whereas real forensic technicians tend to use terms that are less definite, which acknowledges that absolute certainty is often not possible.

Anthony E. Zuiker, creator of the CSI franchise, claimed that "all of the science is accurate" on the shows; researchers, however, have described CSI's portrayal of forensic science as "high-tech magic". Forensic scientist Thomas Mauriello estimated that 40 percent of the scientific techniques depicted on CSI do not exist. In addition to using unrealistic techniques, CSI ignores all elements of uncertainty present in real investigations, and instead portrays experimental results as absolute truth.

The notion that these inaccurate portrayals could alter the public perception of forensic evidence was dubbed the "CSI effect", a term which began to appear in mainstream media as early as 2004.

Under this effect, victims and their families – and jurors – are coming to expect instant answers from showcased techniques such as DNA analysis and fingerprinting, when actual forensic processing often takes days or weeks, with no guarantee of revealing a "smoking gun" for the prosecution's case. District attorneys state that the conviction rate in cases with little physical evidence has decreased, largely due to the influence of CSI on jury members.

By 2009 more than 250 stories about the CSI effect had appeared in newspapers and magazines, including articles in National Geographic, Scientific American, and U.S. News & World Report.

== Research findings ==
Although the CSI effect is a recent phenomenon, it has long been recognized that media portrayals of the United States legal system are capable of significantly altering public awareness, knowledge, and opinions of it.

An attorney told The New York Times in 1990 that "Any lawyer who doesn't watch L.A. Law the night before he's going to trial is a fool". A 2002 juror survey showed that viewers of the popular court show Judge Judy were greatly misinformed about the purpose of the judge within a courtroom.

Earlier programs which may have affected public perception of "the legal or investigative systems" include Perry Mason (1957–1966), Quincy, M.E. (1976–1983) and the Law & Order franchise (1990–present).

News media reports on criminal trials, extensive internet blogging, and the successes of the Innocence Project have also contributed to the increased public awareness of forensic science. CSI franchise creator Zuiker has stated that "'The CSI Effect' is, in my opinion, the most amazing thing that has ever come out of the series."

The CSI effect is described by researchers N. J. Schweiter and Michael J. Saks as a reference to the alleged phenomenon of CSI raising crime victims' and jury members' real-world expectations of forensic science, especially crime scene investigation and DNA testing. Donald E. Shelton, Young S. Kim and Gregg Barak have said it has changed the way many trials are presented today, in that prosecutors are pressured to deliver more forensic evidence in court.

In 2006, the evidence cited in support of the supposed effect was mainly anecdotes from law enforcement personnel and prosecutors, and allegedly little empirical examination of the effect had been done, and the one study published by then suggested the phenomenon may be an urban myth. A study in 2008 using psychology graduate students found no evidence of the CSI effect among heavy viewers of these types of programs.

A survey conducted by Donald E. Shelton on 1,027 potential jurors in Ann Arbor, Michigan revealed that while CSI viewers had higher expectations for scientific evidence than non-CSI viewers, in most cases, scientific evidence was not needed in order to reach a verdict.

However, more recent research suggests that these modern TV shows do have a misleading influence on public perceptions and expectations, and juror behavior.

Citing the "CSI effect", at least one researcher has suggested screening jurors for their level of influence from such TV programs.

=== Cultivation theory ===
Many studies on the "CSI effect" cite George Gerbner's cultivation theory to explain the effects that consuming television may have on viewers' perceptions of reality. Gerbner's theory claims that television is a centralized system of storytelling and causes the distortion of reality. Cultivation Theory argues that the more time people spend "living" in the television world, the more likely they are to believe social reality aligns with the "reality" portrayed on television. The theory suggests that those who watch more television are more likely to develop certain beliefs about reality based on the various depictions shown on television.

One study applied Gerbner’s Cultivation Theory to college students to see if the United States' crime shows distorted their perception of reality. Students who had heavily viewed U.S. crime shows were found to be more likely to believe various misconceptions of reality, such as how likely one is to get attacked at night in the United States.

Another study applied Gerbner's theory to a content analysis of popular crime dramas like CSI: Las Vegas, Law & Order: Special Victims Unit, Criminal Minds, and Without a Trace. Researchers found that DNA was frequently referenced within these shows, which supports with the argument that cultivation in fictional media had real-world consequences.

== Manifestations ==
=== Trials ===
The popularity of forensic crime television shows supposedly gives rise to many misconceptions about the nature of forensic science and investigation procedures among jury members. The CSI effect is hypothesized to affect verdicts in two main ways:

- First, that jurors expect more forensic evidence than is available or necessary, resulting in a higher rate of acquittal when such evidence is absent; and
- Second, that jurors have greater confidence in forensic and particularly DNA evidence than is warranted, resulting in a higher rate of conviction when such evidence is present.

While these and other effects may be caused by crime shows, the most commonly reported effect is that jurors are wrongly acquitting defendants despite overwhelming evidence of guilt. In particular, prosecutors have reported feeling pressured to provide DNA evidence even when eyewitness testimony is available.

In fact, in a study of 444 prosecutors, 56% believed the CSI effect to almost always or always influence juries, and 81% believed the CSI effect to influence judges.

In one highly publicized incident, Los Angeles County, California District Attorney Steve Cooley blamed actor Robert Blake's acquittal on murder charges on the CSI effect. Cooley noted that the "not guilty" verdict came despite two witness accounts of Blake's guilt, and claimed that the jury members were "incredibly stupid".

By 2005, some judges and prosecutors had begun altering their trial preparations and procedures in an attempt to counter the CSI effect.

Some ask questions about crime drama television viewership during voir dire to target biased jurors.

For example, in Charles and Drake v. State (2010), the defendants were convicted of second degree murder, and during voir dire, the judge presented a question about the CSI effect. In this case, the Maryland appellate court ruled the CSI effect voir dire question inappropriate due to its biased language and use of the term "convict" without mention of acquittal.

Prosecutors have also used opening statements and closing arguments to minimize the possible impact of the CSI effect.

In Goff v. State (2009), the prosecutor asked jurors during voir dire about their ability to render a verdict without scientific evidence, and then reminded them during closing arguments about this question. In this case, the mention of the CSI effect was considered acceptable because the language used was neutral and unbiased.

Additionally, jury instructions have also been used as a means of informing jurors about the CSI effect.

In Atkins v. State (2011), the jury was instructed that scientific evidence is not necessary for a case to be valid. The court ruled that this jury instruction regarding scientific evidence was improper because the State was not held to its burden of proof.

Furthermore, prosecutors have hired expert witnesses to explain why particular forms of physical evidence are not relevant to their cases. In one Australian murder case, the defense counsel requested a judge-only trial to avoid having DNA evidence misinterpreted by a jury.

In addition to having to add questions during voir dire and making opening and closing statements, prosecutors are spending more time during the jury selection process in order to avoid choosing jury members who regularly watch crime-based television shows.

By 2006, the CSI effect had become widely accepted as reality among legal professionals, despite little empirical evidence to validate or disprove it.

A 2008 survey by researcher Monica Robbers showed that roughly 80% of all American legal professionals believed they had had decisions affected by forensic television programs.

New York University professor Tom R. Tyler argued that, from a psychological standpoint, crime shows are more likely to increase the rate of convictions than acquittals, as the shows promote a sense of justice and closure which is not attained when a jury acquits a defendant. The perceived rise in the rate of acquittals may be related to sympathy for the defendant or declining confidence in legal authorities.

A 2006 survey of U.S. university students reached a similar conclusion: the influence of CSI is unlikely to burden prosecutors, and may actually help them.

One of the largest empirical studies of the CSI effect was undertaken in 2006 by Washtenaw County Circuit Court Judge Donald Shelton and two researchers from Eastern Michigan University. They surveyed more than 1,000 jurors, and found that while juror expectations for forensic evidence had increased, there was no correlation between viewership of crime shows and tendency to convict.

One alternate explanation for the changing perception of forensic evidence is the so-called "tech effect": as technology improves and becomes more prevalent throughout society, people develop higher expectations for the capabilities of forensic technology.

Shelton described one instance in which a jury member complained because the prosecution had not dusted the lawn for fingerprints, a procedure which is impossible and had not been demonstrated on any crime show. A later study by the same authors found that frequent CSI viewers may place a lower value on circumstantial evidence, but their viewership had no influence on their evaluation of eyewitness testimony or their tendency to convict in cases with multiple types of evidence.

Many stories about the CSI effect assume that there has been an increase in acquittal rates, though this is often based entirely on anecdotal evidence.

A 2009 study of conviction statistics in eight states found that, contrary to the opinions of criminal prosecutors, the acquittal rate has decreased in the years since the debut of CSI. The outcome of any given trial is much more strongly dependent on the state in which it took place, rather than whether it occurred before or after the CSI premiere.

A 2010 study by the University of Wisconsin–Milwaukee suggests that, while there may be a correlation between crime show viewership and a perceived understanding of DNA evidence, there was no evidence that such viewership affected jury decision making. As of August 2010, no empirical evidence has demonstrated a correlation between CSI viewership and acquittal rates.

One researcher suggested that the perception of a CSI effect—and of other courtroom effects, such as Perry Mason syndrome and white coat syndrome—is caused not by the incompetence of jury members, but by a general distrust of the jury system as a whole.

=== Academia ===
The CSI effect has influenced the manner in which forensic scientists are educated and trained. In the past, those who sought to enter the field of forensics typically earned an undergraduate degree in a science, followed by a master's degree. However, the popularity of programs such as CSI has caused an increase in the demand for undergraduate courses and graduate programs in forensic science.

In 2004, the forensics programs at Florida International University and the University of California, Davis, doubled in size, reportedly as a result of the CSI effect. However, many students enter such programs with unrealistic expectations. Vocational interest in forensic science has proliferated among students in countries besides the United States, including Australia, the United Kingdom, and Germany. The increased popularity of the forensic science program at the University of Lausanne in Switzerland has also been attributed to the CSI effect.

Although the increased popularity of forensics programs means there are more applicants for jobs at crime labs, there is some concern that these courses do not adequately prepare students for real forensics work, as graduates often lack a firm grasp of basic scientific principles that would come from a science degree. Many forensics students are presented with streamlined exercises with overly clear answers, which may give them distorted perceptions of the power of forensic science. The Albuquerque Police Department has attempted to improve scientific literacy among future forensic scientists and jurors alike by developing a "Citizen CSI" course which familiarizes local citizens with the "capabilities and limitations of authentic forensic science techniques".

While forensic crime shows are often criticized for portraying technologies that do not exist, these may inspire inventors and research teams, as it is not uncommon for scientific innovations to be first portrayed in science fiction.

The popularization of forensic, criminal justice, criminology, and psychology courses in higher education may be partially due to crime-related television shows. While forensic-based shows like CSI and Bones heightened the popularity of forensic programs, Criminal Minds and Quantico have promoted psychology and criminal justice programs, respectively. One study of college students found that criminal justice majors did not base their personal decisions about their majors or careers on the media, but believed that their fellow classmates did.

=== Crimes ===
The CSI effect may also alter how crimes are committed. In 2000, the year that CSI: Crime Scene Investigation debuted, 46.9% of all rape cases in the United States were resolved by police. By 2005, the rate had fallen to 41.3%. Some investigators attributed this decline to the CSI effect, as crime shows often inadvertently explain in detail how criminals can conceal or destroy evidence. Several rape victims have reported that their assailants forced them to shower or clean themselves with bleach after their assaults.

In December 2005, Jermaine McKinney broke into a home in Trumbull County, Ohio, where he murdered two women. A fan of CSI, McKinney went to unusual lengths to remove evidence of his crime: he cleaned his hands with bleach, burned the bodies and his clothing, and attempted to dispose of the murder weapon in a lake. McKinney was eventually apprehended.

Ray Peavy, head of the Los Angeles County homicide division, commented that, in addition to teaching criminals how to conceal evidence, crime shows may even "encourage them when they see how simple it is to get away with [it] on television".

Others argue that shows like CSI are not having any educational effect on criminals. Max Houck, director of the Forensic Science Initiative at West Virginia University, said although CSI may be educating criminals, people who resort to a life of crime generally are not very intelligent to begin with.

It is also possible that crime shows have the opposite effect, if attempts to conceal evidence generate more evidence. Houck gave an example of criminals who avoided licking envelopes because of the DNA in their saliva, but left fingerprints and hair samples on adhesive tape instead.

Tammy Klein, the lead investigator on the McKinney case, said that the killings she investigates are committed by people "who for the most part are pretty stupid". Larry Pozner, former president of the National Association of Criminal Defense Lawyers, argued that because people who commit violent crimes generally do not take precautions, television forensics programs are unlikely to have any effect on their behavior.

Convicted serial rapist Jonathan Haynes forced his victims to destroy forensic evidence. He was only caught after one of his victims deliberately pulled out her own hair which was later discovered in his car, tying him to the attacks. She was inspired by watching the CSI television series.

==== Police Chief's effect ====
A lesser-known subcategory of the CSI effect is known as the Police Chief's effect. The police chief's effect suggests that crime-related television shows have educated criminals on how to avoid detection from law enforcement. Crime-related television show often show techniques criminals use to reduce the likelihood of their DNA being left behind at the crime scene, such as wearing gloves or using bleach. This effect also stems to non-DNA related evidence like strategically passing a polygraph test.

=== Police investigations ===
Law enforcement officers often receive inquiries and demands about their investigations that stem from unrealistic portrayals on television. In a 2010 survey of Canadian police officers, some were frustrated by these CSI-affected queries, though most saw them as opportunities to inform the public about real police work.

New technologies and the increased public awareness of forensic science have stimulated new interest in solving cold cases and encouraged higher accountability among police investigators.

However, the increased demand for forensic evidence can cause an unmanageable workload for forensic laboratories. Some crime labs process several thousand cases every year.

Many law enforcement agencies have insufficient storage space for the increasing amount of physical evidence they collect. In some investigations, DNA evidence is not collected simply because there is not enough space to store it properly.
