= Samuel Sommers =

American social psychologist (1976 – 2025)

Samuel R. Sommers
- Born: 1976; New York City, U.S.
- Died: March 16, 2025 (aged 49)
- Education: Williams College (B.A., 1997), University of Michigan (M.A., 1999; Ph.D., 2002)
- Known for: Work on racial stereotyping and racial prejudice
- Awards: Fellow of the Society for the Psychological Study of Social Issues since 2011, 2008 Saleem Shah Award for Early Career Excellence from the American Psychology-Law Society
- Scientific career
- Fields: Social psychology
- Workplaces: Tufts University
- Thesis: Race and juries: The effects of race-salience and racial composition on individual and group decision-making (2002)
- Website: samsommers.com

Samuel R. Sommers (1976 – March 16, 2025) was an American social psychologist and professor of psychology at Tufts University. He was known for his research on implicit racial stereotyping and color-blind racism. For example, he published multiple studies on the effects of increased racial diversity in mock juries. With Michael Norton, he also published a study in 2011 showing that, on average, white people think more racism against them exists than exists against black people. L. Jon Wertheim and Sommers wrote the book This Is Your Brain on Sports: The Science of Underdogs, the Value of Rivalry, and What We Can Learn from the T-Shirt Cannon to explore how psychological and neuroscience principles explain many phenomena in sports (Sports Psychology). Sommers died on March 16, 2025, at the age of 49.

== Honors and awards ==
Sommers had been a fellow of the Society for the Psychological Study of Social Issues since 2011. In 2009, he received the Gerald R. Gill Professor of the Year Award from Tufts. In 2008, he received the Saleem Shah Award for Early Career Excellence from the American Psychology–Law Society. Anecdotally, he was beloved among the students at Tufts, with many taking his classes just to experience his renowned teaching style.
