= Death Penalty Information Center =

US non-profit reporting on capital punishment

- Formation: 1990; 36 years ago
- Type: Non-profit organization
- Headquarters: Washington, D.C.
- Services: Information on issues concerning capital punishment
- Website: deathpenaltyinfo.org

The Death Penalty Information Center (DPI) is an American non-profit organization based in Washington, D.C., that focuses on disseminating studies and reports related to the death penalty. Founded in 1990, DPI is primarily focused on the application of capital punishment in the United States.

DPI does not take a formal position on the death penalty but is critical of how it is administered. As a result, some have referred to it as an anti-death penalty organization. According to a pro-death penalty prosecutor, DPI is "probably the single most comprehensive and authoritative internet resource on the death penalty" but "makes absolutely no effort to present any pro-death penalty views." However, the DPI's award-winning Educational Curriculum on the Death Penalty includes a discussion of commonly raised arguments both for and against the death penalty.

In June 2022, on the 50th anniversary of the U.S. Supreme Court's decision in Furman v. Georgia, DPI released its Death Penalty Census, which covers the period from 1972 to January 1, 2021. The database was the result of a years-long effort. The Death Penalty Census will be updated periodically, includes death sentences imposed in U.S. state, federal, and military courts, and includes numerous details about each case.

== Personnel and funding ==
The original executive director, Michael A. Kroll, was succeeded by Richard Dieter in 1992. Robert Dunham in March became executive in March 2015 and served until January 2023. In May 2023, Robin M. Maher took on the role.

David J. Bradford was president of the board until succeeded by George H. Kendall, who was in turn succeeded by Phoebe C. Ellsworth in 2024.

DPI has received funding from a number of American philanthropic foundations. In 2009, the organization also received funding from the European Union. DPI was ranked among the Top Criminal Justice Nonprofits by Philanthropedia.

== Reports ==
DPI releases an annual report on the death penalty, highlighting significant developments and trends and featuring the latest statistics. The center also produces in-depth reports on various issues related to the death penalty such as arbitrariness, costs, innocence, and race. In November 2018, it issued a major report on lethal-injection secrecy entitled, Behind the Curtain: Secrecy and the Death Penalty in the United States. In September 2020, it issued a new report on race and the death penalty entitled, Enduring Injustice: The Persistence of Racial Discrimination in the U.S. Death Penalty. Associated Press described the report as "a history lesson in how lynchings and executions have been used in America and how discrimination bleeds into the entire criminal justice system. It traces a line from lynchings of old—killings outside the law—where Black people were killed in an effort to assert social control during slavery and Jim Crow, and how that eventually translated into state-ordered executions."

=== Innocence List ===
In 1993, the United States House Committee on the Judiciary asked DPI for assistance in identifying the risks that innocent people might be executed. That request led to the creation of DPI's Innocence List. DPI has continued to update the list, which as of February 1, 2023, documented 190 exonerations of persons who had been wrongly convicted and sentenced to death. The list does not include individuals who are innocent of the murder, but were involved in the crime in some lesser manner, or innocent prisoners who nonetheless pled guilty or no-contest to lesser crimes they did not commit in order to ensure their release from prison.

In February 2021, DPI issued a Special Report: The Innocence Epidemic, analyzing the causes and demographics of the wrongful capital convictions and death sentences that had led to the then-185 death-row exonerations since 1973. DPI found that these wrongful capital convictions had taken place in 118 different counties across 29 different states.

Writing for the National Review in 2002, Ramesh Ponnuru criticized the list for not differentiating between a person who was found innocent of the crime they were convicted of, and someone whose convictions were overturned on a technicality, though may have still committed the offence, noting that Jay C. Smith was on the list. Smith's convictions were overturned due to prosecutorial misconduct, and he could not be tried again due to double jeopardy, though an appeals court still considered him to have committed the murders he was originally convicted of.

=== Botched executions ===
The DPI website contains a page devoted to U.S. executions that death-penalty experts have considered to have been "botched." This includes a statistical analysis by Amherst College Prof. Austin Sarat, which found 276 executions between 1890 and 2010 that Sarat deemed to be botched. His definition of "botched" was an execution that deviated from the established execution protocol in a manner that "involv[ed] unanticipated problems or delays that caused, at least arguably, unnecessary agony for the prisoner or that reflect[ed] gross incompetence of the executioner." The page features a list and brief description of botched executions in the modern U.S. death-penalty era, which included 51 examples as of March 1, 2018.

In 2008, the Supreme Court of the United States heard oral arguments in Baze v. Rees, a case challenging the three-drug cocktail used for many executions by lethal injection. The respondent's lawyer, Roy T. Englert, Jr., criticized DPI's botched executions list, on the grounds that a majority of the executions on it "did not involve the infliction of pain, but were only delayed by technical problems", such as difficulty in finding a suitable vein. However, the list also contains cases of prisoners catching on fire in electric chair executions, a prisoner moaning and banging his head against a steel pole in a gas chamber execution carried out by a drunk executioner in Mississippi in 1983, and numerous instances of coughing, spasming, groaning, and gasping during executions.

The majority and dissenting justices of the U.S. Supreme Court cited data on the DPI webpage a total of eight times—and in all three opinions—in the 2015 lethal injection case, Glossip v. Gross.
