= Gregg Barak =

American criminologist, academic, and author

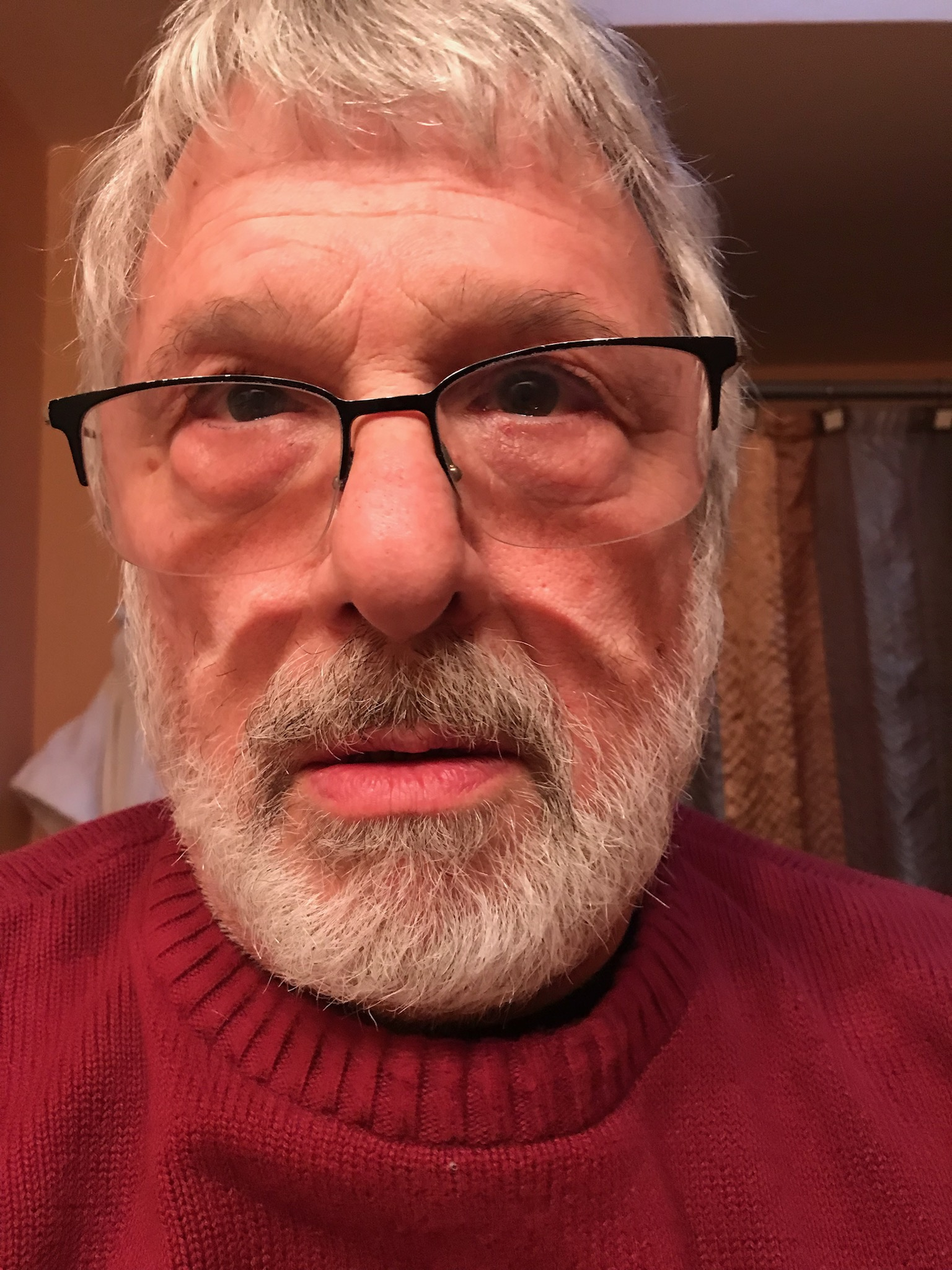
- Occupations: Criminologist, academic, and author
- Awards: Fellow, Academy of Criminal Justice Sciences; The Ronald W. Collins Distinguished Professor's Award for Scholarly/Creative Activity; Life Time Achievement Award, Critical Division of the American Society of Criminology; The Praxis Award, American Society of Criminology, Division on Critical Criminology and Social Justice; Gilbert Geis Lifetime Achievement Award, American Society of Criminology, Division of White-Collar and Corporate Crime

Academic background
- Education: University of California, Berkeley

Academic work
- Institutions: Eastern Michigan University, Alabama State University, Aurora University, University of Maryland (European Division), University of Nevada, Las Vegas, Edinboro University
- Website: http://www.greggbarak.com

Gregg Barak is an American criminologist, academic, and author. He is an emeritus professor of criminology and criminal justice at Eastern Michigan University, a former visiting distinguished professor in the College of Justice & Safety at Eastern Kentucky University, and a 2017 Fulbright Scholar in residence at the School of Law, Pontificia Universidade Catholica, Porto Alegre, Brazil. He is most known for his research in the fields of criminology and criminal justice.

Barak is the author and editor of more than 20 books, including Gimme Shelter: A Social History of Homelessness in Contemporary America, Theft of a Nation: Wall Street Looting and Federal Regulatory Colluding, Unchecked Corporate Power: Why the Crimes of Multinational Corporations are Routinized Away and What We Can Do About It, and Criminology on Trump. His latest book is Indicting the 45th President: Boss Trump, the GOP, and What We Can Do About the Threat to American Democracy.

Barak was elected Fellow of the Academy of Criminal Justice Sciences in 2003. He is the co-founder and first North American Editor of the Sage Journal of White Collar and Corporate Crime, was an Associate Editor of the journal Media, Culture, and Crime, and has served on the editorial advisory boards of more than a dozen well-reputed journals, such as Criminology, Justice Quarterly, Race, Gender, and Class, Journal of Theoretical and Philosophical Criminology, Theoretical Criminology, and Critical Criminology.

== Education ==
Barak studied at the University of California at Berkeley, and earned his bachelor's degree, Masters, and Doctorate in Criminology in 1970, 1971, and 1974, respectively.

== Career ==
Barak began his career in 1970 as a counselor in the Adolescent Treatment Program as a part of the Stiles Project of the University of California at Berkeley. Followed by that, he served there as reader in the School of Criminology, as research assistant at the Center for the Study of Law and Society, and as a teaching assistant in the School of Criminology. Between 1972 and 1973, he held brief appointments as an administrative assistant at the Oakland Community Treatment Center, and research associate at the Judicial Council of California. In the following year, he joined Edinboro University as assistant professor of Sociology and Criminal Justice, and subsequently became the Social Psychologist in the Office of Special Programs for the Edinboro Foundation. He was next appointed by the University of Nevada at Las Vegas in 1975 as assistant professor of sociology and criminal justice. After serving as a lecturer in criminology, law enforcement, and sociology beginning in 1978 for the European Division of the University of Maryland for 18 months, he returned to the U.S. where he served as a policy analyst for the Office of Justice Planning & Evaluation in Portland, Oregon.

Beginning in the fall of 1980, Barak held several administrative appointments, first at Aurora University. He was appointed there as director of the Program in Criminal Justice until 1982, and as chair in the Department of Criminal Justice until 1985. Under these roles, he designed and secured approval of the curriculum/departmental status for criminal justice. Along with these appointments, he held academic appointments as associate professor of criminal justice, and Professor of sociology and criminal justice between 1980 and 1985. He held his next appointment as professor and chair in the Department of Criminology and Criminal Justice at Alabama State University, 1985–1991, where he developed and implemented the first M.S./M.A. in criminology at an HBCU. He then moved to Ann Arbor and joined Eastern Michigan University as professor and head of the Department of Sociology, Anthropology, and Criminology. He was twice appointed there as Graduate Coordinator of Criminology and Criminal Justice in 1991, and then in 1997. As an administrator, he also served as Head Representative in the College of Arts & Sciences, and Chair of the EMU Task Force on Interdisciplinary Studies from 1993 to 1996. Shortly after returning to faculty full-time in 1997 he also served for two years as an AAUP faculty Grievance Officer.

Barak held a visiting appointment as a Distinguished Professor and Scholar at Eastern Kentucky University in 2004. Between 2007 and 2013, he served as the series editor for Issues in Crime and Justice for Rowman & Littlefield/Lexington Books. Since 2015 he has been a series editor for the Crimes of the Powerful series for Routledge. In 2017 he was a Fulbright Scholar in Residence at the School of Law, Pontificia Universidade Catholica, Porto Alegre, Brazil.

== Works ==
Barak has focused his research on criminology and criminal justice, with particular attention on social movements, social change and social justice. Over decades his ongoing research has focused on and explored many topics, such as social deviance, sociology of law, violence and nonviolence, homelessness and housing, media and crime, crime and inequality, class, race, and gender studies. His works in the fields of criminology and criminal justice have been translated into several languages such as German, Spanish, Serbian and Portuguese, including the Brazilian published book of his readings from 1986 to 2017, Crime e Justiça: Estudos De Criminologia Radical (2020).

=== Integrated criminology and state criminality ===
Barak has provided globally and historically integrated analyses of the study of crime, crime control, criminology, and criminal justice. His 2009 textbook, Criminology: An Integrated Approach— the follow-up to his 1998 textbook, Integrating Criminologies — examined criminology, along with providing a history of criminology, criminological integration, and those theories that have played a pivotal role in the legitimization of theoretical integration from the perspective of globalization. His edited anthology, Crimes by the Capitalist State: An Introduction to State Criminality (1991), focused on state crime and highlighted the criminogenic roles played by the state as agent of illegality and violence both domestically and internationally. Leo G. Barrile describes the book as based on the identification of "how the capitalist state treats the relatively powerless as threats to the social order often adjudicating them as criminal." In Class, Race, Gender and Crime: The Social Realities of Justice in America, Barak and his co-authors Paul Leighton and Allison Cotton describe how and why social relations of class, race, and gender play the most significant roles in shaping the administration of crime and justice in America. As per the viewpoint of Samantha Gwinn, this work encompasses detailed research on issues of race and crime, gender and crime, class and crime, and their intersections. Barak's 2012 book, Theft of a Nation: Wall Street Looting and Federal Regulatory Colluding, presented an examination of state-corporate crime by way of securities fraud, Wall Street's financial implosion, and its impact on the rest of the country for which perpetrators were never held criminally accountable.

Barak's most recent book, Indicting the 45th President: Boss Trump, the GOP, and What We Can Do About the Threat to American Democracy (2024), is a sequel to Criminology on Trump (2022) that was based on a criminological investigation of Donald Trump. It examined Trump's lifelong lawlessness in the contexts of the crimes of the powerful and the efforts of the United States to maintain the stability of its two conflicting political parties in which groups with competing interests and opposing visions of the world struggle for power, negotiate rule breaking, and establish criminal justice. Raymond J. Michalowski is of the view that the book offers a "unique social-psychological portrait of how the two Trumps, the real Donald Trump and his alter ego the Donald, were shaped by, and are now playing an active role in shaping the institutional and cultural framework of America." Sally Simpson states that the author's take on Trump and the Trump organization "evolves out of decades of studying the political economy of corporate and white-collar crime." Michael J. Lynch appreciates the author's effort to combine theories of personality and social structure in this fascinating and unique description of "how a deviant life course emerges, and how that life course was projected as normal and even laudable in a (social) media-dominated age." Reviewing Indicting the 45th President, Alexandria Jacobson wrote "Barak's book outlines the constitutional and democratic reforms needed to avoid an 'authoritarian or autocratic regime' now and in the future, ranging from making the House of Representatives' size more reflective of the population to reforming the outsize influence of wealthy corporations and the electoral process."

In his 2020 memoir titled, Chronicles of a Radical Criminologist: Working the Margins of Law, Power, and Justice, Barak documents his criminological journey from the 1960s to the present. He has provided a detailed account on "specific types of crime, illegitimate behavior by economically or politically powerful actors, controversies over justice system practices, and issues related to the intersection of identity, crime, and justice." In his memoir Barak also completed the reciprocal approach to integration that brought together violence and nonviolence as "two sides of the same coin" or under one book cover where he first introduced the concept in Violence and Nonviolence: Pathways to Understanding (2003). He further reiterated and finalized the last version of his "reciprocal-interactive theory of violence and nonviolence." (Note: Barak's second version, "Applying Integrated Theory: A Reciprocal Theory of Violence and Nonviolence," was published in The Essential Criminology Reader, edited by Stuart Henry and Mark M. Lanier. Boulder, CO: Westview Press, 2006, pp. 336–346.)

=== Newsmaking criminology ===
Barak first introduced the concept of Newsmaking Criminology in a 1988 Justice Quarterly article. In his edited anthology, Media, Crime, and the Social Construction of Crime: Studies in Newsmaking Criminology (1994), Barak described the roles that media plays in shaping our understandings of crime and social control, and how criminologists could intervene in that understanding. He argued that there is a critical role for criminologists to engage in by taking part in mediated representations of crime and justice in order to inform and ideally shape the narratives on crime and justice, and to help make the news consumption of crime and crime control as well as criminal justice more representative and less distorted than it has always been. In a 2022 article in Advances in Social Sciences Research Journal, Barak presented a self-ethnography about the workings of social media in relation to the monetization of the Trump book industry based on his theory and practice of newsmaking criminology. He focused on three elements— commentaries, publicity, and digital content—that are each interlinked with the monetizing of Trump, criminology, and criminologists and with the "socially mediated newsmaking" about Trump's lawlessness and his ability to get away with it.

While considering the relationship that exists between the developing political economy of mass media, intellectuals, and conceptions of crime and justice, Barak also revealed how a criminological practice of newsmaking has the potential to take advantage of the available opportunities in the production of crime and crime control news. In this vein, he became a contributing writer in 2022 for the online publications The Crime Report and Salon. and in 2024, Barak became a contributing writer for RawStory. In 2024, he wrote an articles about the 2024 presidential election and the seven dangling January 6 Election interference lawsuits.

=== Corporate criminology ===
Having incorporated his analyses from Crimes by the Capitalist State and Theft of a Nation, Barak's subsequent work contributed to criminological understanding of the ways in which nation-states rationalize, conventionalize, and routinize corporate criminality. In 2015, his edited volume, The Routledge International Handbook of the Crimes of the Powerful was published in hardback, and again in paperback in 2020. In 2017, his book, Unchecked Corporate Power: Why the Crimes of Multinational Corporations are Routinized Away and What We Can Do About It, was published. The latter book, also translated into Serbian and published in 2020, provides a critical analysis of the criminogenic outcomes of neoliberal regulation and policy from the financial sector through to the chemical industry. Raymond J. Michalowski describes the book as a "thoughtful and thought-provoking examination of contemporary corporate harms." He regarded the book as a must read for both "scholars and citizens concerned with the rising power of corporations and the declining power of average citizens." In 2021, he provided strategies to reduce the severity of corporate criminalization.

=== The crime of homelessness ===
In 1991, Barak published his second book, Gimme Shelter: A Social History of Homelessness in Contemporary America, which is an "ambitious effort to place American homelessness in a rarely considered perspective." Gary Blasi is of the view that book is aimed to evaluate homelessness as a byproduct of the significant changes which occur in national politics and global economy. Julia Schwendinger describes the book as focused on differentiating between homelessness, and the homeless. DeKeseredy regards the book as an "essential reading" for researchers and policy analysts interested in housing-related issues, and a useful "pedagogical tool".

== Personal life ==
Barak was born in 1948 in West Los Angeles where he graduated from Alexander Hamilton High School in 1966. He has been married to Charlotte Pagni, a retired academic in film and American studies, since 1976. They have one daughter, Maya Pagni Barak, an associate professor of criminology and criminal justice at the University of Michigan, Dearborn.

== Awards and honors ==
- 1990–91 – Recipient of the College of Arts and Sciences' Dean's Award for Excellence in Research and Creative Activity
- 1992 – Choice List of Outstanding Academic Books for Gimme Shelter: A Social History of Homelessness in Contemporary America
- 1997; 2000 – Who's Who Among American Teachers, 5th and 6th editions
- 1999 – Critical Criminologist of the Year, American Society of Criminology
- 2003 – Fellow, Academy of Criminal Justice Sciences
- 2006 – The Ronald W. Collins Distinguished Professor's Award for Scholarly/Creative Activity
- 2007 – Life Time Achievement Award, Critical Division of the American Society of Criminology
- 2012 – The National White Collar Crime Center/White Collar Crime Research Consortium's Outstanding Publication Award for Theft of a Nation
- 2017 – Outstanding White Collar and Corporate Crime Book of the Year for Unchecked Corporate Power, Division of WCCC at the annual meetings of the American Society of Criminology
- 2019 – The Praxis Award, American Society of Criminology, Division on Critical Criminology and Social Justice
- 2020 – Gilbert Geis Lifetime Achievement Award, Division of White-Collar and Corporate Crime, American Society of Criminology

== Bibliography ==
=== Books ===
- In Defense of Whom?: A Critique of Criminal Justice Reform (1980) ISBN 978-0870840807
- Crimes by the Capitalist State: An Introduction to State Criminality (1991) ISBN 9780791495728
- Gimme Shelter: A Social History of Homelessness in Contemporary America (1991) ISBN 9780275933203
- Varieties of Criminology: Readings from a Dynamic Discipline (1994) ISBN 9780275944858
- Media, Process, and the Social Construction of Crime: Studies in Newsmaking Criminology (1994) ISBN 9780815318552
- Representing O.J.: Murder, Criminal Justice and Mass Culture (1996) ISBN 9780911577372
- Integrating Criminologies (1998) ISBN 0-205-16557-5
- Integrative Criminology (1998) ISBN 978-1840140088
- Crime and Crime Control: A Global View (2000) ISBN 9780313306815
- Violence and Nonviolence: Pathways to Understanding (2003) ISBN 9780761926962
- Violence, Conflict, and World Order: Critical Conversations on State-sanctioned Justice (2007) ISBN 9780742547681
- Battleground: Criminal Justice-- A Two-Volume Encyclopedia (2007) ISBN 9780313340406
- Criminology: An Integrated Approach (2009) ISBN 9780742547131
- Theft of a Nation: Wall Street Looting and Federal Regulatory Colluding (2012) ISBN 9781442207806
- Unchecked Corporate Power: Why the Crimes of Multinational Corporations are Routinized Away and What We Can Do About It (2017) ISBN 9781317360520
- Class, Race, Gender, and Crime: The Social Realities of Justice in America, 5th edition (2018) ISBN 9781442268852
- The Routledge International Handbook of the Crimes of the Powerful (2020/2015) ISBN 9780367581763
- Chronicles of a Radical Criminologist: Working the Margins of Law, Power, and Justice (2020) ISBN 9781978814165
- Crime E Justica: Estudos de Criminologia Radical translated by Marília de Nardin Budó (2020) ISBN 9786559080182
- Nekontrolisana moc korporacija (2020)
- Criminology on Trump (2022) ISBN 9781000584554
- Indicting the 45th President: Boss Trump, the GOP, and What We Can Do About the Threat to American Democracy (2024)

=== Selected articles ===
- Alvesalo-Kuusi, Anne; Barak, Gregg (January 2020). "The Inaugural Issue of the Journal of White Collar and Corporate Crime". Journal of White Collar and Corporate Crime. 1 (1): 3–6. doi:10.1177/2631309X19884833. S2CID 213790263.
- Alvesalo-Kuusi, Anne; Barak, Gregg (January 2021). "Confronting Some of the Difficulties of Developing a 'Law and Order' of White Collar and Corporate Crime". Journal of White Collar and Corporate Crime. 2 (1): 3–4. doi:10.1177/2631309X20966974. S2CID 228945242.
- Barak, Gregg (June 2021). "Strategies to 'Mitigate' Corporate Criminalization". Journal of White Collar and Corporate Crime. 2 (2): 67–68. doi:10.1177/2631309X21993967. S2CID 233928685.
- Alvesalo-Kuusi, Anne; Barak, Gregg (June 2022). "A Smorgasbord of Normalizing State-Corporate Crime with a Touch of Corruption and Fraud for Good Measure". Journal of White Collar and Corporate Crime. 3 (2): 63. doi:10.1177/2631309X221085512. S2CID 247770298.
- Barak, Gregg (1 September 2022). "Debt Relief Reforms are not Enough to Alter the Relations of Inequality and Harm Reproduction: The Case of Educational Debt and the Need for Structural Reconstruction". Critical Criminology. 30 (3): 575–587. doi:10.1007/s10612-020-09542-0. PMC 7778402. PMID 33424234.
- Barak, Gregg (31 August 2022). "A People's Criminologist in An Age of Trumpian Populism: On the Praxis of Newsmaking and Monetizing". Advances in Social Sciences Research Journal. 9 (8): 494–517. doi:10.14738/assrj.98.12954. S2CID 251999187.
