= Gretchen Chapman =

Psychologist

- Occupations: Professor of Social and Decision Sciences
- Awards: American Psychological Association Distinguished Early Career Award (1998/1999)

Academic background
- Education: Bryn Mawr College (AB); University of Pennsylvania (PhD)

Academic work
- Institutions: Carnegie Mellon University

Gretchen Chapman is a cognitive psychologist known for her work on judgment and decision making in health-related contexts, such as clinical decision making and patient preferences, preventive health behavior, and vaccination. She is Professor of Social and Decision Sciences at Carnegie Mellon University. Chapman served as an Editor of the journal Psychological Science and is a Fellow of the Association for Psychological Science.

Chapman received the 1998/1999 American Psychological Association Distinguished Scientific Awards for an Early Career Contribution to Psychology in the area of applied research. Her award citation noted her achievement in producing "a steady stream of important research on behavioral decision theory and its application to health. ... [The research] increased our understanding of several basic phenomena, including underadjustment after anchoring, loss-aversion, the sunk-cost effect, and discounting in intertemporal choice. ...She has achieved new insights about the relation between imprudent behaviors, such as smoking, and the general tendency to neglect future consequences. ... Her work is responsible, careful, influential, and yes, wise."

She received the 1996 Division of Experimental Psychology, American Psychological Association award for an outstanding young investigator published in Journal of Experimental Psychology: Applied for her paper Learning lessons from sunk costs co-authored by Brian Bornstein Chapman and her colleagues received the 2000 Society for Medical Decision Making Award for Outstanding Paper by a Young Investigator., for their paper Familiarity and time preferences: Decision making about treatments for migraine headaches and Crohn's disease. Her other awards include the 2011 Distinguished Research Award from the New Jersey Psychological Association.

Chapman co-edited (with Frank Sonnenberg) "Decision Making in Health Care: Theory, Psychology, And Applications."

== Biography ==
Chapman was raised in Bethlehem, Pennsylvania. She graduated with honors from Bryn Mawr College with a Bachelors of Arts degree in Psychology in 1985. At Bryn Mawr, Chapman conducted research on Pavlovian conditioning with Dick Gonzalez. Chapman pursued her PhD in Experimental Psychology at the University of Pennsylvania where she initially worked with Robert Rescorla on studies of animal learning. Chapman shifted her research focus while engaged in research with fellow graduate student Steven Robbins, and completed her PhD in 1990, with her dissertation titled "Models of contingency judgment." She was a post-doctoral fellow in the Decision Sciences and Marketing Departments at the Wharton School at The University of Pennsylvania from 1990 to 1992, where she conducted research on anchoring with Eric J. Johnson.

Chapman was Assistant Professor of Clinical Decision Making in the Department of Medical Education, at the College of Medicine, University of Illinois at Chicago from 1992 to 1996. From 1993 to 1996 she worked as a Research Health Scientist in the Health Services Research Department of Veteran Affairs in the West Side Medical Center in Chicago. Chapman moved to Rutgers University in 1996 and remained there until 2017. She was a Distinguished Professor in the Department of Psychology and served as Chair and Director of Graduate Studies while at Rutgers. Chapman joined the faculty of Carnegie Mellon University as Professor of Social and Decision Sciences in 2017.

== Research ==
Chapman's research program examined the psychological processes underlying decision making with the aim of designing theoretically-motivated, policy-relevant interventions to facilitate healthy and prosocial behavior, such as vaccination and blood donation. Her research on decision making addresses a variety of topics including the default effect, goals and social comparisons, and allocation of scarce resources. One of main ideas in decision research is that decision makers code outcomes as gains or losses relative to a reference point. Chapman's research has shown that goals can act as a reference point, such that falling short of a goal is coded as a loss.

Chapman has studied the role of time preferences in health behavior by studying compliance with hypertension medication regimens, cholesterol-lowering medication, and annual flu vaccines. She also pursued the study of differences between time preferences for health and money, finding, for example, that agreement between the two domains is improved when decision makers view health as money. Chapman is interested in factors that drive vaccination decisions because these decisions can be a window onto a number of fundamental psychological phenomena including temporal discounting and prosocial behavior.

== Representative publications ==
- Chapman, G. B. (1996). Temporal discounting and utility for health and money. Journal of Experimental Psychology: Learning, Memory, and Cognition, 22(3), 771–791.
- Chapman, G. B., & Coups, E. J. (2006). Emotions and preventive health behavior: worry, regret, and influenza vaccination. Health Psychology, 25(1), 82–90.
- Chapman, G. B., & Johnson, E. J. (1999). Anchoring, activation, and the construction of values. Organizational Behavior and Human Decision Processes, 79(2), 115–153.
- Chapman, G. B., & Elstein, A. S. (1995). Valuing the future: Temporal discounting of health and money. Medical Decision Making, 15(4), 373–386.
- Chapman, G.B., Li, M., Vietri, J.T., Ibuka, Y., Thomas, D., Yoon, H. & Galvani, A. (2012). Using game theory to examine incentives in influenza vaccination behavior. Psychological Science, 23(9), 1008–1015.
