= Laura Kubzansky =

American psychologist

Laura D. Kubzansky is a US-based psychologist.

Kubzansky earned her doctorate in psychology from the University of Michigan in 1995, and completed her master's in public health at the Harvard T.H. Chan School of Public Health in 1997. She later joined the faculty, and held the Lee Kum Kee Professorship in social and behavioral sciences.

Kubzansky is a fellow of the American Psychological Association.
