= Saleem Shah =

Indian-American psychologist

Saleem Alam Shah (December 2, 1931, in Allahabad, India – November 25, 1992, in Baltimore, Maryland, United States) was an Indian-American psychologist known for his work regarding mental health and the law. He has been credited with helping to establish forensic psychiatry as a specialty.

== Early life and education ==
Shah was born on December 2, 1931, in Allahabad, where he received his B.A. from Allahabad University in 1952. He received part of his master's degree from Lucknow University, after which he moved to the United States, where he received his masters' (1955) and doctoral (1957) degrees in clinical psychology from Pennsylvania State University.

== Career ==
From 1955 to 1956, Shah was an intern at Spring Grove State Hospital in Catonsville, Maryland. From 1956 to 1959, he was a consulting psychologist at the Allegany County Mental Health Clinic, after which he joined the Legal Psychiatric Services Division of the District of Columbia Health Department. He remained at the D.C. Health Department until 1966, spending much of his time there as chief psychologist. In 1966, he joined the National Institute of Mental Health (NIMH), after which he became director of the Center for Studies of Crime and Delinquency, a program dedicated to researching antisocial and violent behavior. In 1987, he resigned as director of that program to focus more on research and consultation at the NIMH, where he subsequently became a senior scientist.

== Death ==
On November 25, 1992, Shah died in the Shock Trauma Unit of the University of Maryland Medical Center in Baltimore, as a result of injuries sustained in a car accident six days earlier. Shah was killed by a drunk driver. He is survived today by his six daughters and thirteen grandchildren.

== Recognition ==
Shah received the Isaac Ray Award from the American Psychiatric Association, as well as the Amicus Award from the American Academy of Psychiatry and the Law. Since 1995, the American Psychology-Law Society has awarded the Saleem Shah Early Career Award annually in his honor.
