= Alexander McClay Williams =

American teenager wrongfully executed for murder

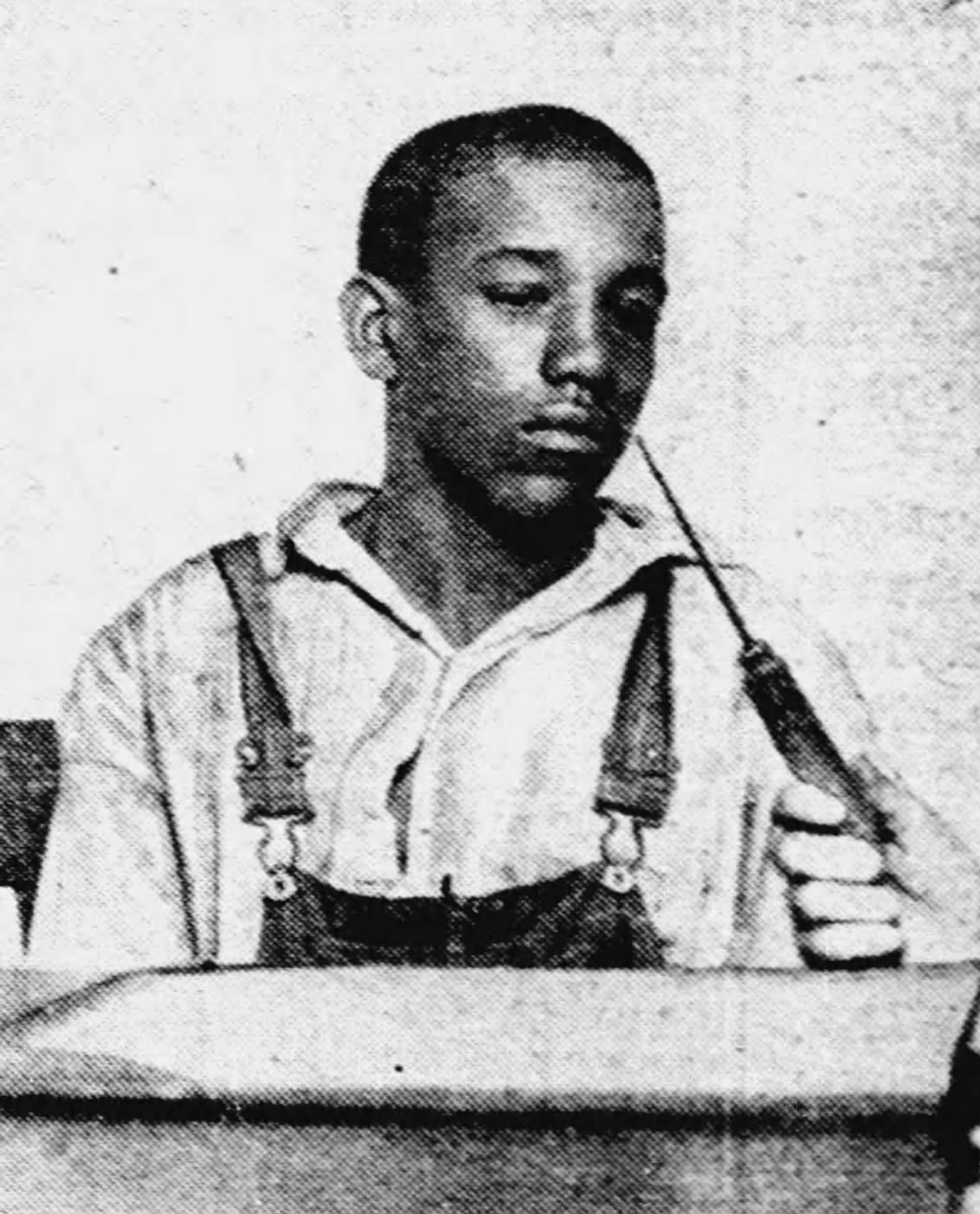
- Williams in 1930, looking at the ice pick allegedly used in the murder of Robare
- Born: July 23, 1914; Chester, Pennsylvania, U.S.
- Died: June 8, 1931 (aged 16); SCI Rockview, Pennsylvania, U.S.
- Resting place: Green Lawn Cemetery
- Known for: Being wrongfully executed
- Status: Executed by electrocution (7:06 a.m. (EST), June 8, 1931); Exonerated (June 13, 2022)
- Conviction: First degree murder (posthumously overturned)
- Penalty: Death

Details
- Date apprehended: October 1930

Alexander McClay Williams (July 23, 1914 – June 8, 1931) was an African-American teenager wrongfully convicted and executed for the 1930 murder of 33-year-old Vida Robare, a matron of the Glen Mills reform school he attended, in Pennsylvania. Williams confessed to the murder during an interrogation in which neither a parent nor an attorney was present. The Commonwealth of Pennsylvania wrongfully executed Williams for Robare's murder in 1931 at age 16, making Williams the youngest person executed in Pennsylvania in the 20th century.

Efforts to posthumously exonerate Williams began in 2015 when his attorney's grandson researched the case, generating renewed interest in its details, particularly in the fact that Williams' confession was likely coerced, that Williams' implication in the murder was likely racially motivated and inconsistent with the crime scene details, and that the real perpetrator of the murder may have been Robare's abusive ex-husband. In 2022, following a posthumous review of Williams' case, his conviction was overturned, and all charges against him were dismissed, effectively exonerating Williams.

Days before his execution, Williams's mother, Osceola Williams, visited him in jail and urged him to confess to the murder. Williams then claimed that he committed the murder with the encouragement of a 17-year-old white boy named Earl Kratzer. Kratzer was charged with murder after Osceola swore out a warrant against him. However, when Williams was called to testify at Kratzer's preliminary hearing, he recanted his allegations. The charges against Kratzer were dismissed and Williams was executed two days later.

== Early life ==
Williams was born on July 23, 1914. He had at least 10 siblings, including a sister named Susie Williams-Carter, who was his only surviving sibling by 2015; Williams-Carter was still alive in 2022 when Williams' conviction was overturned. Williams grew up in Cheyney, Pennsylvania, raised by an illiterate father, and was very physically slight, standing at 4 feet 7 inches (1.40 m) and weighing 91 pounds (41 kg). He also had learning disabilities.

At the time of the murder, Williams was enrolled in the Glen Mills Schools, a reform institution in Delaware County, Pennsylvania, after committing crimes involving arson to a barn that caused $25,000 in damage, and burglarizing a post office when he was 12 years old. Williams was at the school from July 1926 until the murder. He lived in the same cottage as Vida Robare, a matron at the Glen Mills Schools, along with 40 other black teenagers until approximately four months prior to Robare's murder. Robare ordered him relocated to a different cottage due to him repeatedly breaking rules while living there.

== Murder of Vida Robare ==
Vida Robare worked at the Glen Mills Schools alongside Fred Robare, an agriculture instructor who, according to contemporaneous news reports, was her husband. Later research by the grandson of Williams's attorney revealed that the Robares had divorced in 1921 on the grounds of Fred Robare's "extreme cruelty" and domestic abuse towards Vida.

Early reports of Robare's killing claimed that Fred, misidentified as her husband, returned home from work on October 3, 1930, and stumbled across the crime scene. He alerted police afterwards, who arrived to find Robare lying in her bed, partially clothed, with over 35 stab wounds in her chest, a fractured skull, and two broken ribs.

There was an adult's bloody hand print on a nearby wall, which was initially thought to belong to the killer. The handprint was photographed by the Pennsylvania State Police and examined by two local fingerprint experts. It was later claimed that this handprint was never mentioned again, neither at the trial or in contemporary newspaper accounts. However, this appears to be false. Contemporary newspaper accounts state that in his confession, Williams had said the bloody handprint was left by Vida Robare. Williams also said that after the murder, he had washed his clothes and returned to his assigned task on a cinder pile.

Fred was reportedly busy with a group of boys in the fields surrounding the school at the time of the murder.

== Investigation and confessions ==
Early in the investigation, police posited that the murderer found Robare in bed reading a novel when he attempted to rape her and, upon failing, stabbed her with an ice pick and beat her with an unknown blunt instrument, therefore causing the skull and rib fractures. Delaware County authorities first questioned inmates at the reform institution where Robare and her husband worked.

Three days after the murder, authorities claimed that they had evidence linking Alexander Williams to Robare's murder. They then announced that Williams had confessed to Robare's murder. Authorities alleged that Williams confessed to fatally stabbing Robare with an ice pick in spite of Robare futilely offering him money to stop stabbing her. Initially, authorities claimed that Williams' motive was revenge against Fred Robare for an unknown reason; authorities also posited that Williams murdered Vida Robare because she caught him in the act of stealing a box of shoe polish from her house. However, days later, the confession was amended to reflect that Williams allegedly murdered Robare because she fought against a rape attempt. Overall, Williams was interrogated five times, all without a parent or attorney present, and signed three confessions. No eyewitnesses or direct evidence connected Williams to the crime.

Williams was moved to a secure, private location to discourage mob violence following his confession. Soon after Williams' confession changed, District Attorney William McCarter announced his intentions to charge Williams with first degree murder.

== Trial and execution ==
At his trial, which took place in early January 1931, Williams was represented by William Ridley, the first black lawyer admitted to the Bar of Delaware County. Ridley was only paid $10 to both investigate the evidence and defend Williams, and he had 10 weeks to build his defense alone, without help from any other counsel. Williams also faced an all-white jury at trial consisting of nine men and three women.

Williams did not take the stand at his trial, and rather than proving his innocence, his defense attorney focused on attempting to convince the jury to recommend mercy and sentence Williams to life imprisonment instead of the death penalty. Williams' attorneys argued for mercy on the basis of his young age, but Judge Fronefield instructed the jury to reject his defense's age plea. At the conclusion of his one-day trial, the jury deliberated for four hours before finding Williams guilty of first degree murder. He was sentenced to death. After the judge handed down the death sentence, Williams shouted in court that he had been promised he would not be executed if he confessed.

Williams did not appeal his verdict or death sentence, but he did submit an application before the state pardon and paroles board for a commutation. In mid-April 1931, Governor Gifford Pinchot initially scheduled Williams' execution to take place on May 11, but due to a member of the board being terminally ill and unable to participate in the hearing for Williams' application, Governor Pinchot granted Williams respite, delaying the execution until the board could convene to hear Williams' plea.

Shortly before the execution, Williams' attorney made a plea on the basis of Williams allegedly being a "psychopathic inferior," evidence which was supposedly withheld from the jury during the trial but could have had an impact on the jury's decision had they known. The plea resulted in a temporary delay of Williams' execution so a commission could investigate Williams' mental state and release a report. After assessing Williams' claims for two weeks, the board refused to intervene in his death sentence.

Days before his execution, Williams's mother, Osceola Williams, visited him in jail and urged him to confess to the murder. At this, Williams confessed to the murder, but said he had been encouraged to commit the crime by a 17-year-old white boy named Earl Kratzer. He said he had committed the murder on his own and that Kratzer had fled during the attack, but also that Kratzer had goaded him into committing the crime in the first place. Kratzer was arrested and charged with murder after Osceola swore out a warrant against him. When Williams was called to testify at Kratzer's preliminary hearing on June 6, 1931, he said he lied when he accused Kratzer. The charges against Kratzer were dismissed.

On June 8, 1931, Williams was executed in Pennsylvania's electric chair. Reporters stated that Williams was emotional, visibly shaking, and reliant on the assistance of a deputy during his walk to the death chamber, and that his voice choked with emotion as he attempted to pray with the prison chaplain. He was placed in the chair at 7:01 a.m. and pronounced dead five minutes later, after one shock. Williams became the youngest person the Commonwealth of Pennsylvania ever executed.

Relatives claimed his body for burial in an unmarked grave at Green Lawn Cemetery in Chester, Pennsylvania. After a GoFundMe crowdfunding effort to raise money, Williams had a headstone installed 87 years later, in 2018, for $850 USD. The headstone is engraved with text reading, "Executed for a crime he did not commit. Justice deferred is justice denied." Dr. Samuel Lemon, Williams's only surviving sibling Susie Williams-Carter, and several other surviving relatives attended the headstone's dedication ceremony on September 29, 2018.

== Posthumous exoneration ==
=== Early exoneration efforts ===
Dr. Samuel Lemon, a college professor and the great-grandson of William Ridley, began researching the case decades after Williams's execution. By 2015, his research led him to conclude that not only was Williams likely not guilty of Robare's murder, but Fred Robare was the more likely culprit. Lemon's research revealed that Vida Robare had been granted a divorce from Fred Robare on the grounds of "extreme cruelty" and abusive behavior. Additionally, Fred Robare was the last person to see Vida Robare alive and the first to allegedly discover her body, and Dr. Lemon posited that the high number of stab wounds indicated that Vida Robare's murder was motivated by impassioned anger. Dr. Lemon stated in a 2017 interview that "the kid was positively railroaded." He also consulted with Vida Robare's surviving family members, and they indicated that they did not believe Williams was the murderer.

Delaware County's Chief Detective, Oliver Smith, declared the day after the murder that "[t]his crime was committed by a full grown and strong man. The woman was unmistakably athletic and could have fought off a boy." Two days after Smith's statement, Williams delivered his confession, which deviated from and failed to account for many of the crime scene's details. That said, Williams did later make a second confession which did account for these details.

Still, Williams was named on Robare's death certificate as her murderer days before he was even formally arrested for her murder. Prosecutors claimed that two fingerprint experts examined the hand print, but the experts were never identified or mentioned at Williams's trial. Lemon concluded that Williams's confession was coerced, stating, "This guilty verdict was decided before the case even began." Lemon also concluded that authorities' immediate framing of Williams as the killer was likely due to a "racially charged" atmosphere, remarking, "[Williams] happened to be convenient. This is not an isolated case. People understand this is not ancient history."

In May 2017, at the request of Williams family attorney Robert C. Keller, Delaware County Court officials partially expunged Williams's conviction, which allowed the case to be reintroduced to the Delaware County Court system, where it was assigned a new case number. The expungement of Williams's conviction was a historic first, as it was the first time a person convicted of a capital crime had their record expunged in Delaware County history. Afterwards, Lemon requested retention of the trial record, citing that "[his] goal is to get this before the Pennsylvania Supreme Court and have the conviction vacated. The evidence is all there." He also stated that he did not want a pardon for Williams, as a pardon would have been a gesture of forgiveness yet "still an admission of guilt."

=== Posthumous overturning ===
In 2022, Keller and Lemon presented their research on the Williams case to Delaware County District Attorney Jack Stollsteimer. Stollsteimer was receptive and, alongside Keller, arranged for a hearing before Pennsylvania Court of Common Pleas Judge Kevin Kelly, which took place on June 13, 2022.

At the hearing, Keller and Lemon presented the evidence they had compiled of Williams's possible innocence. That same day, following the hearing, Judge Kelly granted a motion to overturn Williams' conviction and death sentence. Judge Kelly granted Williams a new trial after finding that Williams's conviction followed "numerous fundamental due process violations." Stollsteimer subsequently filed a motion to nolle prosequi, signaling his unwillingness to pursue further action against Williams; a spokesperson for the District Attorney's office explained in a statement that the nolle prosequi motion was "an acknowledgement that the charges against [Williams] should never have been brought." The nolle prosequi motion thereby dismissed all charges and effectively exonerated Williams.

In a separate statement, Stollsteimer said, "Sadly, we cannot undo the past. We cannot rewrite history to erase the egregious wrongs of our forebearers. However, when, as here, justice can be served by publicly acknowledging such a wrong, we must seize that opportunity."

Williams' surviving sister, Susie Williams-Carter, told the media, "I am happy. I am happy. There's no way they can bring him back, but let his name be cleared of all that. He did not do it."

== See also ==
- George Stinney
- List of wrongful convictions in the United States
- Overturned convictions in the United States
- Capital punishment debate in the United States
- Wrongful execution
