= Capital punishment in Pennsylvania =

Capital punishment is a legal punishment in Pennsylvania. Despite remaining a legal penalty, there have been no executions in Pennsylvania since 1999, and only three since 1976 (all occurring in the 1990s, during the governorship of Tom Ridge). In February 2015, Governor Tom Wolf announced a formal moratorium on executions that is still in effect as of 2025, with incumbent Governor Josh Shapiro continuing Wolf's moratorium. However, capital crimes are still prosecuted and death warrants are still issued.

== History ==
Prior to 1913, hanging was the common method of execution. In 1834, Pennsylvania became the first state in the union to eradicate public hangings. For the following decades, each county throughout the state was in charge of carrying out private hangings within their jails. 1915 saw the first use of the electric chair, two years after it was approved by the Pennsylvania General Assembly in 1913. The delay was due to the time needed to finish the Western Penitentiary in Centre County, now the State Correctional Institution – Rockview. From 1915 to 1962, 350 people were executed by electric chair. Most of these defendants were men, but two of them were women.

A total of 1,043 people have been executed in Pennsylvania since 1693. As of 2002 this was the third-highest of any other state or commonwealth in the United States, after New York (1,130) and Virginia (1,361). Since 1978, there have been nearly 25,000 homicides throughout the state of Pennsylvania, where 408 of these homicides ended in defendants being put on death row which amounts to 1.6 death sentences for every 100 homicides.

The former governor of Pennsylvania, Robert Casey, signed a bill in 1990 that changed the method of execution from electrocution to lethal injection. The last inmate executed by the electric chair was Elmo Lee Smith, who was put to death on April 2, 1962, for the 1959 murder and rape of a 16-year-old girl.

Pennsylvania has carried out one wrongful execution. In 2022, the conviction was posthumously vacated for Alexander McClay Williams, a 16-year-old black boy who was executed in 1931 for the murder of a white woman. A review of the case determined Williams was likely innocent and that the actual killer was the victim's abusive ex-husband. In addition, it was found that Williams's confession had been coerced, his implication in the murder was racially motivated, and the theory of the crime was inconsistent with the crime scene details.

=== 2015 Moratorium ===
In 2015, the state of Pennsylvania spent about $46 million annually on the death penalty to maintain the prisoners housed on death row, as well as carry out any executions. The average price to house and take care of a death row inmate per year was about $42,000. With concerns over the cost of the death penalty growing, governor Tom Wolf requested a cost-benefit analysis. In February 2015, Wolf announced a moratorium on executions that is still in effect as of March 2026. Capital crimes are still prosecuted and death warrants are still executed. Wolf stated, "In no way does this mean sympathy for those guilty on death row." In justifying the moratorium, Wolf asserted as concerns that the system claims innocent lives, is not a deterrent to crime, is racially biased, costs a lot of money, and disregards mental illness in the US. There remains a lot of unanswered questions about the efficacy of capital punishment as a deterrent to crime as well as questions as to cost. Drugs used in lethal injection can cost upwards of $5,750 per dose.

== Death row ==
The execution chamber of the Commonwealth of Pennsylvania is on the grounds of SCI Rockview. As of 2024 male death row inmates are housed at SCI Phoenix and SCI Somerset.

Previously death row inmates were held at SCI Greene, which housed most men in this category. As of 2015, 80% of all Pennsylvania death row inmates were held at Greene. At some point all SCI Greene death row inmates were moved to Phoenix. While there are no female capital case inmates, any female death row inmates would be housed at SCI Muncy. Prior to its closure, SCI Graterford housed male death row inmates.

Pennsylvania has only executed three inmates since 1976. The first was Keith Zettlemoyer in May 1995, followed by Leon Moser in August 1995 and Gary M. Heidnik in July of 1999, all three during the term of Governor Tom Ridge. In all three cases, the individuals dropped their right to appeal. This makes Pennsylvania one of the least-active states to retain the death penalty and one of the states with the highest number of housed death row inmates. As of August 2024, 96 people were on Pennsylvania's death row, all of whom are male. Of the inmates on death row, 74% have been there for more than 10 years. Some inmates who were facing death row have received re-trials or different sentencing strategies due to the 2015 moratorium. In 2000, Joseph Daniel Miller came within a day of execution after dropping his appeals, but changed his mind just 30 hours before he was scheduled to be executed.

== Legal process ==
The death penalty is only applied when a defendant is guilty of first degree murder. A separate hearing must take place for this defendant to be put on death row. If one of the ten aggravating circumstances listed in Pennsylvania law and none of the eight mitigating factors are found to be involved in the case, the verdict is death for the defendant.

When the prosecution seeks the death penalty, the sentence is decided by the jury and must be unanimous. If during the penalty phase the case results in a hung jury, a life sentence is issued even if only one juror opposed death. There is no provision for a retrial).

A death sentence has to be affirmed by the state Supreme Court. If it is affirmed, the governor of the state must sign off on the death warrant within thirty days. This is a signed document known as the 'Governor's Warrant'. Should the governor fail signing the death warrant within thirty days, then the Secretary of the Pennsylvania Department of Corrections shall sign the death warrant within thirty days. State constitutional provisions require a unanimous vote of the Pardons Board to permanently change any life or death sentence before the governor can commute it.

== Capital crimes ==
First-degree murder can be punished by death in Pennsylvania if it involves one or more of the following aggravating factors:

1. The victim was a firefighter, peace officer, public servant concerned with official detention, a judge of any court in the unified judicial system, the Attorney General of Pennsylvania, deputy Attorney General, District Attorney, Assistant District Attorney, member of the General Assembly, Governor, Lieutenant Governor, Auditor General, State Treasurer, state law enforcement official, local law enforcement official, Federal law enforcement official or person employed to assist or assisting any law enforcement official in the performance of his duties, who was killed in the performance of his duties or as a result of his official position.
2. The defendant paid or was paid by another person or had contracted to pay or be paid by another person or had conspired to pay or be paid by another person for the killing of the victim.
3. The victim was being held by the defendant for ransom or reward, or as a shield or hostage.
4. The death of the victim occurred while the defendant was engaged in the hijacking of a motor-vehicle or aircraft.
5. The victim was a prosecution witness to a murder or other felony committed by the defendant and was killed for the purpose of preventing his testimony against the defendant in any grand jury or criminal proceeding involving such offenses.
6. The defendant committed a killing while in the perpetration of a felony.
7. In the commission of the offense the defendant knowingly created a grave risk of death to another person in addition to the victim of the offense.
8. The offense was committed by means of torture.
9. The defendant has a significant history of felony convictions involving the use or threat of violence to the person.
10. The defendant has been convicted of another Federal or State offense, committed either before or at the time of the offense at issue, for which a sentence of life imprisonment or death was imposable or the defendant was undergoing a sentence of life imprisonment for any reason at the time of the commission of the offense.
11. The defendant has been convicted of another murder committed in any jurisdiction and committed either before or at the time of the offense at issue.
12. The defendant has been convicted of voluntary manslaughter, or a substantially equivalent crime in any other jurisdiction committed either before or at the time of the offense at issue.
13. The defendant committed the killing or was an accomplice in the killing, while in the perpetration of a drug-related felony.
14. At the time of the killing, the victim was or had been involved, associated or in competition with the defendant in the sale, manufacture, distribution or delivery of any controlled substance or counterfeit controlled substance, and the defendant committed the killing or was an accomplice to the killing, and the killing resulted from or was related to that association, involvement or competition to promote the defendant's activities in selling, manufacturing, distributing or delivering controlled substances or counterfeit controlled substances.
15. At the time of the killing, the victim was or had been a nongovernmental informant or had otherwise provided any investigative, law enforcement or police agency with information concerning criminal activity and the defendant committed the killing or was an accomplice to the killing, and the killing was in retaliation for the victim's activities as a nongovernmental informant or in providing information concerning criminal activity to an investigative, law enforcement or police agency.
16. The victim was a child under 12 years of age. (Child murder)
17. At the time of the killing, the victim was in her third trimester of pregnancy or the defendant had knowledge of the victim's pregnancy.
18. At the time of the killing the defendant was subject to a court order restricting in any way the defendant's behavior toward the victim or any other order of a court of common pleas or of the minor judiciary designed in whole or in part to protect the victim from the defendant.

== See also ==
- List of people executed in Pennsylvania
- List of death row inmates in the United States § Pennsylvania
- Crime in Pennsylvania
- Law of Pennsylvania
