= Elmo Lee Smith =

American convicted murderer executed in Pennsylvania

- Born: March 21, 1921; Richmond, Virginia, U.S.
- Died: April 2, 1962 (aged 41); SCI Rockview, Pennsylvania, U.S.
- Known for: Last person to be executed by electrocution in Pennsylvania
- Status: Executed by electrocution
- Conviction: First degree murder
- Penalty: Death

Elmo Lee Smith (March 21, 1921 – April 2, 1962) was an American convicted murderer executed in Pennsylvania for the 1959 rape and murder of a teenage girl. On December 28, 1959, in Philadelphia, Pennsylvania, Smith abducted 16-year-old Maryann Mitchell while she was returning home from the cinema, and he raped and killed her thereafter. Mitchell's body was located in a muddy gully in Lafayette Hill three days after her disappearance. The investigations eventually led to the arrest of Smith, who was charged with the kidnapping, rape and murder of Mitchell. Smith was convicted of first degree murder by a jury, sentenced to death, and executed by the electric chair on April 2, 1962. Smith was the last person to be executed by electrocution in the Commonwealth of Pennsylvania.

== Background ==
Smith was born on March 21, 1921, in Richmond, Virginia. When Smith was four years old, his family relocated to Pennsylvania and he grew up in Chester County. After reaching adulthood, Smith enlisted in the United States Army and served in World War II. Smith was married in July 1943, and his first and only child, a son, was born in 1947. However, the couple divorced, and Smith's ex-wife was granted custody of their son.

In January 1946, Smith was involved in serial burglaries and assaults on women (some of whom he had attempted to rape). Smith was arrested and convicted of these crimes, and sentenced to ten to 20 years' imprisonment. During his sentencing in 1948, a judge admonished Smith for his "Jekyll and Hyde" personality and stated he should never be released, and a psychiatrist described him to have "sexual tendencies which led to caveman tactics". Smith served ten years before he was paroled and released, but he would return to prison a second time for parole violation (also related to a sexual crime). Subsequently, Smith was paroled a second time on October 1, 1958. After his second release on parole, Smith worked as a handyman in a local motel in Upper Merion Township from October 1, 1959, to January 4, 1960, before he was arrested for murder that same month.

== Murder of Maryann Mitchell ==
On December 28, 1959, in Philadelphia, Pennsylvania, 16-year-old Maryann Theresa Mitchell (July 14, 1943 – December 28, 1959), an 11th grade student of Cecilian Academy from Manayunk, was kidnapped by Smith, who ultimately raped and murdered her.

On that fateful day, Mitchell left home to watch a movie with her friend. After they completed the movie, Mitchell and her friend left the cinema and went their separate ways. While she was on her way home, Mitchell encountered Smith, who spotted her alone in a corner street while he was driving a car he stole from a Norristown couple. Smith used a bumper jack to bludgeon the girl on the head and forced her into the car. While he drove to a secluded spot, Smith undressed Mitchell and threw out her clothes from the car. After he parked the car, Smith raped Mitchell and also battered her multiple times in her head.

After the brutal attack, Smith disposed of the body in a muddy gully in LaFayette Hill. He used a lipstick to draw the symbols TB and 101 on her body. After leaving Mitchell for dead, Smith drove back home to Bridgeport, where he threw away his underwear. Meanwhile, Mitchell was reported missing by her parents the next day after her murder, due to her not returning home after the movies. Two days after Mitchell's death, John Bridenback, a maintenance crewman with the Montgomery County Highway Department, discovered the body of Mitchell, and an autopsy report confirmed that she was raped and her death was due to the head injuries inflicted by Smith.

Smith was arrested on January 7, 1960, more than a week after the murder. Smith confessed to his involvement in Mitchell's murder, for which he was charged. Apart from the murder charge, Smith was also charged with burglary, larceny and arson for stealing the car he used to facilitate the abduction-killing of Mitchell.

== Trial of Elmo Smith ==
Before his trial was set to occur, Smith filed a motion to change his trial venue from Montgomery County to a different county, due to extensive pre-trial publicity surrounding his case, which might affect his right to a fair and impartial trial. On June 15, 1960, Smith's application was granted and the trial location was moved out of Montgomery County. On August 22, 1960, the trial of Elmo Smith began before an Adams County jury and Judge W. C. Sheely was appointed as the presiding judge of the trial.

On September 1, 1960, the jury found Smith guilty of first-degree murder.

On September 3, 1960, Smith was sentenced to death upon the jury's unanimous recommendation for capital punishment.

On February 23, 1961, Smith was formally sentenced to death via the electric chair by Judge W. C. Sheely.

== Execution ==
On September 27, 1961, Smith's direct appeal against his death sentence was set for hearing before the Pennsylvania Supreme Court. On January 2, 1962, the Pennsylvania Supreme Court rejected Smith's appeal.

On February 8, 1962, Governor David L. Lawrence announced that Smith's death warrant was signed, and his death sentence was scheduled to be carried out on April 2, 1962.

On March 22, 1962, as a final recourse to evade the death penalty, Smith petitioned for clemency to the Pennsylvania Board of Pardons, seeking to commute the death sentence to life imprisonment, on the grounds that the Commonwealth was partly to blame, given that the authorities prematurely released Smith from prison despite knowing that he was a "sexual psychopath".

On March 26, 1962, the Pennsylvania Board of Pardons denied clemency for Smith.

On the eve of his execution, Smith, who was incarcerated on death row at the SCI Graterford, was transferred to the SCI Rockview, where the state's execution chamber was located.

On April 2, 1962, Elmo Smith was put to death by the electric chair at the SCI Rockview. Smith did not provide a final statement, but he ate a final meal of potatoes, lima beans, peach short cake and coffee prior to his execution.

== Aftermath ==
During his lifetime and after his execution, Smith was long believed to have been the real killer in the 1947 unsolved murder-rape of five-year-old Carol Ann Thompson in Montgomery County, Pennsylvania, given the fact that the murder of Thompson shared multiple similarities with the 1959 murder of Maryann Mitchell. Despite the evidence implicating Smith in Thompson's murder, no charges had been filed. The father of Thompson had reportedly attended Smith's murder trial for the Mitchell case and nearing Smith's execution, he appealed to Smith to reveal the truth before his execution and hoped to know if Smith really killed his daughter.

In 2012, American writer Donna Persico wrote a book titled Murdered Innocence, which covered the murder of Maryann Mitchell and the trial of Elmo Smith.

Smith was the last convict to be executed in the Commonwealth of Pennsylvania before the 1972 landmark case of Furman v. Georgia, which temporarily suspended capital punishment nationwide. The ban lasted for four years before the 1976 landmark ruling of Gregg v. Georgia, which revived capital punishment in the United States. Pennsylvania would reinstate capital punishment in 1978, and on May 2, 1995, 33 years after Smith was put to death, Keith Zettlemoyer was executed for the 1980 murder of a co-worker, marking the Commonwealth's first execution in 33 years. Additionally, Smith was the last person to be executed by the electric chair in Pennsylvania. In 1971, nine years after Smith's execution, the electric chair was dismantled, and in 1990, Governor Bob Casey Sr. signed a new law to permit lethal injection as Pennsylvania's sole method of execution, thus ending the use of the electric chair in the Commonwealth.

SCI Rockview, the prison where Smith's execution was carried out, was officially closed in September 2025 after Governor Josh Shapiro approved a proposal to cease its operations, in light of the decreasing inmate population and the need to save taxpayers' money. By 2026, all the remaining inmates at the prison were transferred out to other prisons in the Commonwealth.

== See also ==
- Capital punishment in Pennsylvania
- List of people executed in Pennsylvania
- List of people executed by electrocution
- List of people executed in the United States in 1962

Preceded by Frank McCoy	Executions carried out in Pennsylvania	Succeeded by Keith Zettlemoyer
