= National Registry of Exonerations =

Database of wrongful convictions in the US

- Formation: May 2012; 14 years ago
- Founder: Rob Warden; Samuel R. Gross
- Type: Research organization / database project
- Legal status: Academic research project
- Region served: United States
- Website: exonerationregistry.org

The National Registry of Exonerations is a project of the University of Michigan Law School, Michigan State University College of Law and the University of California Irvine Newkirk Center for Science and Society. The Registry was co-founded in 2012 with the Center on Wrongful Convictions at Northwestern University School of Law to provide detailed information about known exonerations in the United States since 1989. As of June 28, 2025, the Registry lists 3,698 known exonerations in the United States since 1989, 463 pre-1989, and 46 cases in a separate database, The Groups Registry, which contains cases involving mass vacations of convictions tied to the official misconduct of a government actor. The National Registry does not include more than 1,800 defendants cleared in 15 large-scale police scandals that came to light between 1989 and March 7, 2017, in which officers systematically framed innocent defendants.

The co-founders of the Registry are Rob Warden, then the executive director of Northwestern's Center on Wrongful Convictions, and Michigan Law professor Samuel R. Gross, who with Michael Shaffer wrote the report Exonerations in the United States, 1989–2012. According to Gross, "these cases merely point to a much larger number of tragedies that we do not know about." The registry and report includes cases of defendants convicted of crimes that never occurred, cases involving false confessions, and cases involving innocent defendants who pleaded guilty. The new report reveals many more exonerations than previously found.

The National Registry of Exonerations is the largest and most detailed compilation of exoneration data ever made.

== Data ==
Exonerations may be browsed and sorted by name of the exonerated individual, state, county, year convicted, age of the exonerated individual at the time of conviction, race of the exonerated individual, year exonerated, crime for which falsely convicted, whether DNA evidence was involved in the exoneration, and factors that contributed to the wrongful conviction. Race is the focus of a March 7, 2017, report that says,

African Americans are only 13% of the American population but ... 47% of the 1,900 exonerations listed in the National Registry of Exonerations (as of October 2016), and the great majority of more than 1,800 additional innocent defendants who were framed and convicted of crimes in 15 large-scale police scandals and later cleared in "group exonerations." ... The main reason for this racial disproportion in convictions of innocent drug defendants is that police enforce drug laws more vigorously against African Americans than against members of the white majority, despite strong evidence that both groups use drugs at equivalent rates. African Americans are more frequently stopped, searched, arrested, and convicted—including in cases in which they are innocent. The extreme form of this practice is systematic racial profiling in drug-law enforcement.

The registry also indicates whether a co-defendant or a person who might have been charged as a codefendant gave a confession that also implicated the exoneree and whether the false conviction case involved "shaken baby syndrome" or child sex abuse hysteria. The exoneration also includes a glossary of terms.

For all exonerations listed in the original 873 cases identified, the most common were perjury or false accusation (51%), mistaken witness identification (43%), official misconduct (i.e., by police, prosecutors, or judges), false or misleading forensic evidence (24%) and false confession (16%). Inadequate legal defense also played a role in some cases of wrongful conviction.

The exoneration data indicates that factors contributing to false convictions vary by crime. The largest contributor to false convictions for homicide is perjury, often by someone who claims to have witnessed the crime or participated in it, and false confessions. In rape cases, the largest contributor is eyewitness misidentification, frequently by white victims who misidentify black defendants. Witness mistakes are also present in the majority of false convictions for robbery, which has few exonerations because DNA evidence is rarely available in such cases. The report also indicates that child sex abuse exonerations are almost all because it is later determined that no crime occurred.

By March 2017 the total on the Registry exceeded 2,000. A 2017 report highlighted that although African Americans form 13% of the American population, they accounted for 47% of the exonerations on the Registry. To which must be added most of the 1,800 additional innocent defendants who were framed and convicted of crimes in 15 large-scale police scandals and later cleared in "group exonerations".

== See also ==
- Actual innocence
- Eyewitness memory
- Innocence Project
- List of exonerated death row inmates
- List of wrongful convictions in the United States
- Misinformation effect
- Mistaken identity (disambiguation)
