= Wrongful execution =

Execution of a convict who is actually innocent

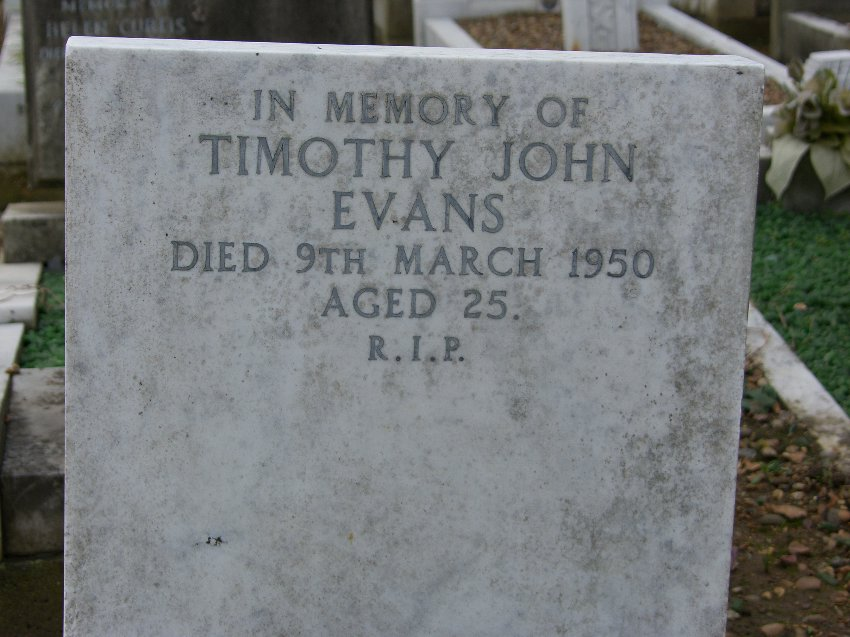
The grave of Timothy Evans, who was wrongfully executed for the murder of his daughter

Wrongful execution is a miscarriage of justice occurring when an innocent person is put to death by capital punishment. Opponents of capital punishment often cite cases of wrongful execution as arguments, while proponents argue that innocence concerns the credibility of the justice system as a whole and does not solely undermine the use of the death penalty.

A variety of individuals are claimed to have been innocent victims of the death penalty. Newly available DNA evidence has allowed the exoneration and release of more than 20 death-row inmates since 1992 in the United States, but DNA evidence is available in only a fraction of capital cases. At least 190 people who were sentenced to death in the United States have been exonerated and released since 1973, with official misconduct and perjury/false accusation the leading causes of their wrongful convictions.

Judicial murder is a type of wrongful execution.

== Specific examples ==
=== Australia ===
Colin Campbell Ross was hanged in Melbourne in 1922 for the rape and murder of 12-year-old Alma Tirtschke the previous year in what became known as the Gun Alley Murder. The case was re-examined in the 1990s using modern techniques and Ross was eventually pardoned in 2008, by which time capital punishment in Australia had been abolished in all jurisdictions.

=== China ===
Wei Qing'an (Chinese: 魏清安, born 1961) was a Chinese citizen who was executed for the rape of Kun Liu, a woman who had disappeared. The execution was carried out on 3 May 1984 by the Intermediate People's Court. In the next month, Tian Yuxiu (田玉修) was arrested and admitted that he had committed the rape. Three years later, Wei was officially declared innocent.

Teng Xingshan (Chinese: 滕兴善) was a Chinese citizen who was executed for supposedly having raped, robbed and murdered Shi Xiaorong (石小荣), a woman who had disappeared. An old man found a dismembered body, and incompetent police forensics claimed to have matched the body to the photo of the missing Shi Xiaorong. The execution was carried out on 28 January 1989 by the Huaihua Intermediate People's Court. In 1993, the previously missing woman returned to the village, saying she had been kidnapped and taken to Shandong. The absolute innocence of the wrongfully executed Teng was not admitted until 2006.

Nie Shubin (Chinese: 聂树斌, born 1974) was a Chinese citizen who was executed for the rape and murder of Kang Juhua (康菊花), a woman in her thirties. The execution was carried out on 27 April 1995 by the Shijiazhuang Intermediate People's Court. In 2005, ten years after the execution, Wang Shujin (王书金; Wáng Shūjīn) admitted to the police that he had committed the murder. Nie was declared innocent in 2017 and Wang was executed on 2 February 2021 by lethal injection.

Qoγsiletu or Huugjilt (Mongolian: Qoγsiletu, Chinese: 呼格吉勒图, born 1977) was an Inner Mongolian who was executed for the rape and murder of a young girl on 10 June 1996. On 5 December 2006, ten years after the execution, Zhao Zhihong (Chinese: 赵志红) wrote the Petition of my Death Penalty admitting he had committed the crime. Huugjilt was posthumously exonerated and Zhao Zhihong was sentenced to death in 2015.

=== England and Wales ===
In 1660, in a variety of events known as the Campden Wonder, an Englishman named William Harrison disappeared after going on a walk, near the village of Charingworth, in Gloucestershire. Some of his clothing was found slashed and bloody on the side of a local road. Investigators interrogated Harrison's servant, John Perry, who eventually confessed that his mother and his brother had killed Harrison for money. Perry, his mother, and his brother were hanged. Two years later, Harrison reappeared, telling a tale that he had been abducted by three horsemen and sold into slavery in the Ottoman Empire. Though his tale was implausible, he indubitably had not been murdered by the Perry family.

In the UK, reviews prompted by the Criminal Cases Review Commission have resulted in one pardon and three exonerations for people that were executed between 1950 and 1953 (when the execution rate in England and Wales averaged 17 per year), with compensation being paid. Timothy Evans was granted a posthumous free pardon in 1966. Mahmood Hussein Mattan was convicted in 1952 and was the last person to be hanged in Cardiff, Wales, but had his conviction quashed in 1998. George Kelly was hanged at Liverpool in 1950, but had his conviction quashed by the Court of Appeal in June 2003. Derek Bentley had his conviction quashed in 1998 with the appeal trial judge, Lord Bingham, noting that the original trial judge, Lord Goddard, had denied the defendant "the fair trial which is the birthright of every British citizen."

Timothy Evans was executed in March 1950 for the murder of his wife and infant daughter. An official inquiry conducted 16 years later determined that it was Evans' fellow tenant, serial killer John Christie, who was responsible for the murders. Christie also admitted to the murder of Evans' wife, following a conviction for murdering five other women and his own wife. Christie, who was himself executed in 1953, may have murdered other women, judging by evidence found in his possession at the time of his arrest, but it was never pursued by the police. Evans was posthumously pardoned in 1966 after the inquiry concluded that Christie had also murdered Evans' daughter. The case was a major factor leading to the abolition of capital punishment in the United Kingdom.

George Kelly was executed in March 1950 for the 1949 murder of the manager of the Cameo Cinema in Liverpool, UK and his assistant during a robbery that went wrong. This case became known as the Cameo Murder. Kelly's conviction was overturned in 2003. Another man, Donald Johnson, had confessed to the crime but the police bungled Johnson's case and had not divulged his confession at Kelly's trial.

Somali-born Mahmood Hussein Mattan was executed in 1952 for the murder of Lily Volpert. In 1998 the Court of Appeal decided that the original case was, in the words of Lord Justice Rose, "demonstrably flawed". The family were awarded £725,000 compensation, to be shared equally among Mattan's wife and three children. The compensation was the first award to a family for a person wrongfully hanged.

Derek Bentley was a learning disabled young man who was executed in 1953. He was convicted of the murder of a police officer during an attempted robbery, despite the fact that his accomplice had fired the gun while Bentley was already under arrest at the time of the shooting. Christopher Craig, the 16-year-old who fired the fatal shot, could not be executed as he was under 18. Craig served 10 years in prison before he was released.

=== Taiwan ===
Chiang Kuo-ching (Chiang is the family name; Chinese: 江國慶, born 1975) was a Republic of China Air Force serviceman who was executed by a military tribunal on 13 August 1997 for the rape and murder of a five-year-old girl. On 28 January 2011, over 13 years after the execution, Hsu Jung-chou (許榮洲), who had a history of sexual abuse, admitted to the prosecutor that he had been responsible for the crime. In September 2011, Chiang was posthumously acquitted by a military court, who found his original confession had been obtained by torture. Ma Ying-jeou, the Republic of China's president, apologised to Chiang's family. Later that year, Hsu was sentenced to 18 years in prison for the murder. However, in 2013, his conviction was overturned by the Taiwan High Court. It was determined that Hsu's confessions were inconsistent with the autopsy reports. In addition, he was intellectually disabled. Hsu had the mind of between that of a 9-year-old and a 12-year-old and could not write. His initial confession had been written down by a member of the military who refused to testify. The ruling stated that Hsu left a bloody palm print at the scene of the crime, but no other evidence linked him to the crime.

=== Ireland ===
Sir Edward Crosbie, 5th Baronet was wrongfully executed in Carlow in 1798. Accused of being a United Irishman, his innocence was later proven.

Maolra Seoighe was executed in Galway in 1882 for the Maamtrasna Murders. Crispin Blunt, Tory Parliamentary Under-Secretary of State for Prisons and Youth Justice, stated that Seoighe was "probably an innocent man". On 4 April 2018 Michael D. Higgins, the President of Ireland, issued a pardon on the advice of the government of Ireland saying "Maolra Seoighe was wrongly convicted of murder and was hanged for a crime that he did not commit." Seoighe had not received a fair trial. Although he could only speak Irish, the case was heard in English without any translation service. He was posthumously pardoned in 2018.

Harry Gleeson was executed in Ireland in April 1941 for the murder of Moll McCarthy in County Tipperary in November 1940. The Gardaí withheld crucial evidence and fabricated other evidence against Gleeson. In 2015, he was posthumously pardoned.

=== United States ===
University of Michigan law professor Samuel Gross led a team of experts in the law and in statistics that estimated the likely number of unjust convictions. The study, published in Proceedings of the National Academy of Sciences determined that at least 4.1% of people on death row would be legally exonerated if they were kept on death row indefinitely. However, this statistic would include those who otherwise would've had their death sentences reduced on appeal prior to their exonerations.

Statistics likely understate the actual problem of wrongful convictions because once an execution has occurred there is often insufficient motivation and finance to keep a case open, and it becomes unlikely at that point that the miscarriage of justice will ever be exposed. For example, in the case of Joseph Roger O'Dell III, executed in Virginia in 1997 for a rape and murder, a prosecuting attorney argued in court in 1998 that if posthumous DNA results exonerated O'Dell, "it would be shouted from the rooftops that ... Virginia executed an innocent man." The state prevailed, and the evidence was destroyed.

In 1736, Andrew, a slave belonging to Richard Bradford, and a married white indentured servant named Elizabeth Williams were convicted of adultery for having consensual sex in Caroline County. Unsatisfied with the verdict, some successfully lobbied for Andrew to be prosecuted for rape. Andrew was convicted of rape, sentenced to death, and executed by hanging on June 6, 1736. The incident was later seen as a miscarriage of justice since it was undisputed that the two had engaged in consensual sex. Going forward, the county stopped punishing black men when white women gave birth to mixed race children. However, four white women would be flogged in such cases.

Celia was a slave who was executed in Missouri in 1855 for the murder of her master, whom she killed in self-defense after he tried to rape her. Celia's master had been raping her on a regular basis for years, after he tried to rape her again. The judge denied the defense's jury instruction to acquit based on the sexual assault and denied the jury any ability to acquit on grounds for self-defense or to find Celia justified to ward off her master's sexual advances with force or at all. He also prevented the defense from arguing that Celia had not intended to kill her master. Celia was posthumously pardoned in 2024.

Chief Leschi was executed for the murders of two Washington Territorial Volunteers on February 19, 1858. That Leschi killed them was not in dispute, but supporters argued that he could not be charged with murder in the death of a combatant in a recognized war. Leschi was informally exonerated in a non-legally binding ruling in 2004 by a Historical Court of Inquiry of Washington State.

We-Chank-Wash-ta-don-pee, or Chaska, was a Native American of the Dakota who was executed in a mass hanging near Mankato, Minnesota on December 26, 1862, in the wake of the Dakota War of 1862, despite the fact that President Abraham Lincoln had commuted his death sentence days earlier.

Chipita Rodriguez was hanged in San Patricio County, Texas in 1863 for murdering a horse trader, and 122 years later, the Texas Legislature passed a resolution exonerating her.

William Jackson Marion was hanged in Beatrice, Nebraska on March 25, 1887 for the murder of John Cameron. In 1891, Marion's uncle located Cameron alive in Kansas. Marion was posthumously pardoned in 1987.

Thomas and Meeks Griffin were executed in South Carolina in 1915 for the murder of a man involved in an interracial affair two years previously. They were posthumously pardoned in 2009. It is thought that they were arrested and charged because they were viewed as wealthy enough to hire competent legal counsel and get an acquittal.

In October 1930, a 16-year-old African-American boy named Alexander McClay Williams was accused of the attempted rape and murder of Vida Robare, a white matron of his reform school. Williams confessed to the murder. Overall, authorities subjected Williams to five interrogations without his parents or an attorney present. He signed three different confessions, the last of which was altered to match the crime scene details and the story that Williams had attempted to rape Robare, as Williams's first confession had not matched the crime scene details or the allegations authorities made against him. At his trial, Williams faced an all-white jury while being represented by his county's first black attorney. After a judge formally sentenced him to death, Williams yelled out that he had been promised that he would be spared execution if he confessed. His appellate attorneys unsuccessfully tried to stop his execution by arguing that he was a "psychopathic inferior," and he was executed on June 8, 1931, still at the age of 16, becoming the youngest person executed in Pennsylvania in the 20th century. In 2015, a descendant of his attorney, Samuel Lemon, began researching Williams's case and concluded that the most likely culprit behind Robare's murder was her ex-husband, who had supposedly discovered her body. Robare had obtained a divorce against her ex-husband on the grounds of "extreme cruelty" due to domestic abuse. Lemon posited that Williams's wrongful prosecution stemmed largely from his race and the "racially charged" atmosphere present at the time. In 2022, following a posthumous review of Williams's case, his conviction was overturned, and all charges against him were dismissed, effectively exonerating him.

Joe Arridy, an intellectually disabled Lebanese-American man, was sentenced to death for the rape and murder of a 15-year-old schoolgirl from Pueblo, Colorado. He confessed to murdering the girl and assaulting her sister. Due to the sensational nature of the crime precautions were taken to keep him from being lynched. After multiple stays, he was executed on January 6, 1939, in the Colorado gas chamber in the state penitentiary in Canon City, Colorado. In 2011, Arridy was posthumously pardoned by Colorado Governor Bill Ritter, a former district attorney, after research had shown that Arridy was very likely not in Pueblo when the crime happened and had been coerced into confessing. Among other things, Arridy had an IQ of 46, equal to the mental age of a 6-year-old. Codefendant Frank Aguilar had been executed in 1937. Prior to his execution, Aguilar said he had acted alone and was coerced into initially implicating Arridy. Arridy's posthumous pardon in 2011 was the first such pardon in Colorado history.

George Stinney, a 14-year old African-American boy, was electrocuted in South Carolina on June 16, 1944, for the murder of 11-year-old Betty June Binnicker and 8-year-old Mary Emma Thames. The arrest occurred on March 23, 1944, in Alcolu, inside of Clarendon County, South Carolina. Supposedly, the two girls rode their bikes past Stinney's house where they asked him and his sister about a certain type of flower; after this encounter, the girls went missing and were found dead in a ditch the following morning. After an hour of interrogation by the officers, a deputy stated that Stinney confessed to the murder. He was the youngest person executed in the United States. More than 70 years later, a judge threw out the conviction, calling it a "great injustice."

=== Russia ===
Aleksandr Kravchenko was executed in 1983 for the 1978 murder of 9-year-old Yelena Zakotnova in Shakhty, a coal-mining town near Rostov-on-Don. Kravchenko had previously served time in prison for the brutal rape and murder of a 10-year-old girl when he was 17, but witnesses said he was not at the scene of Zakotnova's murder at the time. Under police pressure the witnesses altered their statements and Kravchenko was executed. Years later Andrei Chikatilo, a serial killer nicknamed "the Red Ripper" and "the Butcher of Rostov", was convicted with Zakotnova murder, among others, and sentenced to death. Prior to his execution in 1994, however, Chikatilo's conviction for Zakotnova's murder was overturned by the Supreme Court of Russia. It is now unclear who committed the murder.

== Exonerations and pardons ==
Kirk Bloodsworth was the first American to be freed from death row as a result of exoneration by DNA evidence. Bloodsworth was a Marine before he became a waterman on the Eastern Shore of Maryland. At the age of 22, he was wrongly convicted of the murder of a nine-year-old girl; she had been sexually assaulted, strangled, and beaten with a rock. An anonymous call to the police claimed that the witness had seen Bloodsworth with the girl that day, and he matched up with the description from the police sketch. Five witnesses claiming that they saw Bloodsworth with the victim, as well as a statement in his testimony where he claimed that he had "done something terrible that day" that would affect his relationship with his wife, did not help his case. No physical evidence connected Bloodsworth to the crime, but he was still convicted of rape and murder which led to him receiving a death sentence. In 1992, DNA from the crime scene was tested against Bloodsworth's and found that he could not have been the killer. After serving nine years in prison, he was released in June 1993.

Ray Krone is the 100th American to have been sentenced to death and then later exonerated. Krone was convicted of the murder of Kim Ancona, thirty-six year old victim in Phoenix, Arizona. Ancona had been found nude, fatally stabbed. The physical evidence that the police had to rely on was bite marks on Ancona's breasts and neck. After Ancona had told a friend that Krone, a regular customer, was going to help her close the bar the previous night, the police brought him in to make a Styrofoam impression of his teeth. After comparing the teeth marks, Krone was arrested for the murder, kidnapping, and sexual assault of Ancona on 31 December 1991. At the trial in 1992, Krone pled innocence, but the teeth mark comparison led the jury to find him guilty and he was sentenced to death as well as a consecutive twenty-one year term of imprisonment. Krone's family also believed that he was innocent, which led them to spend over $300,000 in order to fight for his freedom.

The Death Penalty Information Center has identified at least 190 former death-row prisoners in the United States who have been exonerated since 1973. DPIC reported in February 2021 that exonerated death-row prisoners had been wrongly convicted and sentenced to death in 29 different states and in 118 different counties. The leading causes of these wrongful capital convictions were official misconduct by police, prosecutors, or other government officials and perjury or false accusation. Underscoring the often intentional nature of wrongful capital convictions, more than half of all exonerations involved both official misconduct and perjury or false accusation, and at least one or the other was present in nearly 83% of the cases.

== See also ==
- Outline of capital punishment
- Capital punishment debate
- Cold case
- Extrajudicial killing
- List of exonerated death row inmates
- List of United States death row inmates
- List of wrongful convictions in the United States
- Miscarriage of justice
- Cameron Todd Willingham
- Show trial
