= List of people executed in Pennsylvania =

The following is a list of people executed by the U.S. state of Pennsylvania.

Since the reinstatement of the death penalty by the U.S. Supreme Court in 1976, 3 men, all convicted of murder, have been executed by the Commonwealth of Pennsylvania. All were executed by lethal injection, and in all cases, they waived their appeals and asked that the execution be carried out.

A total of 1,043 people have been executed in Pennsylvania since 1693, the third highest of any other state or commonwealth in the Union, after New York (1,130) and Virginia (1,361).

Until 1915, hanging was the common method of execution. 1915 saw the first use of the electric chair, even though it was approved by the Pennsylvania General Assembly in 1913. The delay was due to the time needed to finish the Western Penitentiary in Centre County, now the State Correctional Institution – Rockview. On November 29, 1990, Governor Casey changed the form of execution to lethal injection. Elmo Lee Smith was the last criminal executed by electrocution in Pennsylvania; his execution was carried out in 1962 for the 1959 murder-rape of a teenage girl.

== After 1976 ==
No.	Name	Race	Age	Sex	Date of execution	County	Method	Victim(s)	Governor
1	Keith William Zettlemoyer	White	39	M	May 2, 1995	Dauphin	Lethal injection	Charles DeVetsco	Tom Ridge
2	Leon Jerome Moser	White	52	M	August 16, 1995	Montgomery	Lethal injection	Linda Moser, Donna Moser, and Joanne Moser	Tom Ridge
3	Gary Michael Heidnik	White	55	M	July 6, 1999	Philadelphia	Lethal injection	Deborah Dudley and Sandra Lindsay	Tom Ridge

== Demographics ==
Race
White	3	100%
Age
30–39	1	33%
40–49	0	0%
50–59	2	66%
Sex
Male	3	100%
Date of execution
1976–1979	0	0%
1980–1989	0	0%
1990–1999	3	100%
2000–2009	0	0%
2010–2019	0	0%
2020–2029	0	0%
Method
Lethal injection	3	100%
Governor (Party)
Milton Shapp (D)	0	0%
Dick Thornburgh (R)	0	0%
Bob Casey Sr. (D)	0	0%
Tom Ridge (R)	3	100%
Mark Schweiker (R)	0	0%
Ed Rendell (D)	0	0%
Tom Corbett (R)	0	0%
Tom Wolf (D)	0	0%
Josh Shapiro (D)	0	0%
Total	3	100%

== See also ==
- Capital punishment in Pennsylvania
- Capital punishment in the United States
