= Samuel R. Gross =

American lawyer and professor (born 1946)

Samuel Raymond Gross (born 1946) is an American lawyer and the Thomas and Mabel Long professor of law at the University of Michigan Law School. Gross is best known for his work in false convictions and exonerations, notably the Larry Griffin death penalty case.

Gross is the editor of the National Registry of Exonerations project.

Samuel Gross has been leading a team of lawyers in statistics and in law, which determined the likely number of unjust convictions of prisoners on death row. The study determined that at least 4% of people on death row were and are innocent. The research was peer reviewed with the Proceedings of the National Academy of Sciences which later published it. Gross has stated that he firmly believes some innocent people have been executed.

== Background ==
Before coming to Michigan Law, Gross served as an attorney for the United Farm Workers Union in California and the Wounded Knee Legal Defense Committee in Nebraska and South Dakota. He came to Michigan Law from the faculty at Stanford Law School and was previously a visiting professor at Yale Law School. He graduated from Columbia College in 1968 and earned a J.D. from the University of California, Berkeley in 1973. Gross argued Lockhart v. McCree before the United States Supreme Court.

== Career ==
Gross led a team that investigated exonerations in the United States from 1989 to 2003. They determined that during that 15-year period, 340 exonerations were given, of which 144 were cleared by DNA evidence. 80% of the exonerated individuals had been imprisoned for at least 5 years.

== See also ==
- List of wrongful convictions in the United States
- Wrongful executions in the United States
