= Glen Mills Schools =

Defunct juvenile reform school in Pennsylvania

Coordinates: 39.9185°N 75.4998°W

Glen Mills Schools logo

The Glen Mills Schools was a reform school for juvenile delinquents in the United States. It was located near Glen Mills in Thornbury Township, Delaware County, Pennsylvania, United States, for boys between 12 and 21 years of age. Founded by the Quakers in 1826, it was the oldest surviving school of its type in the United States until all residents were ordered removed on March 25, 2019, by the Pennsylvania Department of Human Services. The school's licenses were subsequently revoked for not complying with the state's Human Services Code and regulations.

Previously, Glen Mills had been lauded as a "pathbreaking concept for modernizing failing reform schools in the United States". The St. Petersburg Times in 1996 called it "the country's most radical and, some say, its most effective answer yet to juvenile crime". and the New York Times praised its "culture that encourages self-discipline and a sense of mutual respect and responsibility". Juvenile courts in other states, such as California and Texas, along with various Pennsylvania jurisdictions, sent boys adjudged delinquent to Glen Mills Schools. Even troubled boys from other countries, such as Bermuda and Germany, were also sent there. Bermuda's Department of Child and Family Services, for example, sent boys to Glen Mills for more than 35 years between 1982–2017, paying almost $1.6 million to the school between 2001 and 2019. On the school's 125th Anniversary, it described itself as having "500 court-adjudicated male youth on an open residential campus, providing students with academics, vocational programs, character and leadership skill development, behavior services, athletics and recreation".

The school denied allegations of mistreatment and appealed the revocation of its licenses to the Pennsylvania DHS Bureau of Hearings and Appeals, but settled a class action lawsuit in 2023.

== History ==
The Glen Mills Schools was the oldest surviving school of its type in the United States, continuously providing services to troubled youth for almost 200 years. The institution was founded in 1826 in Philadelphia, Pennsylvania, as the Philadelphia House of Refuge. In 1892, the school relocated to its current campus in Glen Mills, Pennsylvania, and in 1911 changed its name to the present Glen Mills Schools.

=== Philosophy and leadership ===
“What sets the Glen Mills Schools apart from its peers is the emphasis on changing behavior and building skills. These are students, not inmates, attending a school, not a detention facility.”

— Glen Mills Schools (2014)

Cosimo D. "Sam" Ferrainola, who served as the director of Glen Mills from 1975-2007, said that the school's social structure is, "a system of social control borrowed directly from street gangs. [...] Which is why Glen Mills recruits gang members as students. They readily understand the power of peer pressure and the rewards of status. The big difference between a street gang and Glen Mills is that students aren't allowed to lay a hand on each other." Ferrainola was succeeded by Garry Ipock as executive director in 2007, who served in that capacity until 2012. Randy Ireson followed as executive director 2013–2019.

== Campus ==
The 750 acres (300 ha) campus is situated on an almost 1,800-acre (730 ha) property, located 20 miles (32 km) west of Philadelphia, The campus may appear "like another pricey prep school for East Coast elites", it was said, but was highly regarded for reforming some of the most extreme cases of juvenile delinquency.

For athletics, the school has the Hayes Recreation Center with indoor track, tennis and basketball courts, as well as a football stadium, baseball diamonds, and an Olympic size indoor swimming pool. The school's teams, called the "Battling Bulls", have won many championships competing in 15 varsity sports as a member of the Pennsylvania Interscholastic Athletic Association.

== Influence on juvenile delinquency treatment elsewhere ==
- In 1996 officials in Florida started plans to establish the Adam Paine Academy, modeled on Glen Mills. Community pressure led to an end of the plans in 1997.
- In Europe, the Netherlands and Germany adopted some of the Glen Mills philosophies after 1980. German psychologist Manfred Günther studied the school in 1979 and the famed German criminologist Jens Weidner developed a lot of Glen Mills' techniques (i.e. Gestalt therapy's "hot seat" and others) to use in German youth prisons like in Hameln.

== Abuse allegations and license revocation ==
In Summer, 2018, the Philadelphia Inquirer reported that a youth had been beaten by a school counselor. In February 2019, it was reported that Glen Mills Schools had been abusing their students. It was said that conditions at the school “constitute gross incompetence, negligence, misconduct in operating a facility, including mistreatment and abuse of clients, likely to constitute immediate and serious danger to the life or health of the children in care." This prompted the Pennsylvania Department of Human Services to order an emergency removal of all students from the school on March 25, 2019. On April 8, 2019, Glen Mill's licenses were revoked by the Pennsylvania Department of Human Services for not complying with the state's Human Services Code and regulations. The school has appealed the state's action.

Glen Mills School is also the subject of an ongoing investigation or law enforcement proceeding at the U.S. Department of Justice in 2019.

In January 2023 the school agreed to pay $3 million to settle a class action suit over abuse allegations.

== Notable alumni ==
- Ralph Jarvis, gridiron football player
- Aaric Murray, basketball player
- Bernard Pierce, NFL player for the Jacksonville Jaguars and Baltimore Ravens.
- Alexander McClay Williams, wrongful execution victim
