= Sandra Lindsay =

Sandra Lindsay may refer to:

- Sandra Lindsay, a victim of serial killer Gary M. Heidnik
- Sandra Lindsay, the first recipient of the COVID-19 vaccine in the United States
