= Juan Covington =

Convicted American serial killer

- 2025 Mugshot of Covington
- Born: Juan Edward Covington; March 3, 1962 (age 64); Philadelphia, Pennsylvania, U.S.
- Convictions: First degree murder (3 counts); Attempted murder (2 counts)
- Penalty: Life imprisonment

Details
- Victims: 3+
- Span of crimes: 1998–2005
- Country: United States
- State: Pennsylvania
- Date apprehended: July 12, 2005
- Imprisoned at: State Correctional Institution – Rockview, Benner Township, Pennsylvania, U.S.

Juan Edward Covington (born March 3, 1962) is an American serial killer responsible for at least five shootings in neighborhoods of Philadelphia, Pennsylvania, from 1998 to 2005, three of which were fatal. Motivated by delusions brought on from his paranoid schizophrenia, Covington was convicted and given three life terms which he is serving to this day.

== Early life ==
Covington was born on March 3, 1962, in the Logan section of Philadelphia, one of two nearly identical brothers. His childhood was reportedly normal until 1990, when his father died. After that point, Covington frequently fell into depressive moods and began taking medication, but after a few years, he suddenly declared himself "cured". In contrast to his claims, he started exhibiting strange behavior, ranging from wearing military fatigues and patrolling around his neighborhood for unseen forces to refusing to bathe or wash himself. According to his family members, at one Christmas, he kept gazing at the decorated tree because he thought it was moving. Despite this, he was considered a mostly upstanding citizen who worked as a bus driver for SEPTA for around 18 years, before switching to hauling medical waste for local hospitals. According to neighbors, Covington was a quiet, yet easily offended man, but was otherwise considered fairly normal.

== Murders ==
Covington's first known murder occurred on August 19, 1998, when he used a SIG Sauer to murder The Rev. Thomas Lee Devlin, a 49-year-old Baptist pastor whom Covington was in no way related to, although this error has been falsely reported by multiple media outlets without correction. Covington shot Devlin 13 times in Devlin's church on Old York Road.

The alleged motive for the killing was that Devlin supposedly used witchcraft to cast evil spells on him. Despite this, Covington later attended Rev. Devlin's funeral and was reportedly very upset at his death. Even though he knew the victim peripherally, he was not considered a suspect. The case was originally thought to be the result of a child custody dispute between Devlin and an ex-girlfriend although there is no record of any such custody dispute ever having taken place with the mothers of any of Devlin's multiple children.

For the next four years, no known crimes were connected to Covington. On May 20, 2003, while walking around Logan, he came across 41-year-old David Stewart. For reasons unknown, Covington pulled out a 9mm pistol and shot at him nine times, paralyzing him from the waist down. Due to this, Stewart was forced to walk on crutches. A similar incident took place on April 26, 2004, when he encountered 32-year-old William Bryant Jr. on West Ruscomb Street and proceeded to shoot him nine times. Like Stewart, Bryant survived the encounter, but was disabled and now has trouble with speech. For the latter assault, a 32-year-old social worker, Clyde A. Johnson, would be erroneously arrested and kept in detention awaiting trial, where he would remain until Covington was linked to the crimes. The murders would resume on March 7, 2005, when Covington shot and killed 36-year-old Odies Bosket, a clerk for the Revenue Department who was on route to pick up his daughter from a nursery in Logan. Another man, 37-year-old Morris Wells, was charged with the murder and would also be kept in detention until the real killer's capture.

=== Murder of Patricia McDermott, arrest and investigation ===
On the early morning of May 17, 2005, 48-year-old Patricia "Trish" McDermott, a radiographer for the Pennsylvania Hospital, was found shot to death on Market Street by a passing driver. Preliminary investigations pointed that she had been killed with a .380 pistol, but authorities struggled to determine a possible motive, as none of her money or personal possessions were stolen. After collecting CCTV footage from the surrounding buildings, detectives observed McDermott getting off the bus, followed shortly by a man wearing a baseball cap, light jacket and green pants, who seemed to be stalking her. After following her down the block, the man suddenly pulled out a gun and shot her once in the head, killing McDermott on the spot.

As they were able to discern neither the suspect's face nor a possible motive for the crime, detectives scoured the surrounding area for additional camera footage in an effort to gather potential clues. After collecting several tapes, they eventually came across a recording from a parking lot that showed the killer running across it and allowed them to map out his escape route. Even with further analysis, they were still unable to determine who he was, and because of this, the police department turned towards the FBI and the NFL Films branch for assistance, but as this produced no viable leads, they eventually resorted to releasing the footage in the hope that somebody would recognize and potentially identify the man.

The move proved to be successful, as it generated hundreds of tips, with one of them coming from an employee of a bus company who claimed the man was Juan Covington, a subcontractor at the local Pennsylvania Hospital. Upon reviewing security footage from the hospital's cameras, it was found that he had worn the exact same clothing as the man who had shot McDermott, which allowed the authorities to finally arrest him. In the subsequent interrogations, Covington gave a written statement in which he admitted full responsibility, claiming that he believed McDermott was poisoning him with X-rays, and that he decided to kill her because nobody would believe him if he said anything. To the investigators' surprise, Covington then went to admit that he had killed Devlin and Bosket, as well as shooting Stewart and Bryant. A ballistic examination concluded that the victims had been shot with the guns owned by Covington, thus confirming him as a serial killer.

== Trial and imprisonment ==
After Covington's arrest and announcement as a suspect in the serial murders, all the men previously arrested in the respective cases had their charges dropped and were subsequently released. While he openly admitted responsibility for the attacks, Covington initially refused to plead guilty, claiming that he was "the chosen One" and he had killed the three because he believed them to be devils who were trying to harm him. At trial, his attorney, A. Charles Peruto Jr., noted his client's history of mental illness and a diagnosis of paranoid schizophrenia in an effort to spare him the death penalty.

In the end, Covington pleaded guilty and was handed three life terms without parole for the murders plus two 20-to-40-years imprisonment sentences for the attempted murders. He was also ordered to undergo psychiatric counseling at State Correctional Institution – Waymart, before he was eventually transferred to State Correctional Institution – Rockview, where he remains to this day.

=== Other murders ===
Apart from his known murders, Covington is considered a suspect in at least two other crimes: the 1997 disappearance of 24-year-old Brenwanda Smith and the 2004 cold case murder of 25-year-old Ann Yuille. Smith, a SEPTA bus driver who had rebuked his romantic advances, vanished under mysterious circumstances after the pair had an argument in Hunting Park on February 18, 1997. She has not been found, and remains missing to this day. In the latter case, Yuille, a hospital worker, was found shot to death on Ninth Street and Girard Avenue in North Philadelphia on May 7, 2004. Authorities consider Covington a possible suspect because he may have encountered her while working there.

== See also ==
- List of people sentenced to more than one life imprisonment
- List of serial killers in the United States
