= Keith Zettlemoyer =

American murderer (1955–1995)

- Born: June 4, 1955; Aberdeen, Maryland, U.S.
- Died: May 2, 1995 (aged 39); SCI Rockview, Pennsylvania, U.S.
- Status: Executed by lethal injection
- Conviction: First degree murder
- Penalty: Death (April 24, 1981)

Details
- Victims: 1
- Date: October 13, 1980

Keith William Zettlemoyer (June 4, 1955 – May 2, 1995) was an American convicted murderer who was executed in Pennsylvania for the 1980 murder of his friend Charles DeVetsco. He became the first person to be executed in Pennsylvania since the United States reinstated the death penalty in 1976.

== Early life ==
Zettlemoyer was born on June 4, 1955, in Aberdeen, Maryland. He was the oldest of five children and had four sisters. In his early years, he tried to join the army but was unsuccessful. He then worked a variety of different jobs, including photographer, custodian, and maintenance worker.

== Murder ==
In the early hours of the morning on October 13, 1980, two police officers were out on patrol in Harrisburg, Pennsylvania, in an unmarked car. They heard gunfire coming from a nearby wooded area which was unlit and often used for dumping trash. As they approached the scene, they found a 1967 Ford van parked on a dirt road near some bushes. After hearing rustling noises coming from the bushes, they ordered the person making the noise to come out. Zettlemoyer emerged from the woods holding a handgun and a flashlight. He claimed he had been shooting rats, but the officers were not convinced. Zettlemoyer was ordered to drop the gun and was then secured.

One of the officers searched the area and came across the body of 29-year-old Charles DeVetsco. He had been shot a total of four times. It later emerged he had been shot twice in the van while handcuffed and was then dragged from the van to the woods where two more fatal shots were fired. The cause of death was confirmed as a massive hemorrhaging of the heart, which had been penetrated by .357 Magnum bullets.

== Trial ==
DeVetsco had worked with Zettlemoyer at a retail store and had been scheduled to testify against him in an upcoming robbery trial in Snyder County. In May 1980, Zettlemoyer and an accomplice, Kenneth Kipple, had carried out a robbery, in which they had bound a security guard at a RadioShack near Sunbury and had stolen electronic equipment worth thousands of dollars. Kipple was later caught trying to sell the equipment and had named Zettlemoyer as his partner. Zettlemoyer had then confided in DeVetsco about the heist. DeVetsco contacted the authorities and had planned to testify against him. Zettlemoyer had kidnapped DeVetsco near Selinsgrove and had driven him to Harrisburg to kill him in order to prevent his testimony.

On April 24, 1981, Zettlemoyer was convicted of first degree murder and was sentenced to death. After spending fourteen years on death row, Zettlemoyer fired his lawyers and dropped his efforts to live. He begged the courts to let him die because he claimed "brain disease" was making his life hell. Doctors reported that Zettlemoyer was suffering from post-traumatic stress disorder. Lawyers for the Pennsylvania Post-Conviction Defender Organization argued that Zettlemoyer was not mentally competent, however, three psychiatrists testified he was sane. DeVetsco's mother also argued that Zettlemoyer was mentally ill and was, therefore, not competent to be executed for the murder of her son.

== Execution ==
On February 28, 1995, Governor Tom Ridge, who had made carrying out the death penalty a campaign issue, signed his first three death warrants. One of the warrants was for Zettlemoyer, who was scheduled to be executed on May 2.

Zettlemoyer was executed by lethal injection on May 2, 1995, at State Correctional Institution – Rockview. His last meal was two cheeseburgers, french fries, chocolate pudding, and chocolate milk. He became the first person to be executed by the state of Pennsylvania since the resumption of the death penalty in 1976 and the first inmate put to death in Pennsylvania in thirty-three years. He remains the first of only three people to be executed in Pennsylvania since the resumption of the death penalty. The others were Leon Moser in August 1995 and Gary M. Heidnik in 1999.

== See also ==
- List of people executed in Pennsylvania
- List of people executed in the United States in 1995
- Volunteer (capital punishment)

Executions carried out in Pennsylvania
Preceded by Elmo Lee Smith April 2, 1962	Keith William Zettlemoyer; May 2, 1995	Succeeded by Leon Jerome Moser August 16, 1995
Executions carried out in the United States
Preceded by Willie Clisby Jr. – Alabama April 29, 1995	Keith William Zettlemoyer – Pennsylvania; May 2, 1995	Succeeded by Emmitt Foster – Missouri May 3, 1995
