= Gary M. Heidnik =

American kidnapper, rapist, and murderer (1943–1999)

Gary Michael Heidnik
- Mugshot of Heidnik
- Born: November 22, 1943; Eastlake, Ohio, U.S.
- Died: July 6, 1999 (aged 55); SCI Rockview, Pennsylvania, U.S.
- Other name: Brother Bishop
- Spouse: Betty Disto (m. 1985; div. 1986)
- Children: 3
- Status: Executed by lethal injection
- Convictions: First degree murder (2 counts); Kidnapping (6 counts); Rape (5 counts); Aggravated assault (4 counts); Involuntary deviate sexual intercourse (2 counts)
- Penalty: Death (July 3, 1988)

Details
- Victims: 6 kidnapped 4 survivors 2 killed
- Span of crimes: 1978 – March 19, 1987
- Country: United States
- State: Pennsylvania
- Date apprehended: March 24, 1987

Gary Michael Heidnik (November 22, 1943 – July 6, 1999) was an American murderer and serial rapist who kidnapped, tortured and raped six women, murdering two of them, while holding them captive in a self-dug pit in his basement floor in Philadelphia between 1986 and 1987. He was sentenced to death and executed by lethal injection in July 1999, the last person executed in the state of Pennsylvania as of October 2026. Heidnik later became one of the inspirations for the character of Jame "Buffalo Bill" Gumb in The Silence of the Lambs.

== Early life ==
Gary Heidnik was born on November 22, 1943, in Eastlake, Ohio, a suburb of Cleveland, to Michael and Ellen Heidnik. He had a younger brother, Terry. After their parents divorced in 1946, Heidnik and his brother were raised by their Aunt Carol for four years before being placed in the care of their father and his new wife. Heidnik would later claim that he was emotionally and physically abused by his father. He suffered a lifelong problem of bedwetting and reported his father would humiliate him by forcing him to hang his stained sheets from his bedroom window, in full view of neighbors. Heidnik also stated that he even dangled him out the window, shaking him by the ankles. Heidnik's younger brother, Terry, would claim that their childhood was marked by frequent beatings by their father. Heidnik's father denied the abuse allegations after his son's arrest.

At school, Heidnik did not interact with fellow students and refused to make eye contact. When a well-meaning, new female student asked, "Did you get the homework done, Gary?" Heidnik yelled at her and told her she was not "worthy enough" to talk to him. He was also teased about his oddly shaped head, which he and Terry claimed was the result of a young Heidnik falling out of a tree. Nonetheless, Heidnik performed well academically and tested with an I.Q. of 148. With the encouragement of his father, a 14-year-old Heidnik enrolled for two years at the Staunton Military Academy in Staunton, Virginia, leaving before graduation. After another period in public high school, Heidnik dropped out and joined the United States Army at age 17.

Heidnik's military service lasted thirteen months. During basic training, his drill sergeant graded him as "excellent." He applied for several specialist positions, including the military police, but was rejected. Heidnik was assigned to San Antonio, Texas, to be trained as a medic, and did well through medical training. However, he did not stay in San Antonio for long and was transferred to the 46th Army Surgical Hospital in Landstuhl, West Germany. Within weeks of his new posting, Heidnik earned his GED. In August 1962 he began complaining of severe headaches, dizziness, blurred vision and nausea. A hospital neurologist diagnosed Heidnik with gastroenteritis and noted that he also displayed symptoms of mental illness, for which he was prescribed trifluoperazine. In October 1962, Heidnik was transferred to a military hospital in Philadelphia, where he was diagnosed with schizoid personality disorder and consequently honorably discharged from military service.

== Adulthood ==
Shortly after his discharge, Heidnik became a licensed practical nurse and enrolled at the University of Pennsylvania, only to drop out after a single semester. He worked at a Veterans Administration hospital in Coatesville, Pennsylvania, but was fired for poor attendance and rude behavior towards patients. Between August 1962 and his arrest in March 1987, Heidnik spent time in and out of psychiatric hospitals and had attempted suicide at least thirteen times. In 1970 his mother, who had been diagnosed with bone cancer and was suffering the effects of alcoholism, took her own life by drinking mercuric chloride. His brother Terry also spent time in mental institutions, and attempted suicide multiple times.

In October 1971, Heidnik incorporated a church called the "United Church of the Ministers of God," initially with a mere five followers. In 1975, he opened an account under the church's name with Merrill Lynch. The initial deposit was $1,500. Heidnik eventually amassed over $500,000 (equivalent to over $1.5 million in 2025). By 1986, the United Church of the Ministers of God was prosperous and opulent.

Heidnik used a matrimonial service to meet his future wife, Betty Disto, with whom he corresponded by mail for two years before proposing to her. Disto arrived from the Philippines in September 1985 and married Heidnik in Maryland the following month, on October 3. However, the marriage rapidly deteriorated after Disto caught Heidnik in bed with a trio of other women. Throughout the course of their brief marriage, Heidnik forced Disto to be an onlooker while he had sex with other women. Disto also accused Heidnik of repeatedly raping and assaulting her. With the help of the Filipino community in Philadelphia, she was able to leave Heidnik in January 1986. Unknown to Heidnik until his ex-wife requested child support payments in 1987, he had impregnated Disto during their short marriage.

Heidnik also had a child with Gail Lincow, a son named Gary Jr. The child was placed in foster care soon after his birth. Heidnik had a third child with another woman, Anjeanette Davidson, who was illiterate and developmentally disabled. Their daughter, Maxine Davidson, was born on March 16, 1978, and immediately placed in foster care. Shortly after Maxine's birth, Heidnik was arrested for the kidnapping and rape of Anjeanette's sister, Alberta, who had been living in an institution for the developmentally disabled in Penn Township.

== Criminal activities ==
=== 1976: First legal charges ===
In 1976, Heidnik was charged with aggravated assault and carrying an unlicensed pistol after shooting at the tenant of a house he offered for rent, grazing the man's face.

=== 1978: First imprisonment ===
In 1978, Heidnik signed out Alberta Davidson, the sister of his then-girlfriend Anjeanette Davidson, from the Harrisburg State Hospital on day leave and proceeded to imprison her in a locked storage room in his basement. After she was found and returned to the hospital, examination revealed that she had been raped and sodomized, and that she had contracted gonorrhea. Heidnik was arrested, charged, and convicted of kidnapping, rape, unlawful restraint, false imprisonment, involuntary deviant sexual intercourse, and interfering with the custody of a committed person. The original sentence was overturned on appeal and Heidnik spent three years of his incarceration in mental institutions prior to being released in April 1983, under the supervision of a state-sanctioned mental health program.

=== 1986: Spousal rape ===
After his wife left him in 1986, Heidnik was arrested again and charged with assault, indecent assault, spousal rape, and involuntary deviant sexual intercourse.

=== 1986–1987: Serial rape and murder ===
On November 25, 1986, Heidnik abducted a 25-year-old woman named Josefina Rivera. By January 1987, he had kidnapped another four women, whom he held captive in a pit in the basement of his house at 3520 North Marshall Street in North Philadelphia. The captives were raped, beaten, and tortured. Heidnik was white, and all of his kidnapping and murder victims were black. Heidnik's lawyer Charles Peruto stated that Heidnik "was trying to enslave 10 girls to have a baby with all of them, and he was going to create a perfect race. He believed that the races, eventually—hundreds of years from now—would all be mixed and there would only be one race. And that’s when we would find peace. He believed [white people] should mix with black people and vice versa so we could get closer to a perfect race."

One of the women, 24-year-old Sandra Lindsay, died of a combination of starvation, torture, and an untreated fever. Heidnik dismembered her body, but had problems dealing with the arms and legs, so he put them in a freezer and labeled them "dog food." He cooked her ribs in an oven and boiled her head in a pot on the stove. Police officers came to his house after his neighbors complained that a nauseating odor was emanating from his residence, but they left the premises after Heidnik explained: "I'm cooking a roast. I fell asleep and it burnt."

Several sources state that Heidnik ground up the flesh of Lindsay, mixed it with dog food, and fed it to his other victims. His defense attorney, Chuck Peruto, said that upon examination of a Cuisinart and other tools in his kitchen, they found no evidence of this. Peruto said that Heidnik made up the story to support the insanity defense. Peruto said that Heidnik started the rumor of cannibalism in public, and that there was no evidence of anyone eating human flesh.

Heidnik used electric shock as a form of torture. At one point, he forced three of his captives, bound in chains, into a pit. Heidnik ordered Rivera and another woman to fill the hole with water, and then forced Rivera to help him apply electric current from a stripped extension cord to the women's chains; 23-year-old Deborah Dudley was electrocuted, and Heidnik disposed of her body in the New Jersey Pine Barrens.

On January 18, 1987, Heidnik abducted Jacqueline Askins. The youngest of the six victims, Askins was only 18 years old at the time of her abduction. On May 5, 2018, a special report titled "Gary Heidnik's House of Horrors, 30 years later" was aired, featuring an interview in which Askins recounted that Heidnik wrapped duct tape around the mouths of the victims and stabbed them in their ears with a screwdriver.

On March 23, 1987, Heidnik and Rivera abducted 24-year-old Agnes Adams. The next day, Rivera convinced Heidnik to let her go, temporarily, so she could visit her family. He drove her to a gas station and said that he would wait for her there. She walked to her boyfriend's house; she initially wanted to confront Heidnik, but then decided to call the police instead. The responding officers, noting chafing from chains on her leg, went to the gas station and detained Heidnik. His purported best friend, Cyril Brown, was also arrested. Brown was released on $50,000 bail and an agreement that he would testify against Heidnik. In part, Brown admitted that he had witnessed Lindsay's death in the basement and that he had witnessed Heidnik's dismemberment of her body. Shortly after his arrest in April 1987, Heidnik attempted to hang himself in his jail cell.

== Trial, appeals and execution ==
At his arraignment, Heidnik claimed that the women were already in the house when he moved in. At trial, he was defended by Charles Peruto Jr., who attempted to prove that Heidnik was legally insane. Heidnik's insanity claim was successfully rebutted by the prosecution led by Charles Gallagher, III. The fact that Heidnik had successfully amassed approximately $550,000 through his brokerage account was used to prove that he was an astute investor, and therefore not insane. Testimony which was given by his Merrill Lynch financial advisor, Robert Kirkpatrick, was also used to prove Heidnik's mental competence. Kirkpatrick called Heidnik "an astute investor who knew exactly what he was doing."

On July 1, 1988, Heidnik was convicted of two counts of first degree murder, six counts of kidnapping, five counts of rape, four counts of aggravated assault and two counts of involuntary deviate sexual intercourse. He was sentenced to death and incarcerated at the State Correctional Institution at Pittsburgh. In January 1989, he attempted suicide with an overdose of prescribed thorazine.

In 1997, Heidnik's daughter, Maxine Davidson White, and his ex-wife, Betty Disto, filed a suit in federal court in the Eastern District of Pennsylvania, in which they requested a stay of execution on the basis that Heidnik was not competent enough to be executed. After two years of legal proceedings in various courts, on July 3, 1999, the U.S. District Court for the Eastern District of Pennsylvania issued its final ruling, clearing the way for Heidnik's execution. Republican governor of Pennsylvania Tom Ridge, who had campaigned on a pledge to accelerate the signing of death warrants which were delayed under former governor Bob Casey Sr., said Heidnik's execution was justified.

Heidnik's last meal was two slices of cheese pizza and black coffee. He was executed by lethal injection on July 6, 1999, at the State Correctional Institution – Rockview, in Bellefonte, Pennsylvania and his body was cremated. He was the last person executed by the Commonwealth of Pennsylvania, and remains the third of only three people executed there since the resumption of the death penalty. The other two were Keith Zettlemoyer in May 1995 and Leon Moser in August 1995.

== Victims ==
- Josefina Rivera — age 25, kidnapped on November 25, 1986.
- Sandra Lindsay — age 24, kidnapped on November 28th, 1986; murdered on February 7, 1987.
- Lisa Thomas — age 19, kidnapped on December 23, 1986.
- Deborah Dudley — age 23, kidnapped on January 2, 1987; murdered on March 19, 1987.
- Jacqueline Askins — age 18, kidnapped on January 18, 1987.
- Agnes Adams — age 24, kidnapped on March 24, 1987.

== In popular culture ==
Heidnik was one of three real-life murderers (the others were Ted Bundy and Ed Gein) upon whom author Thomas Harris based Jame "Buffalo Bill" Gumb, the villain of his 1988 novel The Silence of the Lambs. In 2018, the band SKYND released a song which was based on the events, featuring Jonathan Davis from Korn.

== See also ==
- List of long-term false imprisonment cases
- Capital punishment in Pennsylvania
- Capital punishment in the United States
- List of most recent executions by jurisdiction
- List of people executed in Pennsylvania
- List of people executed in the United States in 1999
- List of white defendants executed for killing a black victim
- Race and capital punishment in the United States

Executions carried out in Pennsylvania
Preceded by Leon Jerome Moser August 16, 1995	Gary Michael Heidnick; July 6, 1999	Succeeded by most recent
Executions carried out in the United States
Preceded by Charles Daniel Tuttle – Texas July 1, 1999	Leon Jerome Moser – Pennsylvania; July 6, 1999	Succeeded by Tyrone Leroy Fuller – Texas July 7, 1999
