= Joseph Daniel Miller =

Convicted American serial killer and rapist

- 2025 Mugshot of Miller
- Born: September 2, 1964 (age 62); Steelton, Pennsylvania, U.S.
- Other names: Joey; Killer Miller
- Convictions: First degree murder (x5); Theft; Arson; Assault; Kidnapping; Rape; Attempted murder
- Penalty: Death; commuted to life imprisonment

Details
- Victims: 5+
- Span of crimes: 1986–1990
- Country: United States
- State: Pennsylvania
- Date apprehended: August 6, 1992
- Imprisoned at: State Correctional Institution – Forest

Joseph "Joey" Daniel Miller (born September 2, 1964) is an American serial killer who raped and murdered at least five black women and girls between 1986 and 1990 in Harrisburg, Pennsylvania. In 1993, he was convicted and sentenced to death. After waiving his appeals, Miller was nearly executed on May 4, 2000. However, 30 hours before his scheduled execution, Miller reversed course and allowed his lawyers to file an appeal on his behalf. In 2002, Miller's sentence was commuted to life in prison on the grounds that he was intellectually disabled. The ruling was upheld on appeal by the Supreme Court of Pennsylvania in 2008.

== Biography ==
Miller was born on September 2, 1964, in a poor Steelton family, with three other brothers and a sister. Early on, he showed signs of an intellectual disability, was a poor learner and suffered from anterograde amnesia, for which he was bullied by his classmates. As a result of his poor academic performance, he dropped out from school after the 4th grade. Both of Joseph's parents were physically and emotionally abusive towards him, which greatly influenced his psycho-emotional state. During this period, he was sexually harassed by his uncle and, under the influence of his older brother, began to commit petty thefts and drank alcohol. His father was accused of incest, after Joseph's older sister, at the age of 15, gave birth to a daughter in 1970, telling police that her own father was the child's father as well, who had sexually abused her for two years. Although she went to the police, she received death threats from her mother and other relatives, due to which she ran away from home. Her testimony was questioned, and thus, Joseph's father was ultimately not charged. In 1976, at the age of 12, Miller was severely beaten by a group of peers during a street fight, after which he took a shotgun from his father, tracked down the offenders and shot at them, wounding the teenagers. He was quickly apprehended, convicted and sent to an institution for juvenile delinquents. While in custody, Joseph was sexually assaulted by fellow inmates and beaten by the overseers on several occasions, which led to him developing PTSD-like symptoms. He was released in the early 1980s, but soon began to commit crimes again, in addition to using drugs. At one point, he suffered a near-fatal drug overdose, and was arrested several times for theft, assault, arson and illegal firearms possession. In 1984, Miller left Steelton and moved to Harrisburg, where he found housing and married a girl who bore him three children from 1985 to 1993. Due to his lack of education, he had to engage in low-skilled labor, and often changed jobs during this time.

== Exposure ==
On August 5, 1992, Miller, together with a friend, visited a bar in Harrisburg, where he met a black girl named Clara Johnson, offering to give her a lift home. Johnson agreed to Miller's proposal, on the condition that his friend was with them during the trip. After all of them got in, Miller, despite his passenger's protests, dropped the friend off and went to the outskirts of the city, where he and Johnson began fighting in a vacant lot near some train tracks, where he beat her, tied her up and raped her twice. After the second rape, he tortured her, dragged the victim to a nearby ditch, where he had planned to kill her and dump the body. At that moment, a patrol car arrived at the scene after being informed that someone had been trespassing. Miller fled the scene, leaving Johnson and his car behind. The officers located her soon after, and after searching through Miller's car, they found a lot of evidence that incriminated him in kidnapping, rape and attempted murder. After establishing his identity, he was put on a wanted list as a fugitive. The next day, he was discovered in his home city of Steelton, where he was hiding in his relatives' house. He resisted the arresting policemen fiercely, releasing himself from their grip and barricading himself on the house's rooftop. He threatened to commit suicide, but after a 6-hour long negotiation with police officers, he surrendered himself and was arrested.

While in custody, he renounced his Miranda rights and soon after, confessed to the murders of two girls. According to his testimony, on May 15, 1987, he got a group of young girls in his car, and after all but one of the passengers left the car, Miller attacked the remaining girl, 18-year-old Selina Franklin, whom he raped and strangled. On November 6, 1989, Miller offered 23-year-old Harrisburg resident Stephanie McDuffey a ride home. After she got into his car, Miller beat her and took the victim to the city's outskirts, where he raped and strangled her as well. To support his claims, he showed the investigators the burial sites on a map, and their bodies were subsequently discovered in mid-August 1992. A few weeks after that, he confessed to the murder of 25-year-old Jeanette Thomas, who went missing on January 8, 1990; her naked corpse was found only a few days later at a dump. During the investigation, a local named William Kelly Jr. confessed to the Thomas murder and was convicted, but later on, his lawyers filed an appeal which stated it was a false confession. A forensic psychiatric examination determined that Kelly suffered from an inferiority complex, manic-depressive psychosis and alcoholism, which raised doubts about the legitimacy of his confession. In a new trial, all charges against William Kelly were dropped, and he was released in January 1993. On March 25, 1993, Miller was convicted of killing Selina Franklin and Stephanie McDuffey, as well as the kidnapping and rape of Clara Johnson, for which he was sentenced to death. In subsequent years, Miller's lawyers filed multiple appeals to commute his death sentence, even asking for a new trial, but they were all rejected.

In the late 1990s, Joseph confessed to the murder of Kathy Schenk. On February 27, 1990, he picked her up and drove her to Perry County, where he raped and strangled her thereafter. In a follow-up trial, he was convicted of Schenk's killing and received a life imprisonment term. In February 2000, Miller received an execution date of May 4, 2000, after waiving his appeals. However, on May 2, 2000, just 30 hours before he was set to die, however, he reversed course and allowed his lawyers to file an appeal on his behalf.

In 2014, thanks to an examination of DNA at the FBI's laboratory in Quantico, the identity of a girl whose remains were discovered in a landfill in February 1997, not far from where Franklin and McDuffey's remains were found, was established. The victim was identified as 26-year-old Kelly Ann Ward, who went missing in February 1986 from Harrisburg. Miller became the prime suspect almost instantly, due to the similarities in Ward's murder and those of his other known victims: the deceased was black, engaged in prostitution, killed with a pipe found near her body, and was disposed of near old car tires and tile pieces, all signs corresponding with Miller's victims. In 2002, Miller's sentence was commuted to life in prison on the grounds that he was intellectually disabled. The ruling was upheld on appeal by the Supreme Court of Pennsylvania in 2008.

It was only in April 2016 when Miller confessed on tape to the murders of Ward and Jeanette Thomas. During his testimony, he apologized to the victims' relatives and stated that he wanted to plead guilty, as he was moved by the conversations he had had with the deceased women's relatives. Joseph Miller was charged with Ward and Thomas' murders. Dauphin County prosecutors revealed that although Miller had confessed to the killing way back in 1992, he wasn't charged with it, as he was already on death row. In June of that same year, 24 years later, Miller was returned to Harrisburg to stand trial. On the basis of his confessions, on June 24, 2016, he was found guilty of the murders, and subsequently sentenced to two more life imprisonment terms.

Miller is currently incarcerated in the State Correctional Institution - Camp Hill.

=== Victims ===
The following is a list of Miller's victims in chronological order.

- Kelly Ann Ward, February, 1986
- Selina Franklin, 1987
- Stephanie McDuffey, 1990
- Jeanette Thomas, January, 1990
- Kathi Novena Schenck, 1990

== See also ==
- List of serial killers in the United States
