= Antonio Rodriguez (serial killer) =

American serial killer

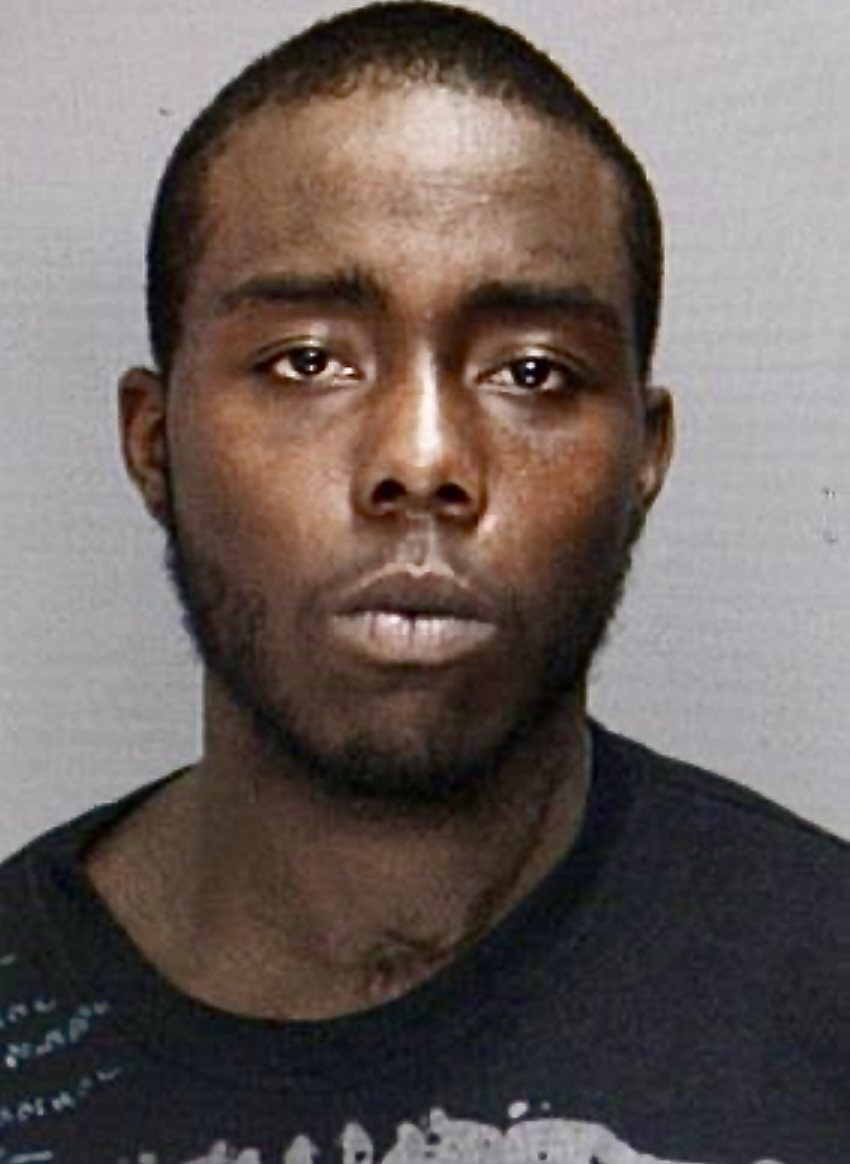
- Mugshot
- Born: October 28, 1988 (age 37); Philadelphia, Pennsylvania, U.S.
- Other names: "The Kensington Strangler" "Black"; Antonio Rodriquez
- Convictions: First degree murder (3 counts); Rape (3 counts); Involuntary deviate sexual intercourse (3 counts); Abuse of a corpse (3 counts)
- Penalty: Life imprisonment

Details
- Victims: 3
- Span of crimes: November 3 – December 15, 2010
- Country: United States
- State: Pennsylvania
- Date apprehended: January 17, 2011
- Imprisoned at: State Correctional Institution – Rockview, Benner Township, Pennsylvania, U.S.

Antonio Rodriguez (born October 28, 1988), known as The Kensington Strangler, is an American serial killer who was convicted of raping and killing three women from November to December 2010, all of which occurred within a 10-block radius of Philadelphia's Kensington neighborhood. For his crimes, Rodriguez was sentenced to three life terms, which he is currently serving at State Correctional Institution – Rockview in Benner Township, Pennsylvania.

== Murders ==
On November 3, 2010, the half-naked body of 21-year-old Elaine Goldberg, a nursing student at the Gwynedd Mercy University who had recently recovered from substance use disorder, was found in a parking lot on Ruth Street. Ten days later, the body of 35-year-old sex worker Nicole Piacentini, of Port Richmond, was found in similar circumstances less than a mile away from where Goldberg's body was located. While police initially claimed that there was no indication that the two murders were connected, tests conducted on DNA collected from both crime scenes was later matched to the same unknown perpetrator. Upon announcing this, several other local women came forward and claimed that they had been assaulted by a stranger.

On December 15, the half-naked body of a third victim, 27-year-old Casey Mahoney of Asheville, North Carolina, was found in a patch of woods near some railroad tracks of the Kensington area. Like the previous victims, she struggled with a substance use disorder from which she was trying to recover. She was dumped in an isolated area and was sexually assaulted. The similarities in the three murders started rumors that a serial killer was roaming the streets, putting pressure on the police in order to catch the assailant.

== Investigation and arrest ==
Two days after Mahoney's murder, Philadelphia police released CCTV footage of a man suspected of assaulting a woman in Kensington on December 6, saying that the suspect could be connected to the recent murders in the area. The video showed what appeared to be a black male in his early 20s with long sideburns, who walked with a characteristic gait and supposedly said to his assault victim that his name was "Anthony".

An anonymous tip led to the arrest of a homeless vagrant, 22-year-old Antonio Rodriguez, who had been released from the Curran-Fromhold Correctional Facility on August 29, 2010, after serving a 3-month term for a felony drug charge. As a felon, he was obligated to submit his DNA into CODIS on October 25, but as the Philadelphia police had a backlog of more than 5,000 cases, they were unable to link him to the murders until January 10. Rodriguez was arrested in the kitchen of an abandoned house on January 17 by a joint team of detectives and marshals. In his subsequent confessions, Rodriguez claimed that he initially met the victims to use their services, but during the acts, he would start to choke and beat them until they eventually died. He also acknowledged that even though he knew they were already dead, he nonetheless continued to have sex with their corpses.

The delay in his arrest caused controversy due to the time DNA processing took place, with estimates suggesting that if it had been processed fast enough, Rodriguez could have been arrested before he killed Mahoney. The backlash led to calls for some funds to be allocated to the Philadelphia Police Department, which had trouble with properly testing kits connected to violent crimes.

== Trial, sentence and imprisonment ==
Rodriguez was soon charged with three counts of murder and was held in prison without bond. Prosecutors announced that they would not seek the death penalty, citing the accused's history of mental illness and the fact that he waived his right to a jury trial. At his subsequent trial, Rodriguez's attorney attempted to bar the prosecution from presenting his client's graphic written confessions from being used in court, in addition to questioning the legitimacy of how they were obtained in the first place.

Rodriguez was found guilty on all counts and handed three consecutive life terms. After his sentencing, Rodriguez was transferred to serve his sentence at State Correctional Institution – Rockview.

== See also ==
- List of serial killers in the United States
