= Injustice Watch =

News website covering courts in Chicago

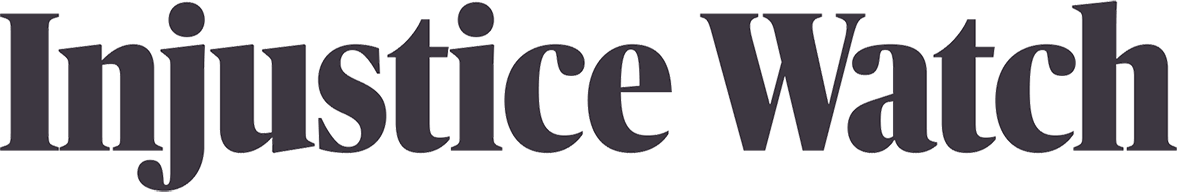
- Founded: 2015; 11 years ago
- Founder: Rob Warden; Rick Tulsky
- Type: Investigative journalism
- Tax ID no.: 47-4537172
- Legal status: 501(c)(3)
- Purpose: Judiciary of Illinois
- Location: Chicago, Illinois, U.S.
- Region served: Chicagoland
- Budget: $1.14 million (2022)
- Revenue: $2.27 million (2022)
- Website: www.injusticewatch.org

Injustice Watch is a nonprofit investigative journalism organization based in Chicago, covering the Circuit Court of Cook County and other parts of the criminal justice system in the region.

== History ==
Injustice Watch was co-founded by Center on Wrongful Convictions founder Rob Warden and Pulitzer Prize-winning journalist Rick Tulsky in 2015.

== Journalism ==
The publication's work has been described as "activism journalism," rejecting the idea of journalistic objectivity in favor of a focus on "fairness" and "ethics." Injustice Watch also publishes a guide for voters to learn more about candidates for election or retention to the state judiciary.

== Reception ==
Injustice Watch's coverage of bail hearings, pre-trial detention, and prosecutorial discretion have received attention from legal scholars. In 2019, the organization announced the Plain View Project, a database documenting the use of racist language online by police officers, which has been used as evidence for racial bias in American policing and was a finalist in the 2020 Online Journalism Awards. In 2023, the organization received an award in the "small newsrooms" category from the Better Government Association for its coverage of court-ordered remote alcohol monitoring.

== See also ==
- Innocence Project – American legal non-profit (founded 1992)
- ProPublica – US-based nonprofit investigative journalism organization
