= Leon Moser =

American murderer (1942–1995)

- Born: September 15, 1942; Milwaukee, Wisconsin, U.S.
- Died: August 16, 1995 (aged 52); SCI Rockview, Pennsylvania, U.S.
- Status: Executed by lethal injection
- Motive: Custody dispute
- Convictions: First degree murder (3 counts); Possession of an instrument of crime
- Penalty: Death (January 24, 1986)

Details
- Victims: 3
- Date: March 31, 1985
- State: Pennsylvania

Leon Jerome Moser (September 15, 1942 – August 16, 1995) was an American convicted murderer who was executed in Pennsylvania for the 1985 murders of his ex-wife and two daughters in Montgomery County. He was the second person to be executed in Pennsylvania since the United States reinstated capital punishment in 1976.

== Early life ==
Moser was born on September 15, 1942, in Milwaukee, Wisconsin. He was the son of a farmer and the fourth of five boys. After graduating from high school, Moser attended a Roman Catholic seminary of the Salvadorian order for two years. He left due to poor academic performance and worked at an elementary school for a year. Afterward, he joined the army and received rave reviews in a performance evaluation. He met his future wife, Linda, while stationed at Fort Dix in New Jersey. The couple got married on April 26, 1969. Leon and Linda divorced in September 1984. He was a Vietnam veteran and former seminarian.

== Murders ==
On March 31, 1985, Moser attended Palm Sunday services at the St. James Episcopal Church in Evansburg, Pennsylvania. He had arranged to meet his ex-wife, Linda Moser, and his two daughters, Donna and Joanne Moser. According to Linda's parents, her husband had beaten her on several occasions. The girls were to spend the afternoon with Leon once the service ended. After the service, the four of them went outside to Leon's car. Leon asked Linda if he could take his daughters back to visit his parents' home in Wisconsin. Linda refused, and an argument ensued. Joanne got into the back seat of Leon's car, while Donna remained standing by the front of the car.

As Linda walked back towards the church, Leon went to the back of his car and took out a .30-06 Remington 700 bolt-action rifle. He aimed the gun at the back of Joanne's head and pulled the trigger. Linda turned around and screamed as Leon aimed at her and fatally shot her in the chest. He then took aim at Donna and shot her in the head. After the shootings, Leon placed the rifle at his side and fired into the air. He fell to the ground as if shot, and remained there until the police arrived. Linda and Joanne were pronounced dead at the scene, while Donna later died en route to Suburban Hospital in Norristown.

== Trial ==
Moser had been violent towards Linda in the past. In March 1984, he had put a knife to her throat and threatened to kill her. He had also previously grabbed her neck and choked her. Prior to the shootings, Moser had recently lost his job as a janitor and was also being treated at a psychiatric unit for depression.

Moser pleaded guilty to the murders and a weapon charge and was sentenced to death on January 24, 1986. He refused all appeals and did not fight his execution. He made a statement in court in 1986 in which he said "All I want to do, sir, is just die. Just give me the death penalty, sir. Please? And please have it carried out as soon as possible, sir. Please?"

== Execution ==
On June 1, 1995, Moser and three other inmates on Pennsylvania's death row had their execution warrants signed by Governor Tom Ridge. Moser's was set for August 15. Unlike the others, Moser wanted to be executed. Fellow death row inmate, Mumia Abu-Jamal, who was scheduled for execution two days after Moser, won a stay of execution on August 7. Following the stay, Abu-Jamal and his supporters requested and encouraged Moser to fight to save his own life. Ultimately, Moser rejected their requests.

Moser was executed by lethal injection on August 16, 1995, at State Correctional Institution – Rockview. He declined to make a final statement. His last meal was two slices of pizza, cold cuts, pasta salad, a frosted cupcake, and Coca-Cola. He became the second person to be executed by the state of Pennsylvania since the resumption of the death penalty in 1976. He remains the second of only three people to be executed in Pennsylvania since the resumption of capital punishment. The others were Keith Zettlemoyer in May 1995 and Gary M. Heidnik in 1999.

== Legacy ==
The murders of Linda Moser and her daughters led to a change in the law in Pennsylvania. A year after Linda's death, the Pennsylvania General Assembly changed the state Crime Code, giving police the power to make arrests in domestic violence cases based on evidence. Prior to this, police had to witness an assault before making an arrest. In 1988, the legislature went further and amended the 1978 Protection from Abuse Act. The new amendments allowed women to file for protection without the assistance of a lawyer.

== See also ==
- List of people executed in Pennsylvania
- List of people executed in the United States in 1995
- Volunteer (capital punishment)

Executions carried out in Pennsylvania
Preceded by Keith William Zettlemoyer May 2, 1995	Leon Jerome Moser; August 16, 1995	Succeeded by Gary Michael Heidnick July 6, 1999
Executions carried out in the United States
Preceded by Vernon Lamar Sattiewhite – Texas August 15, 1995	Leon Jerome Moser – Pennsylvania; August 16, 1995	Succeeded by Sylvester Lewis Adams – South Carolina August 18, 1995
