= Zhao Zhihong =

Chinese serial killer and rapist

- 赵志红
- Zhao during interrogation
- Born: 5 September 1972; Yongxing, Liangcheng County, Inner Mongolia, China
- Died: 30 July 2019 (aged 46); Hohhot, Inner Mongolia, China
- Cause of death: Execution by shooting
- Other names: "The Smiling Killer" "Demon"
- Convictions: Murder (11 counts); Rape (10 counts); Robbery
- Penalty: Death

Details
- Victims: 11
- Span of crimes: 1996–2005
- Country: China
- State: Inner Mongolia
- Date apprehended: 23 October 2005

Zhao Zhihong (simplified Chinese: 赵志红; traditional Chinese: 趙志紅; pinyin: Zhào Zhìhóng; 5 September 1972 – 30 July 2019), nicknamed The Smiling Killer and Demon, was a Chinese serial killer and rapist. He admitted to committing a total of 20 serious crimes between 1996 and 2005, including raping and killing eleven women in Ulanqab and Hohhot in Inner Mongolia. He was executed in 2019 following a court verdict.

== Biography ==
Zhao Zhihong was born on 5 September 1972, in the village of Yongxing, Liangcheng County. After graduating from school, he worked in low-skill jobs without staying anywhere for a long time.

Zhao committed his first murder on 9 April 1996, raping and strangling a young textile mill worker surnamed Yang in a public toilet in Hohhot. Her body was discovered by an 18-year-old Chinese Mongol named Huugjilt, who was mistakenly accused of the murder, forced to confess by investigators, and sentenced to death on 23 May 1996. He was executed by firing squad on 10 June 1996.

On 20 May 2000, Zhao committed a second rape-murder of a young girl in the Hohhot area, which remained unsolved for a long time. He did not kill again until 2005, when he raped and killed four girls and women. The first two occurred on 2 and 7 January, and the third on 24 February. At the same time, local authorities were seriously worried about the serial killings, offering a reward of 2,000 yuan for information about the killer's identity and whereabouts. In July 2005, Zhao killed his last victim.

== Arrest, trial and execution ==
In June 2005, Yun Wen, a resident of the village of Tali in suburban Hohhot, where Zhao committed his last killings, identified the killer from a photo shoot. However, she did not know his name or place of residence. While looking for the offender with the police, she identified Zhao Zhihong at his workplace, and on 23 October 2005, he was arrested.

Zhao immediately confessed, admitting to having committed more than 20 crimes between 1996 and 2005, including 11 murders and 10 rapes, two of which were against minors. In addition, he was also responsible for several cases of robberies, theft, and misappropriation of property. Most controversially, he admitted to killing mill worker Yang in 1996, a crime for which the 18-year-old Mongolian male youth Huugjilt (ᠬᠥᠭᠵᠢᠯᠲᠦ) was executed. On December 5, 2006, while still serving his sentence at the Hohhot No. 1 Detention Center, Zhao Zhihong wrote a special petition for life repayment. The full text is as follows:

To the Respected Prosecutors of the Supreme People’s Procuratorate, greetings:

I am Zhao Zhihong, the criminal responsible for the “2·25” serial murder case. My trial concluded on November 28, 2006. However, I noticed that during the trial, the prosecution made no mention whatsoever of the murder that took place in April 1996 at the public restroom in the Mao family residential compound in Hohhot. I don’t understand why this was omitted, as I was indeed the perpetrator of that crime, and the victim did, in fact, die.

Since my arrest, through the education provided by the government, I have regained a sense of conscience and humanity at the end of my life. With the attitude of “taking responsibility for one’s own actions,” I have actively cooperated with the authorities in fully investigating my crimes. I now respectfully request that your office assign personnel to re-investigate and thoroughly verify the facts of this case—to bring justice to the deceased, to clear the names of the wrongly accused, to uphold the fairness of the law, and to allow the public to understand the truth. I wish to face the end of my life without regrets.

In conclusion, I sincerely hope this matter will receive your attention, approval, and strong support from your leadership.

Respectfully submitted, and thank you.

Zhao Zhihong Prisoner No. 14, Team 2

Hohhot No. 1 Detention Center

Due to constant new developments in Zhao's case, his trial was frequently postponed. However, on 15 December 2014, the Hohhot District Court posthumously acquitted Huugjilt, publicly apologizing to his relatives and paying them 330,000 yuan in compensation.

Zhao's trial began on 5 January 2015, and was held behind closed doors. In total, the serial killer was charged with 21 crimes. Zhao himself expressed regret that an innocent man was executed for his crime and apologized in his courtroom confession. Nevertheless, on 9 February 2015, the District Court of Hohhot found the 42-year-old guilty of 11 murders, 10 rapes, and at least one case of robbery. He was deprived of his civil rights and sentenced to death by firing squad. In addition, according to the court's verdict, he was obliged to pay a fine of 155,000 yuan, of which 53,000 yuan went to the state and 102,000 to the victims' relatives.

On 30 July 2019, Zhao was executed. Before his execution, he refused a last meeting with the victim's relatives, which was due to him by law.

== See also ==
- List of serial killers in China
