= Huugjilt =

Chinese Mongol man who was wrongly executed

- Huugjilt in an undated photo

Chinese name
- Simplified Chinese: 呼格吉勒图
- Traditional Chinese: 呼格吉勒圖
Transcriptions
Standard Mandarin
- Hanyu Pinyin: Hūgéjílètú

Mongolian name
- Mongolian Cyrillic: Хөгжилд
- Mongolian script: ᠬᠥᠭᠵᠢᠯᠲᠦ

Huugjilt (21 September 1977 – 10 June 1996), also spelled Hugjiltu, was a Chinese Mongol man who was wrongfully executed on 10 June 1996 for the rape and murder of a woman. On 5 December 2006, ten years after the execution, Zhao Zhihong wrote the Petition of My Death Penalty, admitting he had committed the crime. Huugjilt was posthumously exonerated, and Zhao Zhihong was sentenced to death in 2015. Xinhua stated that the case was "one of the most notorious cases of judicial injustice in China in the recent decade."

Huugjilt, an ethnic Mongol, had only a single name.

== Background ==
The Second Strike Hard Against Crime Campaign was initiated by Jiang Zemin, the new Chinese president who had been groomed by former state leader Deng Xiaoping. The Huugjilt case is one of the many wrongful convictions it has caused.

== Crime ==
A woman surnamed Yang was raped and murdered inside a public toilet in a Hohhot textile factory on 9 April 1996. The woman had been fatally strangled. Huugjilt had discovered the body and alerted authorities, but he was arrested and accused of committing the crime.

== Trial and execution of Huugjilt ==
The original trial operated on the grounds that Huugjilt had confessed to the crime. The confession occurred within 48 hours. Hohhot authorities stated that there was a quota of criminal cases to conclude, and that this influenced the treatment of Huugjilt. In an opinion article about the case, the China Daily stated, "It has not been rare for higher authorities to exert pressure on local public security departments and judiciary to crack serious murder cases. Nor has it been rare for the police to extort confessions through torture. And suspects have been sentenced without solid evidence except for extorted confessions."

Huugjilt was held for 61 days. 18 at the time of his conviction, he was sentenced to death on 23 May 1996. He was executed by firing squad, on 10 June of that year; he was 18 at the time of his death.

== Zhao Zhihong's confession ==
Several media reports released after the execution stated that the court system used incorrect information, and several legal experts concurred with this thesis.

Zhao Zhihong, who had committed thirteen rapes of women and girls and murders of ten individuals from 1996 to 2005, On 5 December 2006, while still serving his sentence at the Hohhot No. 1 Detention Center, Zhao Zhihong confessed to killing Yang. The Chinese justice system determined Zhao had committed a total of 21 crimes. He was originally scheduled to be tried for killing nine women and girls in late 2006, but this trial was adjourned and pushed back to November 2014. On 5 January 2015, Zhao's trial by the Hohhot Intermediate People's Court commenced. On Monday 9 February 2015, Zhao received a death sentence, was asked to pay 102,768 renminbi to the victims, had all political rights removed forever, and received a fine of 53,000 renminbi ($8,464 U.S. dollars). He was executed in 2019.

== Exoneration and aftermath ==
After Zhao's confession, Huugjilt's parents demanded that the court system revisit the murder case so Huugjilt may be exonerated. The retrial of Huugjilt in the High People's Court of the Inner Mongolia Autonomous Region took place from November through December 2014, concluding with his exoneration. It was partially on the grounds that in his confession he did not properly recount the crime nor the physical description and accent of Yang.

The deputy president of the court, Zhao Jianping (赵建平), gave 30,000 renminbi ($37,960 Hong Kong dollars, $4,500 U.S. dollars) to Huugjilt's parents, Li Sanren and Shang Aiyun. Both Li and Shang received 2,059,621.4 renminbi ($332,116 U.S. dollars, or over £220,000 British pounds) in compensation from the Higher People's Court of Inner Mongolia, making up for the length of Huugilt's detention, his death, the loss experienced by Li and Shang, and the costs of the funeral. Hugjilt's family took a copy of the exoneration notice to his gravesite and burned it there as a way of telling him that he had been exonerated.

Inner Mongolia authorities sanctioned 27 government officials as a result of the wrongful execution. Feng Zhiming (冯志明), the Hohhot Public Security Bureau Xincheng District branch head, was blacklisted, and he had the possibility of being criminally tried. Charges include accepting bribery, dereliction of duty, and gaining confessions by using torture. The others received demerits and other administrative sanctions. They included ten other officials from the Hohhot PSB, three officials from the Hohhot Intermediate People's Court and the region's Higher People's Court, as well as ex-chief procurator Wen Da and six other officials of the Hohhot People's Procuratorate. Li and Shang believed the punishments for the officials were too lenient.

According to Beijing Foreign Studies University professor of journalism Zhan Jiang, the public sympathised with Huugjilt since he was young at the time of his death. The Huugjilt case became a commonly discussed topic on Sina Weibo, with lawyers discussing the topic.

Javier C. Hernández of The New York Times wrote that the authorities in China feared instability in governance and so did not pursue accountability measures against the people who prosecuted Huugjlt.
