= Rob Warden =

American legal affairs journalist (born 1940)

- Born: November 24, 1940 (age 85); Carthage, Missouri
- Occupations: Co-director, Injustice Watch; Executive Director emeritus, Center on Wrongful Convictions; American Journalist
- Website: published articles at injusticewatch.org

Rob Warden is an American legal affairs journalist and co-founder of three organizations dedicated to exonerating the innocent and reforming criminal justice: the Center on Wrongful Convictions at Northwestern University Pritzker School of Law, the National Registry of Exonerations at the University of California-Irvine, and Injustice Watch, a non-partisan, not-for-profit, journalism organization that conducts in-depth research exposing institutional failures that obstruct justice and equality. As an investigative journalist in the 1970s, he began focusing on death penalty cases, which led to a career exposing and publicizing the injustices and misconduct in the legal system. Warden's work was instrumental in the blanket commutation of death row cases in Illinois in 2003 and in the abolition of the Illinois death penalty in 2011.

Warden has done pioneering research work in the field of wrongful convictions that has paved the way for widespread changes in criminal justice practices, including changes in interrogation methods, in eyewitness identification procedures as well as exposing the over-reliance by prosecutors of jailhouse informants and false confessions. Warden is also the author of several books on wrongful conviction cases.

== Early career ==
Warden grew up in Carthage, Missouri. He began his journalism career in Missouri in 1960 at the Joplin Globe and went on to work at the Columbia Tribune, the Kalamazoo Gazette, and then in 1965 to the Chicago Daily News, where he was an award-winning Chicago beat reporter and a foreign correspondent until it folded in 1978. At the Daily News, in the mid-1970s, he served as a foreign correspondent based in Beirut, where he and his wife and children were under siege in an ocean-front hotel for several days before they were evacuated.

== Career in Criminal Justice Journalism ==
In 1978, after Warden was asked by a progressive bar association to expand its newsletter, he launched the Chicago Lawyer, which began by reporting on the judicial selection process but soon expanded to reporting on false confessions, police misconduct and judicial incompetence.

In 1982, The Chicago Lawyer published its first of many investigative stories focusing on the “Ford Heights Four” a highly publicized case in which 4 young black men had been convicted by an all-white jury of murder. Warden was first alerted to the gross prosecutorial misconduct which would later be uncovered in that case when he received an unsolicited letter from one of the defendants on death row. It took another 15 years until the wrongfully convicted inmates were to be released and exonerated, after receiving help from students at the Medill School of Journalism at Northwestern who investigated the case for a school assignment.

Warden's reporting was also instrumental in the first DNA-based exoneration in Illinois—that of Gary Dotson who had been falsely convicted of a rape that in fact had not occurred. The Chicago Lawyer focused on many other Death Row cases including Darby Tillis and Perry Cobb, Rolando Cruz and Alex Hernandez, all of whom were later exonerated.

In a law review article, Warden described how he had evolved from a supporter of capital punishment into a crusader for abolition—referring to a thesis advanced by Supreme Court Justice Thurgood Marshall that the average citizen, if fully informed of the realities of capital punishment, would “find it shocking to his conscience and sense of justice.”

== Career in Criminal Justice Reform ==
In 1999, Warden helped found the Center on Wrongful Convictions, part of the Bluhm Legal Clinic at Northwestern University School of Law. During his tenure there (1999-2014), the Center was instrumental in approximately 25 exonerations of innocent men and women in Illinois.

Warden is the co-author with James Tuohy of Greylord: Justice, Chicago Style (about "Operation Greylord" a sting investigation into judicial corruption in Chicago) and with David Protess of A Promise of Justice (about the wrongful convictions of “the Ford Heights Four”) and Gone in the Night (about the false conviction of a suburban Chicago man for the murder of his stepdaughter). He contributed legal analysis for a 2005 Northwestern edition reprinting of The Dead Alive, a 19th-century novel by Wilkie Collins based on the 1819 wrongful murder convictions of two brothers in Vermont. In 2009, Warden edited True Stories of False Confessions, an anthology of 29 articles on false confessions published by Northwestern University Press in 2009. In 2018, the Journal of Law & Social Policy published a comprehensive article by Warden and co-author Daniel Lennard on the American experience with capital punishment.

In 2015 he joined Pulitzer Prize-winning journalist Rick Tulsky to launch Injustice Watch.

Warden has won more than 50 awards, including the Medill School of Journalism's John Bartlow Martin Award for Public Interest Magazine Journalism, two American Civil Liberties Union James McGuire Awards, five Peter Lisagor Awards from the Society of Professional Journalists, the Norval Morris Award from the Illinois Academy of Criminology, the Thomas and Eleanor Wright Award from the Chicago Commission on Human Relations “for outstanding achievements in improving human relations,” the Innocence Network's Lifetime Achievement Award, and the Illinois Association of Criminal Defense Lawyers’ Promotion of Social Justice Award.

He is credited as being "pivotal to the sea change in the national discourse about wrongful convictions and the death penalty" in the years since he began his investigative work.

== Commentary ==
Profile by Mara Tapp in the Chicago Tribune:

Rob Warden and David Protess are about the last people a prosecutor wants to see waiting outside the courtroom. That is just the way they like it, because they have spent their professional lives as journalists warning as loudly as they could of the unexamined power of the government to destroy innocent people through the power of wrongful prosecution.

== Works ==
- Tuohy, James; Warden, Rob (1989). Greylord : justice, Chicago style. Putnam. ISBN 9780399133855.
- Protess, David; Warden, Rob (1993). Gone in the Night. Delacorte. ISBN 978-0-385-30619-5.
- Protess, David; Warden, Rob (1998). A Promise of Justice. Hyperion. ISBN 978-0-7868-6294-8.
- Collins, Wilkie; Warden, Rob (2005). Wilkie Collins's The dead alive : the novel, the case, and wrongful convictions. Northwestern University Press. ISBN 978-0-8101-2294-9.
- Warden, Rob; Drizen, Steven A. (2009). True stories of false confessions. Northwestern University Press. ISBN 9780810126039.
