= Murder in Pennsylvania law =

Murder in Pennsylvania law constitutes the intentional killing, under circumstances defined by law, of people within or under the jurisdiction of the U.S. state of Pennsylvania.

The United States Centers for Disease Control and Prevention reported that in the year 2020, the state had a murder rate somewhat above the median for the entire country.

== Felony murder rule ==
Pennsylvania was the first state to differentiate the crime of "murder" into degrees based upon the culpability of the perpetrator. The most significant departure was the division of murder into degrees, a change initiated by the Pennsylvania legislation of 1794. Dressler goes onto explain, "Other states followed the Pennsylvania practice until at one time the vast majority of American jurisdictions differentiated degrees of murder and the term 'first-degree murder' passed into common parlance."

Up until the 1960s, the common law definition of 'murder' was intentional homicide with malice aforethought; i.e. it was codified without respect to distinct elements as it is today. First degree murder in this epoch of criminal law, and in Pennsylvania at the time the statute of 1794 was ratified, was reserved for intentional homicide whereby the conduct was 'willful', 'deliberate', or 'premeditated'. The interesting point to note is that the assignment of either a first degree or second degree charge was not mandated by the common law (or the statute); that is, the decision to try a defendant for intentional homicide, in either the first or second degree was left solely in the hands of the jury. Later, in the 20th century, this became problematic in cases involving capital punishment. Because the assignment of first (or second) degree murder to a given defendant was, in a sense, randomly chosen by the jury rather than adhered to by a strict set of codes or defined elements of a crime, the argument, asserting that the levying of a capital punishment in the absence of given set of procedures fundamentally conflicted with the notions embodied by due process, gained prominence, and the constitutional legitimacy of capital punishment for certain offenses or offenders was challenged in subsequent Supreme Court cases.

In the Commonwealth of Pennsylvania, common law felony murder was codified as "Murder of the Second Degree." The statute provides that "[c]riminal homicide constitutes murder of the second degree when it is committed while defendant was engaged as a principal or an accomplice in the perpetration of a felony."

The Pennsylvania formulation narrows the doctrine. Indeed, "Perpetration of a Felony" is statutorily defined as:

The act of the defendant in engaging in or being an accomplice in the commission of, or an attempt to commit, or flight after committing, or attempting to commit robbery, rape, or deviate sexual intercourse by force or threat of force, arson, burglary or kidnapping.

A killing caused during the perpetration of a felony that is not otherwise listed in § 2502(d), i.e. aggravated assault, would be charged as Murder of the Third Degree or as a less culpable homicide provision.

== Penalties ==
Offense	Mandatory sentence
Involuntary manslaughter	Up to 5 years in prison (parole eligibility cannot exceed more than half the maximum sentence)
Voluntary manslaughter	Up to 20 years in prison (parole eligibility cannot exceed more than half the maximum sentence)
Third degree murder	Up to 40 years in prison (parole eligibility cannot exceed more than half the maximum sentence)
Second degree murder if the defendant was under 15	Life (minimum of at least 20 years)
Second degree murder if the defendant was 15-17	Life (minimum of at least 30 years)
Second degree murder	Life without parole (eligible for commutation by governor provided there is a unanimous recommendation by the Board of Pardons)
First degree murder if the defendant was under 15	Life (minimum of at least 25 years)
First degree murder if the defendant was under 15-17	Life (minimum of at least 35 years)
First degree murder	Death (aggravating circumstances) or life without parole (eligible for commutation by governor provided there is a unanimous recommendation by the Board of Pardons)

== See also ==
- Law of Pennsylvania
