= Exoneration =

Reversal of a criminal conviction

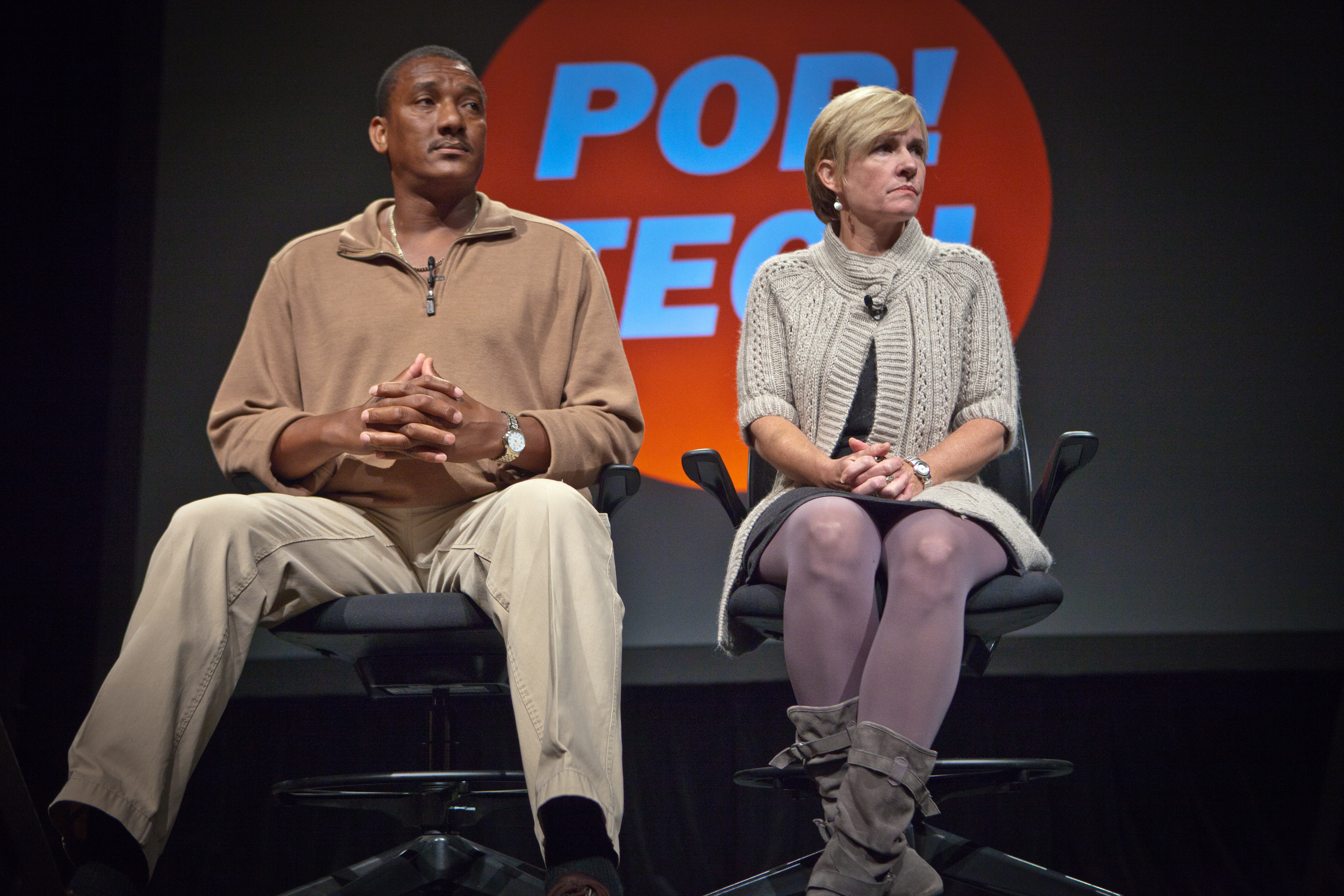
Ronald Cotton with Jennifer Thompson-Cannino at PopTech 2010

Exoneration occurs when the conviction for a crime is reversed, either through demonstration of innocence, a flaw in the conviction, or otherwise. Attempts to exonerate individuals are particularly controversial in death penalty cases, especially where new evidence is put forth after the execution has taken place. The transitive verb, "to exonerate" can also mean to informally absolve one from blame. Definitions vary among legal systems and researchers, and terms including exoneration, wrongful conviction, miscarriage of justice, and innocence are sometimes used inconsistently or interchangeably. Some researchers distinguish exoneration from the reversal of a conviction on ordinary appeal, limiting the term to cases in which a final conviction was subsequently overturned through a post-conviction re-examination.

The term "exoneration" also is used in civil and nonlegal circumstances to indicate that a person once believed to have engaged in wrongdoing has been demonstrated not to have so engaged; and in criminal law to indicate a surety, i.e. bail bond has been satisfied, completed, and exonerated. In the latter case, the judge orders the bond exonerated; the clerk of court time stamps the original bail bond power and indicates exonerated as the judicial order.

== Based on DNA evidence ==
DNA evidence is a relatively new instrument of exoneration. The first convicted defendant from a United States prison to be released on account of DNA testing was David Vasquez, who had been convicted of homicide, in 1989. Subsequently, DNA evidence was used to exonerate a number of persons either on death row or serving lengthy prison sentences. As of October 2003, the number of states authorizing individuals to request DNA testing on their behalf had increased from two to thirty. Access to DNA testing then and now can vary greatly by degree; post-conviction tests can be difficult to acquire. Organizations such as the Innocence Project and Centurion are particularly concerned with the exoneration of those who have been convicted based on weak or faulty evidence, regardless of DNA evidence. In October 2003, prosecutors of criminal cases must approve the defendant's request for DNA testing in certain cases.

Monday, April 23, 2007, Jerry Miller became the 200th person in the United States exonerated through the use of DNA evidence. There is a national campaign in support of the formation of state Innocence Commissions, statewide entities that identify causes of wrongful convictions and develop state reforms that can improve the criminal justice system.

As of 2020, 375 people in the U.S. have been exonerated based on DNA tests. In nearly half of these cases, faulty forensics contributed to the original conviction.

Per February 4, 2014 NPR article, Laura Sullivan cited Samuel Gross, a University of Michigan law professor stating that exonerations were on the rise, and not just because of DNA evidence. Only one-fifth of the exonerations in 2013 relied on newly tested DNA, a little less than a third of exonerations occurred due to further investigating by law enforcement agencies.

According to a 2020 study, DNA exonerations in rape cases "strongly suggest that the wrongful-conviction rate is significantly higher among black individuals than white individuals."

DNA evidence accounts for only a portion of exonerations. A 2026 study of European exonerations found that DNA evidence contributed to 20 of 91 exonerations (22%) in which an actual crime had occurred, with others following re-evaluation of witness testimony, forensic evidence, procedural errors, or other evidence. In 54 of those cases (59.3%) identification of another perpetrator played a role, while in 36 cases (40%) the convicted person's innocence was established without definitively identifying the actual offender.

== Contributing factors ==
Research on wrongful convictions has identified recurring factors contributing to convictions that later lead to exoneration. These include false confessions, false or misleading forensic evidence, flaws in processes for eyewitness identification, perjury or false accusations, and official misconduct by officials such as police or prosecutors.

A 2026 analysis of 144 cases in the European Registry of Exonerations (EUREX) found the most frequent contributing factor documented was false confessions, which occurred in 35.4% of cases of later exoneration. The authors contrasted this with data from the United States' National Registry of Exonerations, where perjury or false accusations were substantially more prevalent, and false confessions accounted for a smaller proportion of cases. It was noted, however, that false-confession cases might be overrepresented in EUREX due to biases originating from characteristics of its founders. Multiple contributing factors can occur with respect to the same wrongful conviction.

== Exonerees after exoneration ==
Exoneration may end or nullify a criminal conviction, but cannot restore time lost to wrongful imprisonment, which can have lasting social, economic, and psychological consequences for exonerees, particularly those who spent lengthy periods in prison or on death row. After release, exonerees may experience psychological trauma, disrupted family and social relationships, loss of employment and earning capacity, and difficulties obtaining housing and other services. Counterintuitively, they may also lack forms of prisoner reentry assistance, which is often available to people released after completing valid sentences through parole or other correctional programs. The process of being exonerated often takes many years. Analysis of 144 European exonerations found a mean interval of 11.8 years between conviction and exoneration, with exonerees averaging 6.4 years wrongfully incarcerated. Some exonerations also occur posthumously, either because the process remains underway when the exonerated person dies, or because evidence with which to meaningfully pursue exoneration is not developed until after the person's death.

After exoneration, some exonerees publicly have joined or formed organizations like Witness to Innocence and the Innocence Project to tell their stories as a form of advocacy against the death penalty, prison conditions, or other criminal justice issues.

== See also ==
- National Registry of Exonerations
- List of exonerated death row inmates
- List of wrongful convictions in the United States
