= State Correctional Institution – Rockview =

Prison in Pennsylvania, United States

Coordinates: 40.8507°N 77.7777°W

- Interactive map of State Correctional Institution – Rockview
- Location: Benner Township, Centre County, Pennsylvania, USA
- Status: Closed
- Security class: Medium-security
- Opened: 1915
- Closed: February 2026
- Managed by: Pennsylvania Department of Corrections

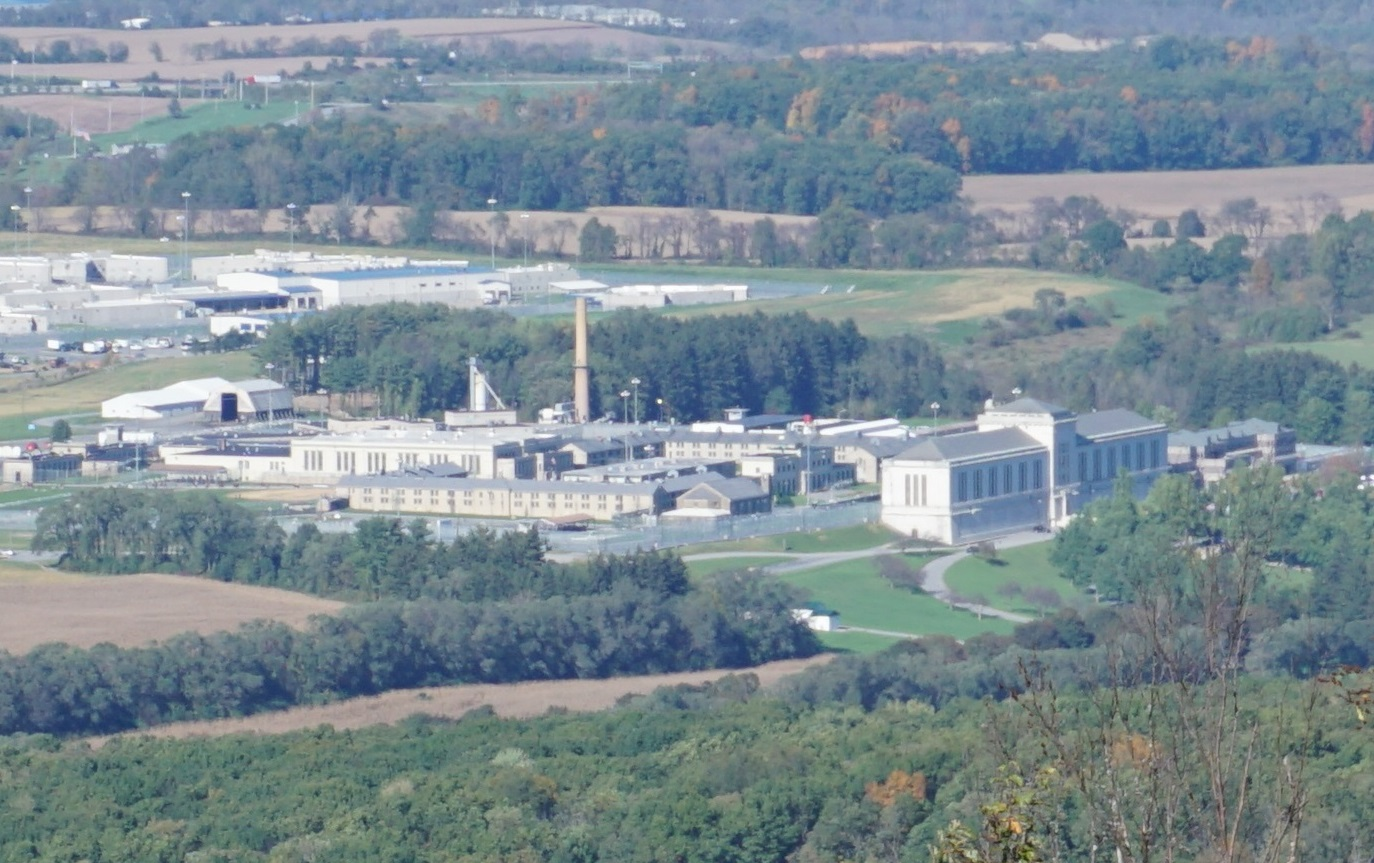
SCI Rockview -- SCI Benner Township can be seen in the background

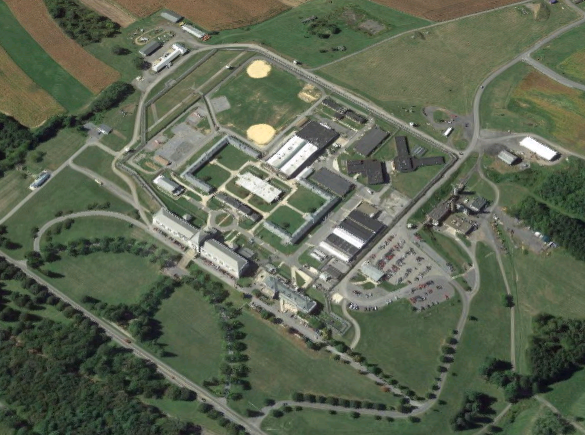
SCI Rockview overhead view

The State Correctional Institution – Rockview (SCI Rockview) was a Pennsylvania Department of Corrections prison located in Centre County, Pennsylvania, 5 miles (8.0 km) away from Bellefonte. The facility is mostly in Benner Township, while a portion of the prison grounds extends into College Township.

SCI Rockview, which began construction in 1912 and was completed in 1915, was intended to replace both Eastern State Penitentiary in Philadelphia as well as Western State Penitentiary in Pittsburgh. Instead it became a branch prison of Western housing lesser security risk prisoners employed in the extensive farm program outside the gates. Rockview then became a medium-security institution for men. Pennsylvania's execution chamber was located on the grounds of Rockview; however, there was no "death row" there. Condemned prisoners are transported to Rockview from death rows in maximum security prisons across the state several days before their scheduled execution.

SCI – Benner Township was constructed adjacent to SCI Rockview in 2010.

In September, 2025, Governor Josh Shapiro announced a decision to close Rockview, with the process to begin immediately. Rockview officially closed down in February 2026.

== History ==
Construction of Rockview began in 1912, and the prison opened three years later in 1915. It was designed by architect John T. Windrim. In 1913, the Pennsylvania State Legislature approved electrocution and the electric chair took the place of the gallows.

At that time, the Pennsylvania State Legislature selected the new Western Penitentiary in Centre County, now known as Rockview, as the location of the chair. Neither the chair nor the institution were ready for occupancy until 1915.

Between 1915 and 1962, 348 men and two women died in Pennsylvania's electric chair. The first woman to die in the electric chair was Irene Crawford Schroeder aka Shrader February 23, 1931. In 1972, the Pennsylvania Supreme Court decision Commonwealth v. Bradley invalidated the administration of the death penalty. In 1974, Pennsylvania drafted new capital punishment legislation, but it was once again invalidated in 1977. The next year, yet again, new capital punishment legislation was drafted and signed into law.

On November 29, 1990, amidst debate over whether electrocution was cruel and unusual punishment, the Pennsylvania State Legislature barred further such executions and lethal injection was approved.

The film On the Yard (1978) was filmed entirely at this prison and used actual inmates as extras in the film. It stars John Heard, Thomas Waites, and Mike Kellin.

== Execution chamber ==
Since June 1997, the state execution chamber has been located in a two-story former field hospital located on the prison grounds outside of the perimeter of the main Rockview SCI facility. The hospital was renovated into a maximum security building that houses the execution chamber and a holding area for death row inmates. This allows officials to prepare for and implement an execution without disrupting the operations of the main Rockview facility. In addition, witnesses do not have to enter the main facility to view an execution. The renovated building gained three cells with cell furniture, floor covering, telephones, an electronic monitoring system, and locking mechanisms. Materials transferred from the previous location include the bullet-proof glass room divider, the tables, and the chairs. The first floor houses the death chamber, while the second floor contains offices for other prison-related operations. It is nicknamed the "Death House".

Only three people have been executed in Pennsylvania since the resumption of capital punishment in 1976. All three prisoners waived their right to appeal, and all executions took place at Rockview. The first was Keith Zettlemoyer in May 1995, followed by Leon Moser in August 1995, and then Gary M. Heidnik in July 1999.

== Notable prisoners ==
Inmate Name	Register Number	Status	Details
Juan Covington	GN5163	Serving a life sentence.	Murdered 3 people.
Rockne Warren Newell	MA6444	Serving a life sentence.	Perpetrator of the 2013 Ross Township Municipal Building shooting.
Antonio Rodriguez	KR3631	Serving 4 life sentences.	Also known as the "Kensington Strangler" who was convicted of raping and murdering 3 women in 2010.
Sean Rooney	GW2091	Eight years.	Aggravated assault; died before sentence was completed. Best known as the discoverer and manager of Lester "Beetlejuice" Green.

- George Feigley, escaped from SCI-Rockview in 1976.

== See also ==
- List of Pennsylvania state prisons
