= Capital punishment debate in the United States =

The debate over capital punishment in the United States existed as early as the colonial period. As of April 2022, it remains a legal penalty within 28 states, the federal government, and military criminal justice systems. The states of Colorado, Delaware, Illinois, Maryland, New Hampshire, Virginia, and Washington abolished the death penalty within the last decade alone.

Gallup, Inc. has monitored support for the death penalty in the United States since 1937 by asking "Are you in favor of the death penalty for a person convicted of murder?" Opposition to the death penalty peaked in 1966, with 47% of Americans opposing it; by comparison, 42% supported the death penalty and 11% had "no opinion." The death penalty increased in popularity throughout the 1970s and 1980s, when crime went up and politicians campaigned on fighting crime and drugs; in 1994, the opposition rate was less than 20%, less than in any other year. Since then, the crime rate has fallen and opposition to the death penalty has strengthened again. In the October 2021 poll, 54% of respondents said they were in favor and 43% were opposed.

== History ==
=== Colonial period ===
Abolitionists gathered support for their claims from writings by European Enlightenment philosophers such as Montesquieu, Voltaire (who became convinced the death penalty was cruel and unnecessary) and Bentham. In addition to various philosophers, many members of Quakers, Mennonites and other peace churches opposed the death penalty as well. Perhaps the most influential essay for the anti-death penalty movement was Cesare Beccaria's 1767 essay, On Crimes and Punishment. Beccaria's strongly opposed the state's right to take lives and criticized the death penalty as having very little deterrent effect. After the American Revolution, influential and well-known Americans, such as Thomas Jefferson, Benjamin Rush, and Benjamin Franklin made efforts to reform or abolish the death penalty in the United States. All three joined the Philadelphia Society for Alleviating the Miseries of Public Prisons, which opposed capital punishment. Following colonial times, the anti-death penalty movement has risen and fallen throughout history. In Against Capital Punishment: Anti-Death Penalty Movement in America, Herbert H. Haines describes the presence of the anti-death penalty movement as existing in four different eras.

=== First abolitionist era, mid-to-late 19th century ===
The anti-death penalty movement began to pick up pace in the 1830s and many Americans called for abolition of the death penalty. Anti-death penalty sentiment rose as a result of the Jacksonian era, which condemned gallows and advocated for better treatment of orphans, criminals, poor people, and the mentally ill. In addition, this era also produced various enlightened individuals who were believed to possess the capacity to reform deviants.

Although some called for complete abolition of the death penalty, the elimination of public hangings was the main focus. Initially, abolitionists opposed public hangings because they threatened public order, caused sympathy for the condemned, and were bad for the community to watch. However, after multiple states restricted executions to prisons or prison yards, the anti-death penalty movement could no longer capitalize on the horrible details of execution.

The anti-death penalty gained some success by the end of the 1850s as Michigan, Rhode Island, and Wisconsin passed abolition bills. Abolitionists also had some success in prohibiting laws that placed mandatory death sentences of convicted murderers. However, some of these restrictions were overturned and the movement was declining. Conflict between the North and the South in the run-up to the American Civil War and the Mexican–American War took attention away from the movement. In addition, the anti-gallows groups who were responsible for lobbying for abolition legislation were weak. The groups lacked strong leadership, because most members were involved in advocating for other issues as well, such as slavery abolishment and prison reform. Members of anti-gallows groups did not have enough time, energy, or resources to make any substantial steps towards abolition. Thus, the movement declined and remained latent until after the post-Civil War period.

=== Second abolitionist era, late 19th and early 20th centuries ===
The anti-death penalty gained momentum again at the end of the 19th century. Populist and progressive reforms contributed to the reawakened anti-capital punishment sentiment. In addition, a "socially conscious" form of Christianity and the growing support of "scientific" corrections contributed to the movement's success. New York introduced the electric chair in 1890. This method was supposed to be more humane and appease death penalty opponents. However, abolitionists condemned this method and claimed it was inhumane and similar to burning someone on a stake.

In an 1898 op-ed in The New York Times, prominent physician Austin Flint called for the abolition of the death penalty and suggested more criminology-based methods should be used to reduce crime. Anti-death penalty activism of this period was largely state and locally based. An organization called the Anti-Death Penalty League was established Massachusetts in 1897, by Florence Garrettson Spooner. However, national leagues, such as the Anti-capital Punishment Society of America and the Committee on Capital Punishment of the National Committee on Prisons, developed shortly after.

Many judges, prosecutors, and police opposed the abolition of capital punishment. They believed capital punishment held a strong deterrent capacity and that abolishment would result in more violence, chaos, and lynching. Despite opposition from these authorities, ten states banned execution through legislation by the beginning of World War I and numerous others came close. However, many of these victories were reversed and the movement once again died out due to World War I and the economic problems which followed.

The American Civil Liberties Union, however, developed in 1925 and proved influential. The group focused on educating the public about the moral and pragmatic trouble of the death penalty. They also organized campaigns for legislative abolition and developed a research team which looked into empirical evidence surrounding issues such as death penalty deterrence and racial discrimination within the capital punishment process. Although the organization had little success when it came to abolition, they gathered a multitude of members and financial support for their cause. Many of their members and presidents were well-known prison wardens, attorneys, and academic scholars. These influential people wrote articles and pamphlets that were given out across the nation. They also gave speeches. Along with other social movements of the time, however, the group lost momentum and attention due to the Great Depression and World War II.

=== Third abolitionist era, mid-20th century ===
The movement in 1950s and 1960s shifted focus from legislation to the courts. Although public opinion remained in favour of execution (aside from during the mid-1960s when pro and anti opinions were roughly equal), judges and jurors executed fewer people than they did in the 1930s. The decline in executions gave strength to various new anti-capital punishment organizations. Among these groups were: a California-based Citizens Against Legalized Murder, the Ohio Committee to Abolish Capital Punishment, the New Jersey Council to Abolish Capital Punishment, California's People Against Capital Punishment, the New York Committee to Abolish Capital Punishment, the Oregon Council to Abolish the Death Penalty, and the national Committee to Abolish the Federal Death Penalty. In addition to growing organizations, the movement also profited from growing European abolishment of the death penalty and from the controversial executions of Barbara Graham and Caryl Chessman.

Success mounted in the late 1950s as Alaska, Hawaii, and Delaware abolished capital punishment. Oregon, Iowa and Vermont followed their leads in the 1960s. Many other states added laws that restricted the use of the death penalty except in cases of extreme serious offenses. Abolitionists began to strongly challenge the constitutionality of the death penalty in the 1960s. Lawyers from the American Civil Liberties Union and from the NAACP Legal Defense and Educational Fund launched a major campaign challenging the death penalty's constitutionality and insisted a moratorium for all executions while it was in process. The United States executed zero people from 1968 to 1976. The anti-death penalty movement's biggest victory of this time period was the Supreme Court Case, Furman v. Georgia, of 1972. The Supreme Court found the current state of the death penalty unconstitutional due to its "arbitrary and discriminatory manner" of application. The court, however, left states with the option to revamp their laws and make them more constitutional. Twenty eight states did just that and the court eventually allowed the death penalty again through a series of cases in 1976, collectively known as Gregg v. Georgia.

=== Contemporary anti-death penalty movement ===
The anti-death penalty movement rose again in response to the reinstatement of capital punishment in many states. In the courts, the movement's response has yielded certain limitations on the death penalty's application. For example, juveniles, the mentally ill, and the intellectually disabled can no longer be executed. However, the Supreme Court also made it more difficult to allege racial discrimination within the capital punishment process.

During this era, the movement diversified its efforts beyond those of litigation and lawyers, to include a wide range of organizations that attacked the death penalty legislatively. Some of the most influential organizations who continue to work against capital punishment today include Amnesty International USA, the American Civil Liberties Union, the NAACP Legal Defense and Education Fund, and the National Coalition to Abolish the Death Penalty. The works of these organizations have brought about various restrictions on the use of capital punishment at the state level, including several statewide moratoriums and bans on capital punishment. As a result, some scholars consider the American death penalty to be relatively vulnerable in this contemporary period.

Through both litigation and activism, the anti-death penalty movement has specifically targeted lethal injection as an unacceptable method of execution. By pressuring pharmaceutical manufacturers and raising awareness about protracted, painful, or "botched" execution attempts, activists have achieved some success at limiting the number of executions carried out. Contemporary activism and advocacy has also highlighted the possibility of executing innocent people, an issue that has gained salience as DNA testing has established the innocence of several death-row convicts. The Innocence Project has gained widespread recognition for its efforts to clear convictions using DNA evidence. Finally, many contemporary arguments focus on the greater cost of the death penalty compared to alternate sentences, which has attracted strong support in some state legislatures.

Rather than possessing leaders and members who are possible beneficiaries of the movement's success, the anti-death penalty movement is composed of "moral entrepreneurs" who speak up for those who are under threat of being executed. Membership is not as strong as those of mass movements because it is often composed of "paper membership," which means members are with a group that represents other issues as well or members are involved in multiple other issue-oriented projects.

==== Public opinion ====
In a poll completed by Gallup in October 2009, 65% of Americans supported the death penalty for persons convicted of murder, while 31% were against and 5% did not have an opinion. Since then, support for the death penalty has drastically fallen and opposition has risen. In Gallup's 2021 poll, only 54% of Americans said they were in favor the death penalty for those convicted of murder, down 10 percent from 2009. Those who said they are not in favor rose to 43%, up 12 percent from 2009.

In a 2010 poll completed by Gallup, 49% of Americans thought the death penalty was the better punishment for murder over life imprisonment, while 46% said life imprisonment was a better punishment. In an updated version of the poll, a mere 36% of Americans said that the death penalty was the better punishment for murder, while 60% said life imprisonment was better.

In 2014, Gallup asked respondents what their reason was for supporting or opposing the death penalty. The most popular reason for supporters was "an eye for an eye/they took a life/fits the crime" with 35% of death penalty supporters holding this position. The second most popular reasons were "save taxpayers money/cost associated with prison" and "they deserve it", both at 14% of supporters giving this reasoning. Of those who opposed the death penalty the most popular reason was because it's "wrong to take a life" with 40% of those against the death penalty holding this position. The second most popular reasons were that "persons may be wrongly convicted" and "punishment should be left to God/religious belief", both at 17% of those against the death penalty giving this reasoning.

In the U.S., surveys have long shown a majority in favor of capital punishment. An ABC News survey in July 2006 found 65 percent in favour of capital punishment, consistent with other polling since 2000. About half the American public says the death penalty is not imposed frequently enough and 60 percent believe it is applied fairly, according to a Gallup poll from May 2006. Yet surveys also show the public is more divided when asked to choose between the death penalty and life without parole, or when dealing with juvenile offenders. Roughly six in 10 tell Gallup they do not believe capital punishment deters murder and majorities believe at least one innocent person has been executed in the past five years.

As a comparison, in Canada, Australia, New Zealand, Latin America, and Western Europe, the death penalty is a controversial issue. However certain cases of mass murder, terrorism, and child murder occasionally cause short-lived waves of support for restoration, such as the Robert Pickton case, the Greyhound bus beheading, Port Arthur massacre and Bali bombings, though none of these events or similar events actually caused the death penalty to be re-instated. Between 2000 and 2010, support for the return of capital punishment in Canada dropped from 44% to 40%, and opposition to it returning rose from 43% to 46%. The Canadian government currently "has absolutely no plans to reinstate capital punishment." Nonetheless, in a 2011 interview given to Canadian media, Canadian Prime Minister Stephen Harper affirmed his private support for capital punishment by saying, "I personally think there are times where capital punishment is appropriate." According to some polls, as of 2012, 63% of surveyed Canadians believe the death penalty is sometimes appropriate, while 61% said capital punishment is warranted for murder. In Australia, a 2009 poll found that 23% of the public support the death penalty for murder, while a 2014 poll found that 52.5% support the death penalty for fatal terrorist attacks.

In the punishment phase of the federal capital case against Dzhokhar Tsarnaev in 2015 for the Boston Marathon bombing, the convict was given the death penalty. Opinion polls in the state of Massachusetts, where the crime and the trial transpired, "showed that residents overwhelmingly favored life in prison for Mr. Tsarnaev. Many respondents said that life in prison for one so young would be a fate worse than death, and some worried that execution would make him a martyr. But the jurors in his case had to be 'death qualified' — that is, they all had to be willing to impose the death penalty to serve on the jury. So in that sense, the jury was not representative of the state."

== Deterrence and brutalization ==
In regard to capital punishment, deterrence is the notion that the death penalty (for crimes such as murder) may deter other individuals from engaging in crimes of a similar nature, while brutalization is the notion that the death penalty or executions has a brutalizing effect on society, increasing homicides.

In 1962, Supreme Court of California justice Marshall F. McComb, who was later the lone dissenter in People v. Anderson, argued that the death penalty was at least a marginal deterrent to murder. As evidence, McComb gave 14 separate examples from the city of Los Angeles between 1958 and 1961 in which a total of 18 criminals had stated that the death penalty had either deterred them from committing murder or caused them to take precaution to avoid committing murder. In one case, for example, an ex-convict had admitted to his probation officer that he had considered shooting and killing his arresting officer, but changed his mind out of fear of execution.

Orelius Mathew Stewart, an ex-convict, with a long felony record, was arrested March 3, 1960, for attempted bank robbery. He was subsequently convicted and sentenced to the state prison. While discussing the matter with his probation officer, he stated: "The officer who arrested me was by himself, and if I had wanted, I could have blasted him. I thought about it at the time, but I changed my mind when I thought of the gas chamber."

Up until 1975, most studies agreed that executing convicted criminals and publicizing these executions did not significantly deter other individuals from committing similar crimes. In 1975, however, Ehrlich famously contradicted existing social science literature by seemingly proving the validity of the deterrence argument. Although Ehrlich's study appeared to show that executing individuals and publicizing said execution resulted in lower crime rates from the 1930s through the 1960s, his findings drew criticism, due to other researchers' inability to replicate the study and its findings. Since the publication of Ehrlich's controversial findings, studies have been increasingly contradictory. As studies' findings become increasingly contradictory, the validity of the deterrence argument has become even more highly contested. In fact, a 2011 article about the validity of the deterrence effect problematizes previous studies, arguing that econometric estimates of execution deterrence are easily manipulated and, by extension, fallible.

Some research among criminologists indicates a strong professional consensus that the death penalty does not have a deterrent effect on crime. In a 2018 study, 92.6% of criminologists said the death penalty does not deter homicide, compared to 64% of the general public, while only 2% of experts and 32% of the public said it does. A 2009 study similarly found that 88% of criminologists believed death penalty has no detterent effect, 87% believe abolition would not increase murder rates, and 94% find little or no empirical evidence that executions reduce violent crime.

One reason that there is no general consensus on whether or not the death penalty is a deterrent is that it is used so rarely – only about one out of every 300 murders actually results in an execution. In 2005 in the Stanford Law Review, John J. Donohue III, a law professor at Yale with a doctorate in economics, and Justin Wolfers, an economist at the University of Pennsylvania, wrote that the death penalty "is applied so rarely that the number of homicides it can plausibly have caused or deterred cannot reliably be disentangled from the large year-to-year changes in the homicide rate caused by other factors. ... The existing evidence for deterrence ... is surprisingly fragile." Wolfers stated, "If I was allowed 1,000 executions and 1,000 exonerations, and I was allowed to do it in a random, focused way, I could probably give you an answer."

A 2012 report by the National Research Council of the National Academies concluded that studies claiming a deterrent effect, brutalization effect, or no effect on murder rates from the death penalty are fundamentally flawed. Criminologist Daniel Nagin of Carnegie Mellon said: "Nothing is known about how potential murderers actually perceive their risk of punishment." The report concluded: “The committee concludes that research to date on the effect of capital punishment on homicide is not informative about whether capital punishment decreases, increases, or has no effect on homicide rates".

Naci Mocan, an economist at Louisiana State University, authored a study that looked at all 3,054 U.S. counties over death penalty on many different grounds. The study found that each execution prevented five homicides. Emory University law professor Joanna M. Shepherd, who has contributed to multiple studies on capital punishment and deterrence, has said, "I am definitely against the death penalty on lots of different grounds. But I do believe that people respond to incentives." Shepherd found that the death penalty had a deterrent effect only in those states that executed at least nine people between 1977 and 1996. In the Michigan Law Review in 2005, Shepherd wrote, "Deterrence cannot be achieved with a halfhearted execution program."

The question of whether or not the death penalty deters murder usually revolves around the statistical analysis. Studies have produced disputed results with disputed significance. Some studies have shown a positive correlation between the death penalty and murder rates – in other words, they show that where the death penalty applies, murder rates are also high. This correlation can be interpreted in either that the death penalty increases murder rates by brutalizing society, which is known as the brutalization hypothesis, or that higher murder rates cause the state to retain or reintroduce the death penalty. However, supporters and opponents of the various statistical studies, on both sides of the issue, argue that correlation does not imply causation. There is evidence that some of the major studies of capital punishment and deterrence are flawed due to model uncertainty, and that once this is accounted for, little evidence of deterrence remains.

The case for a large deterrent effect of capital punishment has been significantly strengthened since the 1990s, as a wave of sophisticated econometric studies have exploited a newly available form of data, so-called panel data. Most of the recent studies demonstrate statistically a deterrent effect of the death penalty. However, critics claim severe methodological flaws in these studies and hold that the empirical data offer no basis for sound statistical conclusions about the deterrent effect. In 2009, a survey of leading criminologists found that 88% of them did not think capital punishment was an effective deterrent to crime.

Surveys and polls conducted in the last 15 years show that some police chiefs and others involved in law enforcement may not believe that the death penalty has any deterrent effect on individuals who commit violent crimes. In a 1995 poll of randomly selected police chiefs from across the U.S., the officers rank the death penalty last as a way of deterring or preventing violent crimes. They ranked it behind many other forms of crime control including reducing drug abuse and use, lowering technical barriers when prosecuting, putting more officers on the streets, and making prison sentences longer. They responded that a better economy with more jobs would lessen crime rates more than the death penalty. In fact, only one percent of the police chiefs surveyed thought that the death penalty was the primary focus for reducing crime.

In addition to statistical evidence, psychological studies examine whether murderers think about the consequences of their actions before they commit a crime. Most homicides are spur-of-the-moment, spontaneous, emotionally impulsive acts. Murderers do not weigh their options very carefully in this type of setting (Jackson 27). It is very doubtful that killers give much thought to punishment before they kill (Ross 41).

But some say the death penalty must be enforced even if the deterrent effect is unclear, like John McAdams, who teaches political science at Marquette University: "If we execute murderers and there is in fact no deterrent effect, we have killed a bunch of murderers. If we fail to execute murderers, and doing so would in fact have deterred other murders, we have allowed the killing of a bunch of innocent victims. I would much rather risk the former. This, to me, is not a tough call."

Maimonides argued that executing a defendant on anything less than absolute certainty would lead to a slippery slope of decreasing burdens of proof, until we would be convicting merely "according to the judge's caprice." Caprice of various sorts are more visible now with DNA testing, and digital computer searches and discovery requirements opening DA's files. Maimonides' concern was maintaining popular respect for law, and he saw errors of commission as much more threatening than errors of omission.

Cass R. Sunstein and Adrian Vermeule, both of Harvard law school, however, have argued that if there is a deterrent effect it will save innocent lives, which gives a life-life tradeoff. "The familiar problems with capital punishment—potential error, irreversibility, arbitrariness, and racial skew—do not argue in favor of abolition, because the world of homicide suffers from those same problems in even more acute form." They conclude that "a serious commitment to the sanctity of human life may well compel, rather than forbid, that form of punishment." Regarding any attempt to make a utilitarian moral argument for capital punishment, Albert Camus wrote:

Capital punishment is the most premeditated of murders, to which no criminal's deed, however calculated, can be compared. For there to be an equivalency, the death penalty would have to punish a criminal who had warned his victim of the date on which he would inflict a horrible death on him and who, from that moment onward, had confined him at his mercy for months. Such a monster is not to be encountered in private life.

— Reflections on the Guillotine

The extent to which the deterrence argument is well-founded, however, is far from the only interesting and important aspect of this common justification of capital punishment. In fact, current conceptualizations of the deterrence argument are also paramount, insofar as they implicitly operate under the assumption that the media and publicity are integral to shaping individuals' awareness and understandings of capital punishment. In other words, current conceptualizations of the deterrence argument presuppose that most people are made aware of executions through the media's coverage of said executions, which means that the media's selection of executions to cover, as well as the media's coverage of said executions are necessary for the deterrence effect to transpire. In this regard, in contemporary society, the deterrence argument relies upon the implicit understanding that people's understandings and actions – including actions that may deprive an individual of life – are influenced by the media. Although it is increasingly unclear as to whether or not the media's coverage has affected criminal behavior, it is necessary to examine how the media's coverage of executions and, more abstractly, its holistic construction of capital punishment has shaped people's actions and understandings related to this controversial practice.

In a 1992 study of violence in a male prison population, James Gilligan, a former prison mental health service director, wrote: The men I know already feel so spiritually dead that they long for physical death as well. For many, the only means capable of expressing in a final catharsis the rage that is within them, so as to settle at last their accounts with the world, is the fantasy of a shoot-out with the police... If anything, death is a promise of peace, which makes it understandable that executions and capital punishment encourage more murders than they deter.

== Use of the death penalty on plea bargain ==
Supporters of the death penalty, especially those who do not believe in the deterrent effect of the death penalty, say the threat of the death penalty could be used to urge capital defendants to plead guilty, testify against accomplices, or disclose the location of the victim's body. Norman Frink, a senior deputy district attorney in the state of Oregon, considers capital punishment a valuable tool for prosecutors. The threat of death leads defendants to enter plea deals for life without parole or life with a minimum of 30 years – the two other penalties, besides death, that Oregon allows for aggravated murder. In a plea agreement reached with Washington state prosecutors, Gary Ridgway, a Seattle-area man who admitted to 48 murders since 1982, accepted a sentence of life in prison without parole in 2003. Prosecutors spared Ridgway from execution in exchange for his cooperation in leading police to the remains of still-missing victims.

== Botched executions ==
One of the main arguments against the use of capital punishment in the United States is that there has been a long history of botched executions. University of Colorado Boulder Professor Michael L. Radelet described a "botched execution" as an execution that causes the prisoner to suffer for a long period of time before they die.

A study found that at least 34 of the 749 executions carried out in the U.S. between 1977 and 2001, or 4.5%, involved "unanticipated problems or delays that caused, at least arguably, unnecessary agony for the prisoner or that reflect gross incompetence of the executioner". The rate of these "botched executions" remained steady over the period. A study published in The Lancet in 2005 found that in 43% of cases of lethal injection, the blood level of hypnotics in the prisoner was insufficient to ensure unconsciousness. Nonetheless, the Supreme Court ruled in 2008 (Baze v. Rees), again in 2015 (Glossip v. Gross), and a third time in 2019 (Bucklew v. Precythe), that lethal injection does not constitute cruel and unusual punishment.

Opponents to the death penalty note that the lethal injection, the most common method of carrying out the death penalty, can oftentimes cause executed individuals to remain conscious for several minutes after administering the injection, causing them to feel severe pain in their veins. The "three drug cocktail" consists of midazolam, a sedative, vecuronium bromide, a paralytic, and potassium chloride, which stops the heart. Opponents note that the midazolam in particular may mask the executed individual's pain and suffering. Opponents argue that this causes unnecessary pain and suffering on the executed individual and constitutes cruel and unusual punishment in violation of the Eighth Amendment to the United States Constitution.

The following is a short list of examples of botched executions that have occurred in the United States.

- William Kemmler was the first person executed in the electric chair, in 1890. After being pronounced dead after 17 seconds, he was found to be still alive. The current was applied a second time, for two minutes, to complete the death.
- In Arizona, it took Joseph Wood two hours to die after being injected.
- In Alabama, the execution of Doyle Hamm was called off after prison medical staff spent nearly three hours attempting to insert an IV that could be used to administer the lethal injection drugs. In the process, the execution team punctured Hamm's bladder and femoral artery, causing significant bleeding.
- In Florida, Jesse Joseph Tafero had flames burst from his hair during an electrocution.
- Wallace Wilkerson died after 27 minutes in pain after the firing squad failed to shoot him in the heart. Because of this, the constitutionality of the use of the firing squad was questioned. The Supreme Court of the United States affirmed that the firing squad did not violate the Eighth Amendment in the case Wilkerson v. Utah (1879).
- In New Mexico, Thomas Ketchum was decapitated when his body fell through the trap door during his hanging.
- In Mississippi, Jimmy Lee Gray died after being in the gas chamber for nine minutes. During the procedure, Gray thrashed and banged his head against the metal pole behind his head while struggling to breathe.

Austin Sarat, a professor of jurisprudence and political science at Amherst College, in his book Gruesome Spectacles: Botched Executions and America's Death Penalty, found that from 1890 to 2010, 276 executions were botched out of a total of 8,776, or 3.15%, with lethal injections having the highest rate. Sarat writes that between 1980 and 2010 the rate of botched executions was higher than ever: 8.53 percent. Death penalty experts found that 36.8% of all executions attempted or completed in 2022 (all lethal injections) were botched.

In August 2025, Tennessee executed Byron Black, a case that drew criticism from witnesses and legal experts for procedural errors and prolonged delays during the process.

The attemped execution of Christa Pike in September 2026 was the first time someone survived a state-ordered lethal injection procedure after the lethal drug was administered.

== The media and the capital punishment debate ==
The media play a crucial role in the production and reproduction of various cultural discourses, and is imperative to reflexively shaping and being shaped by pervading cultural beliefs and attitudes. In this regard, media messages and, by extension, people's beliefs and attitudes towards practices such as capital punishment may have considerable ramifications for not only convicted criminals, but also for jurors, attorneys, politicians, victims' families, and the broader public debate of capital punishment. Thus, it is imperative to understand how the media's framing of executions has massaged people's understandings and their support of capital punishment, as well as how this framing affects individuals' engagement in criminal activity.

=== Media framing of capital punishment ===
Journalists and producers play integral roles in shaping the media's framing of the death penalty. But frames develop through a wide variety of social actors and stakeholders. In terms of capital punishment, the media's framing of Timothy McVeigh's execution was interactionally accomplished by a variety of people. Specifically, the Federal Bureau of Prisons, which historically shied away from media attention, responded to increased scrutiny through enlisting a media advisory group to help shape the media's framing of McVeigh's execution.

Despite the fact that media frames are ubiquitous, the public is not always cognizant of the particular frames with which they are bombarded. This is largely because the media frames issues in a way that, more often than not, keeps people from fully realizing said frames. For instance, examining the media's coverage of three Nebraskan executions reveals that the death penalty was framed in a particularly positive way, to ensure media coverage would correspond with the public's growing support for capital punishment at the time. This meant that journalists did not focus on the problems or tensions within each case, nor did they ask public officials hard-hitting questions regarding the cases or the death penalty more broadly.

Media frames can dramatically over-simplify complex social issues. More specifically, the media simplifies complex cases by ensuring news stories adhere to generally taken-for-granted, preexisting cultural understandings of capital crimes. More specifically, the media frames capital punishment in a particularly negative and inaccurate way, by almost exclusively covering cases that involve minority offenders, 'worthy' victims, and especially heinous crimes; this is especially true for capital crimes that involve the sexual degradation of women. A 209 thematic content analysis of Associated Press articles finds that the media frames the death penalty in a way that portrays capital punishment as being overly fair, palatable, and simple. To accomplish such discursively positive illustrations of the death penalty and individual executions, journalists frame stories around inmates' choice. In order of popularity, the other common frames journalists use to frame execution and the death penalty pertain to competency, legal procedures, politics, religion, state-assisted suicide, and inmate suffering.

Although most literature shows that in general, the media frames executions and capital punishment favorably by minimizing the complexities of each case, conversely, some studies show that the media frames executions and capital punishment in an overly negative way. Both conditions are achieved through reducing and obscuring the complexities embedded in capital crime cases. Content analyses reveal that The New York Times, The Washington Post, and Associated Press have framed the death penalty negatively by focusing on exceptions that challenge acceptance: innocence of some people convicted of capital crimes, the wrongfully accused and convicted, and convicted individuals' lack of competency.

A formal content analysis of articles in Time, Newsweek, The Progressive, and National Review found that frames used in the left-leaning Progressive and right-wing National Review contributed to each magazine's respective bias. Time and Newsweek, however, were very centrist in their approaches to social issues, including the death penalty. Although these biased frames may seem insignificant, the media's framing of capital punishment has significant implications.

=== Effect on public opinion ===
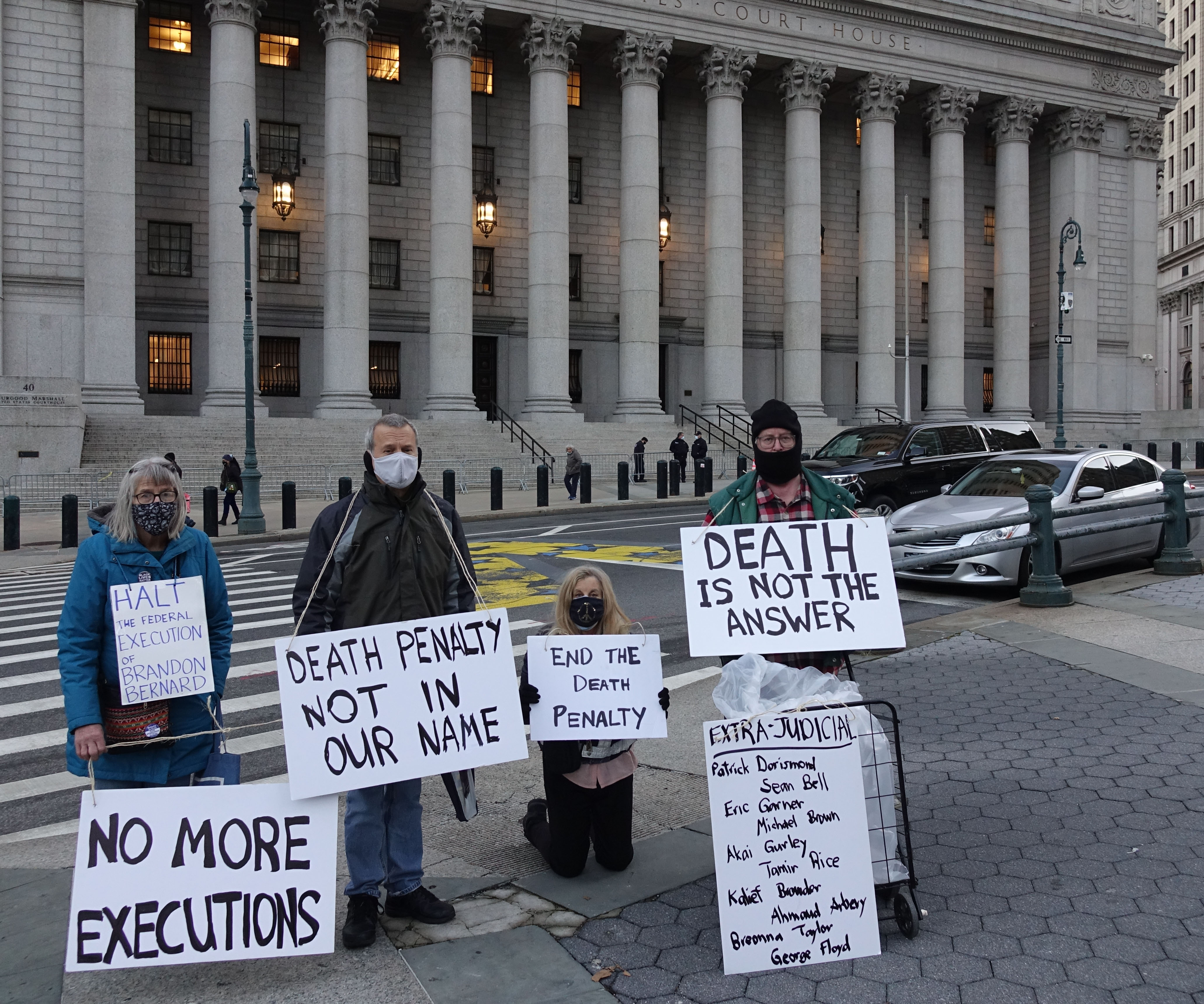
Vigil and protest held against the execution of Brandon Bernard

The media plays a critical role in shaping people's understanding of capital punishment. This is especially true insofar as the media's increased focus on the wrongful convictions of innocent people has resulted in the public becoming less supportive of the death penalty. This finding is supported by more recent studies, including a study involving the analysis of The New York Times articles' contents and the public's opinions on the death penalty. The media's increased focus on innocent people's wrongful convictions, referred to as the 'innocence frame,' has highlighted larger fallibilities within the justice system; it has contributed to a decline in public support of the death penalty. Furthermore, examinations of whether individuals' exposure to press coverage has the ability to alter their understandings of capital punishment reveal that the way in which the media portrays the public's support of capital punishment has bearings on the public's support of capital punishment. More specifically, if the media suggests there is widespread support of the death penalty, something of which the media has been guilty, individuals are more apt to support the death penalty.

It is not only the abstracted 'general public' that is affected by the media's coverage of the death penalty. The media's framing of cases involving the sexual degradation of women affects district attorneys' conceptualizations of said cases, resulting in prosecutors being more apt to pursue the death penalty in cases that involve the sexual mistreatment of women. Cases involving the sexual degradation of women receive much more media attention than others do. Prosecutors are consequently more likely to pursue the death penalty for these crimes, despite the fact that they were, oftentimes, less heinous and gruesome than other capital crimes that did not involve the sexual degradation of women.

News coverage has been found to shape people's understandings of the death penalty and specific cases of legally sanctioned execution. Dramatic television has also been found to have significant bearings on people's understandings of and actions pertaining to capital punishment. Viewing police reality shows and television news programs, one's viewership of crime dramas affects their support of the death penalty. In fact, people's viewership of crime dramas has been associated with completely altering people's pre-existing convictions about the death penalty. More to the point, crime dramas are able to reframe cases in ways that correspond with people's broader ideological beliefs, while challenging and changing their specific beliefs about execution. For example, people who identify as liberals have historically been against the death penalty, but crime dramas like Law and Order reframe criminal cases in a way that associates the death penalty with another closely held liberal value, such as the safety and protection of women. In doing so, crime dramas are able to appeal to and sustain people's ideological beliefs, while simultaneously influencing and altering their stances on the death penalty.

The media's ability to reframe capital punishment and, by extension, affect people's support of capital punishment, while still appealing to their pre-existing ideological beliefs that may traditionally contradict death penalty support is a testament to the complexities embedded in the media's shaping of people's beliefs about capital punishment. How the media shapes people's understandings about capital punishment can be further complicated by the fact that certain mediums shape people's beliefs and subjectivities differently. People exposed to more complex forms of media, such as traditional, hard-hitting news shows, approach the death penalty in more complex, sophisticated ways than people who are exposed to less complex forms of media, including news magazine television shows. Although the medium is the message to some extent, it is also clear that every media form has some bearing – large or small – on the public's support of the death penalty. In this regard, questions must be raised about the ethics of capital punishment in an increasingly media-saturated society. Furthermore, the public and journalists alike must pay increasing attention to new investigative techniques that lend themselves to increased exonerations. These new techniques are illustrative of the fact that oftentimes, the media can play a meaningful role in matters of life and death.

== Racial and gender factors ==
People who oppose capital punishment have argued that the arbitrariness present in its administration make the practice both immoral and unjust. In particular, they point to the systemic presence of racial, socio-economic, geographic, and gender bias in its implementation as evidence of how the practice is illegitimate and in need of suspension or abolition.

Anti-death penalty groups specifically argue that the death penalty is unfairly applied to African Americans. African Americans have constituted 34.5 percent of those persons executed since the death penalty's reinstatement in 1976 and 41 percent of death row inmates as of April 2018, despite representing only 13 percent of the general population in 2010.

The race of the victim has also been demonstrated to affect sentencing in capital cases, with those murders with white victims more likely to result in a death sentence than those with non-white victims. Advocates have been mostly unsuccessful at alleging systemic racial bias at the Supreme Court, due to the necessity of demonstrating individualized bias in a defendant's case.

Approximately 13.5% of death row inmates are of Hispanic or Latino descent, while they make up 17.4% of the general population.

Some attribute the racial disparities in capital punishment to individual factors. According to Craig Rice, a black member of the Maryland state legislature: "The question is, are more people of color on death row because the system puts them there or are they committing more crimes because of unequal access to education and opportunity? The way I was raised, it was always to be held accountable for your actions." Others point to academic studies that suggest African American defendants are more likely to receive a death sentence than defendants of other races, even when controlling for the circumstances of the murder, suggesting that individual factors do not explain the racial disparities.

As of 2017, women account for 1.88% (53 people) of inmates on death row, with men accounting for the other 98.12% (2764). Since 1976, 1.1% (16) of those executed were women. Sexual orientation may also bias sentencing. In 1993, a jury deliberating over the sentencing of convicted murderer Charles Rhines submitted a written question to the judge asking if Rhines might enjoy prison because he was sexually attracted to men. The judge would not answer that question, and the jury sentenced Rhines to death. In 2018, the Supreme Court said that it would not interfere with the execution of Rhines.

== Diminished capacity ==
In the United States, there has been an evolving debate as to whether capital punishment should apply to persons with diminished mental capacity. In Ford v. Wainwright, the Supreme Court held that the Eighth Amendment prohibits the state from carrying out the death penalty on an individual who is insane, and that properly raised issues of execution-time sanity must be determined in a proceeding satisfying the minimum requirements of due process. In Atkins v. Virginia, the Supreme Court addressed whether the Eighth Amendment prohibits the execution of intellectually disabled persons. The Court noted that a "national consensus" had developed against it. While such executions are still permitted for people with marginal retardation, evidence of retardation is allowed as a mitigating circumstance. However, the recent case of Teresa Lewis, the first woman executed in Virginia since 1912, proved to be very controversial because Governor Bob McDonnell refused to commute her sentence to life imprisonment, even though she had an IQ of 70.

== Cost ==
Recent studies show that executing a criminal costs more than life imprisonment does. Many states have found it cheaper to sentence criminals to life in prison than to go through the time-consuming and bureaucratic process of executing a convicted criminal. Donald McCartin, an Orange County, California jurist famous for sending nine men to death row during his career, said that "it's 10 times more expensive to kill criminals than to keep them alive." McCartin's estimate is actually low, according to a June 2011 study by former death penalty prosecutor and federal judge Arthur L. Alarcón, and law professor Paula Mitchell. According to Alarcón and Mitchell, California has spent $4 billion on the death penalty since 1978, and death penalty trials are 20 times more expensive than trials seeking a sentence of life in prison without possibility of parole. Studies in other states show similar patterns.

== Wrongful execution ==
Capital punishment is often opposed on the grounds that innocent people will inevitably be executed. In a 2014 study carried out by National Academy of Sciences, it was found that had all 7,482 defendants who were sentenced to death in the United States from en January 1973 through December 2004 remained on death row indefinitely, at least 4.1% of them would've eventually been legally exonerated. This statistic has often been misinterpreted to claim that at least 4.1% of death row inmates are actually innocent.

The actual study includes both former death row inmates who otherwise would've had their sentences commuted or reduced to appeal and death row inmates who were actually guilty, but legally exonerated. The study found that death row inmates were substantially more likely to be exonerated than others. Many exonerations were of death inmates whose sentences had been commuted or reduced on appeal. Since they were no longer at the risk of execution, their cases received far less scrutiny than those who remained on death row.

Capital defendants who are removed from death row but not exonerated—typically because their sentences are reduced to life imprisonment—no longer receive the extraordinary level of attention that is devoted to death row inmates. If they are in fact innocent, they are much less likely to be exonerated than if they had remained on death row. As a result, the proportion of death-sentenced inmates who are exonerated understates the rate of false convictions among death sentences because the intensive search for possible errors is largely abandoned once the threat of execution is removed.

Supporters of capital punishment say that the lives of the innocent death row inmates have to be weighed against the far more numerous innocent people whose lives can be saved if the murderers are deterred by the prospect of being executed or are prevented from killing again by their executions.

Between 1973 and 2005, 123 death row inmates or former death row inmates in 25 states were released from prison when new evidence of their innocence emerged. How many of these exonerations are cases of actual innocence rather than technical exonerations of the defendants due to legal issues in their cases that allow their convictions to be legally quashed is disputed. After his exoneration, Jay C. Smith lost multiple civil suits against those involved in his conviction. An appellate court stated, "Our confidence in Smith's convictions for the murder of Susan Reinert and her two children is not the least bit diminished." In its ruling, the justices went over evidence that tied Smith to the murders. For example, he had written a letter to his wife, asking her to dispose of pieces of incriminating evidence against him. Smith was not retried after it was determined that the level of prosecutorial misconduct in his case was so extreme that to retry him would amount to double jeopardy.

In 2006, DNA tests proved the guilt of former death row inmate Timothy Hennis, who had been acquitted in 1989 of the Eastburn family murders. Hennis, who was in the U.S. Army at the time, was recalled, retried by a military court for the murders under dual sovereignty. In 2010, Hennis was convicted of the murders and sentenced to death, thus overturning his exoneration. In 2022, DNA testing indicated that former Florida death row inmate Robert Earl Hayes, who was now in prison for another murder in New York, was actually guilty of the 1990 murder for which he had been acquitted at a retrial in 1999.

Some controversial cases have been re-investigated following the execution by state authorities, such as post-conviction DNA testing ordered by Mark Warner of evidence in the Roger Keith Coleman case in Virginia and reviewing the forensic evidence in the Cameron Todd Willingham case in Texas. Coleman's guilt was confirmed beyond any doubt, whereas a review of Willingham's case was inconclusive. Another issue is the quality of the defense in a case where the accused has a public defender. The competence of the defense attorney "is a better predictor of whether or not someone will be sentenced to death than the facts of the crime."

In 2015, the Justice Department and the FBI formally acknowledged that nearly every examiner in an FBI forensic squad overstated forensic hair matches for two decades before the year 2000. 26 out of 28 forensic examiners overstated evidence of forensic hair matches in 268 trials reviewed, and 95% of the overstatements favored the prosecution. Those cases involve 32 cases in which defendants were sentenced to death.

== See also ==
- Outline of capital punishment
