= Race and capital punishment in the United States =

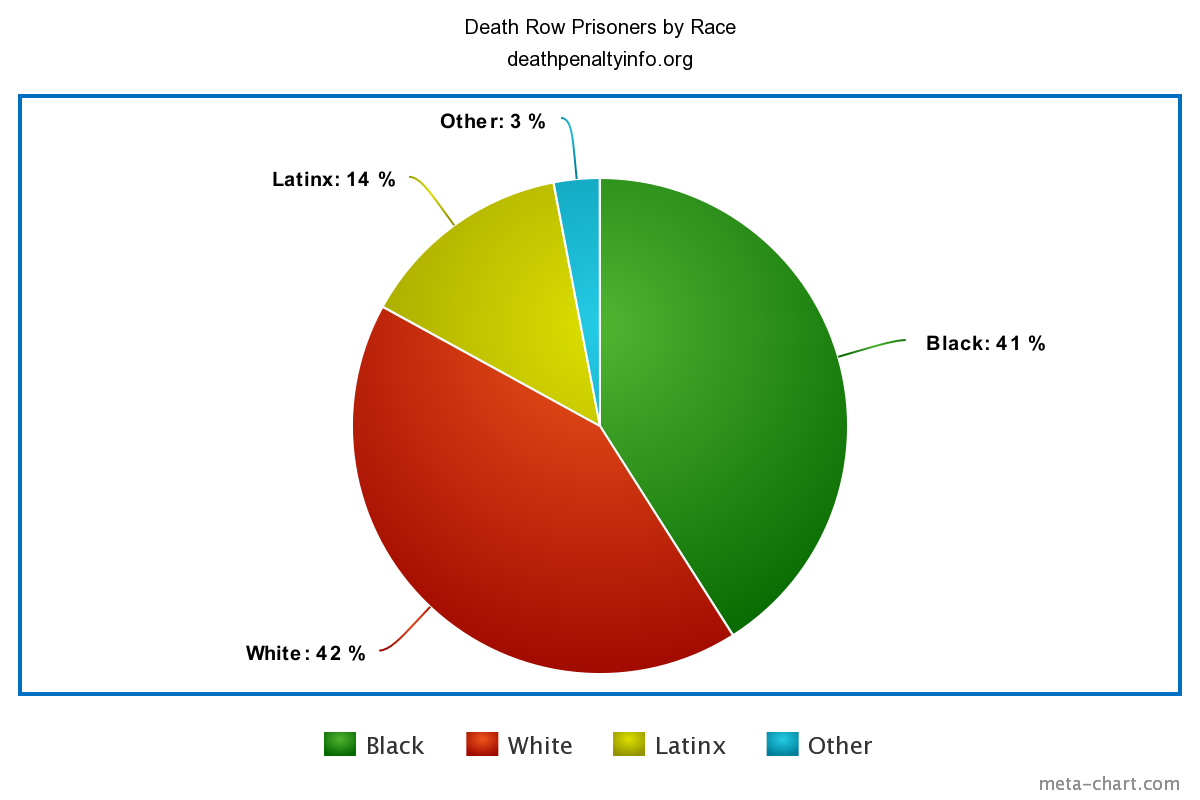
Racial demographic of death row inmates in the U.S. (2022)

The relationship between race and capital punishment in the United States has been studied extensively. As of 2014, 42 percent of those on death row in the United States were Black. As of October 2002, there were 12 executions of White defendants where the murder victim was Black, however, there were 178 executed defendants who were Black with a White murder victim. Since then, the number of white defendants executed where the murder victim was black has increased to just 21 (less than 1.36 percent of all executions), whereas the number of Black defendants executed where the murder victim was White has increased to 299 (nearly 19.4 percent of all executions). 54 percent of people wrongfully convicted and sentenced to death in the United States are black.

Approximately 13.5% of death row inmates are of Hispanic or Latino descent. In 2019, individuals identified as Hispanic and Latino Americans accounted for 5.5% of homicides. Hispanic and Latino Americans make up 19% of the total US population.

Approximately 1.81% of death row inmates are of Asian descent. Asian Americans make up 7% of the total US population.

== Executions by race and race of victim ==
Since 1991, the NAACP Legal Defense and Educational Fund has produced quarterly reports containing statistics related to capital punishment in the United States. The reports include a breakdown of the death row population by race, the race of those executed, as well as the race of the victims in each case.

=== White defendant, white victim ===
The number of white defendants executed for killing a white victim remains the highest percentage out of all racial combinations. As of January 2022, 796 white people had been executed for killing a white victim, making up 51.69 percent of all 1,540 executions. The percentage has remained consistent since 2000, when it was at 51.85 percent, and in 2010, at 52.52 percent.

=== Black defendant, white victim ===
The number of black defendants executed for killing a white victim remains the second highest percentage out of all racial combinations. As of January 2022, 297 black people had been executed for killing a white victim, making up 19.29 percent of all executions. The percentage has decreased in recent years, with it being 24.31 percent in 2000, and 20.44 percent in 2010. However, the percentage drop is less between 2010 and 2020 than it was between 2000 and 2010.

=== Black defendant, black victim ===
The number of black defendants executed for killing a black victim is lower than the number of black defendants executed for killing a white victim. As of January 2022, 181 black people had been executed for killing a black victim, making up 11.75 percent of all executions. Robert Wayne Williams was the first black person to be executed for killing a black victim since the reinstatement of capital punishment in 1976.

=== White defendant, black victim ===
Executions of white defendants for killing black victims are rare. The number of white people executed for killing a black person is significantly lower than all other racial combinations. As of January 2022, just 21 white people had been executed for killing a black victim, making up only 1.36 percent of all executions. While the percentage is slightly higher than what it was in 2010 (1.22 percent) it is lower than what it was in 2000 (1.69 percent).

== Studies ==
=== Baldus ===
In 1983, David Baldus co-authored a study that found that capital punishment in Georgia since the decision in Furman v. Georgia was handed down in 1972 had been applied unevenly across race. Specifically, his and his colleagues' study found that only 15 out of 246 murder cases (6 percent) where the victim was black resulted in a death sentence, as compared with 85 out of 348 (24 percent) of such cases when the victim was white. This study led to Warren McCleskey's death sentence being challenged due to allegations that it was racially biased. Those allegations resulted in the Supreme Court's 1987 decision in McCleskey v. Kemp that statistical evidence of bias in the criminal justice system is insufficient to overturn an individual's sentence. In 1998, Baldus published another study which concluded that black defendants in certain types of murder cases in Philadelphia were almost four times as likely to be sentenced to death than were their white counterparts.

=== Kleck ===
In 1981, Gary Kleck published a literature review that declared that all states, except the Southern United States, found that African Americans were less likely than white Americans to be sentenced to death or executed. The review also found that cases with black victims were less likely than those with white victims to result in the death sentence, possibly as a result of the devaluing of black crime victims.

=== Radelet ===
A 1981 study by Michael Radelet found that murder cases involving white victims were more likely to result in a death sentence than were those involving black victims, mainly because those accused of murdering whites were more likely to be indicted for first-degree murder. The same study found that after controlling for the race of the victim, there was no clear evidence that the race of the defendant predicted how likely they were to receive a death sentence.

=== Dwayne Smith ===
A 1987 study by M. Dwayne Smith of Tulane University found a racial bias in capital punishment cases in Louisiana, but only with regard to the race of the victim, not the offender.

=== Ekland-Olson ===
A 1988 study by Sheldon Ekland-Olson found that in the first decade after Furman, criminal cases in Texas involving white victims were more likely to result in a death sentence than those involving either black or Hispanic victims.

=== Government Accountability Office ===
A 1990 Government Accountability Office analysis of 28 studies, in 82 percent of these studies, found that murder cases with white victims were more likely than those with black victims to result in a death sentence. The report described this relationship as "remarkably consistent across data sets, states, data collection methods, and analytic techniques."

=== Sorensen & Wallace ===
A 1995 study by Jonathan Sorensen and Donald H. Wallace found evidence of a racial bias in capital punishment in Missouri, mainly in regards to the race of the victim. The study found that cases with white victims were more likely to result in death sentences, and that cases with black victims were less likely to result in such sentences. The study also reported that these disparities were largest when "prosecutors and jurors are freed from the seriousness of the cases to consider other factors." A 1999 study by the same authors found that murder cases with black defendants and white victims were more likely than those with any other combination of defendant and victim races to "result in first-degree murder charges, to be served notice of aggravating circumstances, and to proceed to capital trial."

=== Eberhardt ===
A 2006 study led by Jennifer Eberhardt found that even after numerous other factors were controlled for, defendants who looked more stereotypically black in death penalty cases with white victims were more likely to be sentenced to death. People tend to see Black physical traits as directly related to criminality. The synthesis supported a strong race of victim influence.

=== Alesina and La Ferrara ===
A 2014 study by Alberto Alesina and Eliana La Ferrara found evidence of racial bias in capital sentencing in that error rates tended to be higher in capital cases involving minority defendants and white victims. However, this pattern was only seen in Southern states.

=== Butler et al ===
A study by Butler et al published in 2018 failed to replicate the findings of earlier studies that had concluded that white Americans are more likely to support the death penalty if informed that it is largely applied to black Americans; according to the authors, their findings "may result from changes since 2001 in the effects of racial stimuli on white attitudes about the death penalty or their willingness to express those attitudes in a survey context."

== Southern Racism Affecting the Enforcement of Capital Punishment During the Jim Crow Era ==
=== Societal Biases Within Jurisdictions ===
Racial and ethnic disparities in the employment of the death sentence have been significant in scope over the long arc of American history. The main cause is due to the pervasive societal prejudice in southern counties.

More than twice as many people were put to death in the South between 1866 and 1945 as there were in the Northeast. Local law enforcement and segregated juries continued to be pillars of racial discipline for a century after the Civil War.

Research demonstrates that black Americans' executions closely resemble lynchings, if only because killing a white person while black increases the likelihood of receiving the death penalty by a factor of up to seven. Another demonstration of societal prejudice is when four Atlanta police officers visited Rosa South's house in 1940 and took her 16-year-old son, Quintar South, away to be interrogated. Ten days later, a newspaper revealed that an officer had used an electric iron to torture the child in order to coerce a confession. This case highlights three aspects of the history of police torture of African Americans which inevitably led to biased punishment. First, juries in the South declined to convict police officers accused of engaging in this type of racial violence. Next, African American media, witnesses, and victims questioned police torture. Finally, white southern elites criticized police torture techniques, albeit ineffectively.

This exemplifies how Southern racial culture profoundly influenced the application of the death penalty and discrimination against African Americans during the Jim Crow era, attributable to societal biases.

=== Violence's Link Between Capital Punishment and African Americans ===
Due to the link between capital punishment and African Americans in the United States, violence had a large impact on the death sentence.

There is ample proof that white supremacists exploited violence and made lynching a public spectacle to gain total control over the black population during the Jim Crow era. After liberation, lynching took on the role of whipping as a public display of the unbridled power of white people over black people in the South. The well-defined and extensive pattern of racial violence in the South can be helpfully explained by the Wolfgang and Ferracuti theory of subcultural violence. A complex system of standards, viewpoints, and behaviors reflecting a compelling theme of violence is necessary for the establishment of a subculture.

A prominent example of this violence is the case of Ed Johnson, who died at the hands of a white lynch mob on March 19, 1906. In truth, a lynch mob killed Mr. Johnson, shot him, and had his body dismembered. Additionally, his attorneys frequently received threats of murder. Nearly 5,000 lynchings are thought to have occurred in the South between 1882 and 1968. Lynching was a kind of racial prejudice and bigotry that aimed to prove that people who were white were superior to people who were black. Essentially, violence and lynching were tactics employed to uphold racial caste divisions and put black individuals in a subservient position.

Due to the numerous atrocities that Southern racial culture perpetrated against African Americans throughout the Jim Crow era, extreme implications came to fruition. One of the most important of these implications is the tendency of violence, which significantly influenced the use of the death penalty against African Americans.

== See also ==
- Outline of capital punishment
