= Wringe =

Wringe is a surname. Notable people with the surname include:

- Bill Wringe (born 1970), British philosopher and the author of An Expressive Theory of Punishment
- Colin Wringe (born 1937), British educational theorist
