= Denunciation (disambiguation) =

Denunciation is the action of reporting a person to authorities.

Denunciation may also refer to:

- Denunciation (international law), in the context of a treaty, denunciation or abrogation is the announcement of its termination.
- Denunciation (penology), in sentencing philosophy the disapproval of an act by society that is expressed by the imposition of a sentence
