= Military personnel =

Members of the armed forces

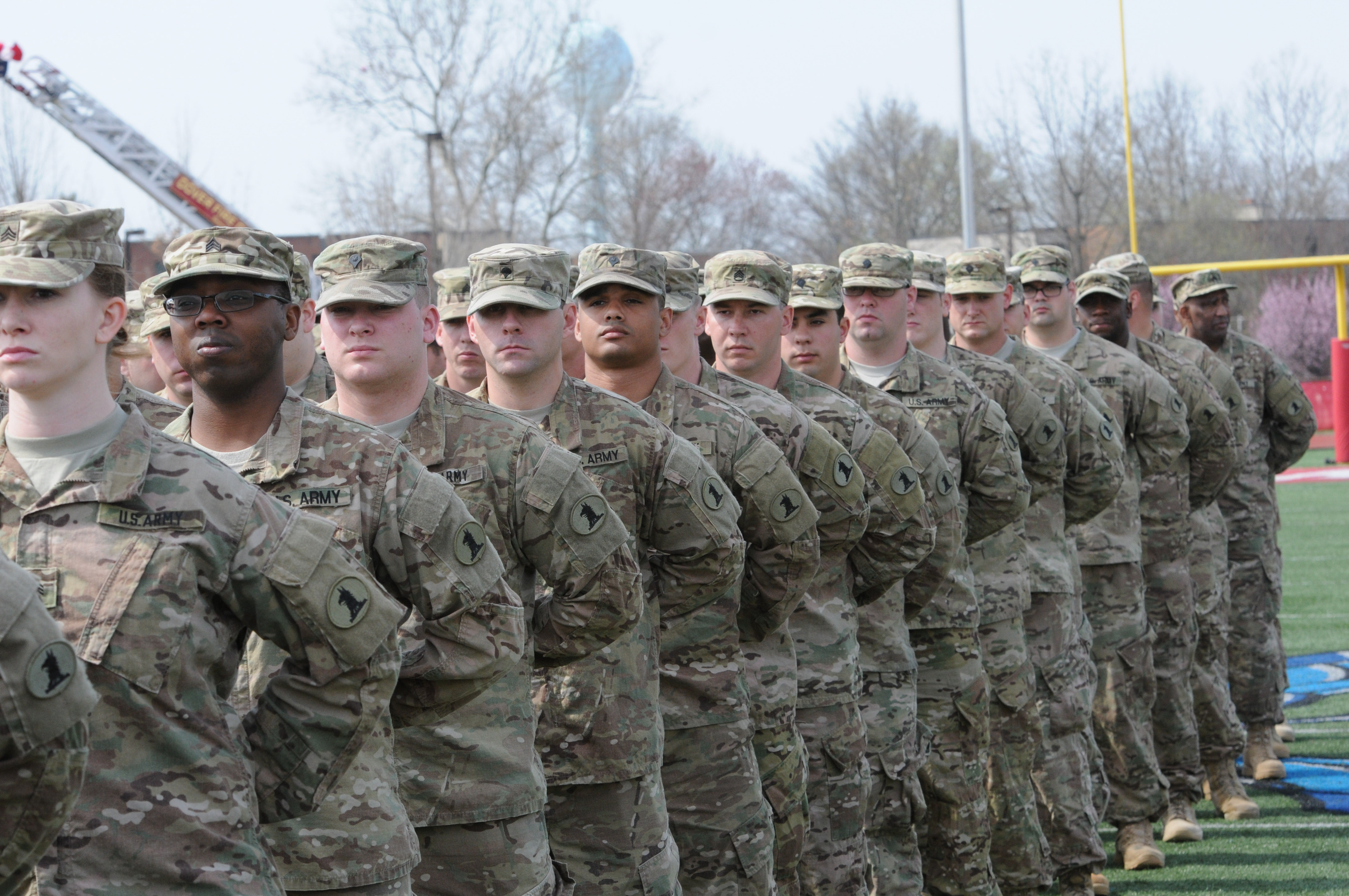
Delaware National Guard personnel standing in formation during a redeployment ceremony at Delaware State University in 2014

Military personnel or military service members are members of the state's armed forces. Their roles, pay, and obligations differ according to their military branch (army, navy, marines, coast guard, air force, and space force), rank (officer, non-commissioned officer, or enlisted recruit), and their military task when deployed on operations and on exercise.

== Terminology ==
Military personnel who serve in an army or otherwise large land force are referred to as soldiers. Those who serve in a navy, coast guard, or other seagoing force are seamen or sailors. Naval infantry or marines are personnel who serve both on land and at sea, and may be part of a navy or a marine corps. Personnel who serve in air forces are airmen. Space force personnel typically do not have a specific term given how few exist, but in the U.S. Space Force personnel are referred to as guardians.

Designated leaders of military personnel are officers. These include commissioned officers, warrant officers and non-commissioned officers. For naval forces, non-commissioned officers are referred to as petty officers.

== Demographics ==
Military personnel may be conscripted (recruited by compulsion under the law) or recruited by attracting civilians to join the armed forces. Most personnel at the start of their military career are young adults. For example, in 2013 the average age of a United States Army soldier beginning initial training was 20.7 years.

Most personnel are male. The proportion of female personnel varies internationally; for example, it is approximately 3% in India, 10% in the UK, 13% in Sweden, 16% in the U.S., and 27% in South Africa. Many state armed forces that recruit women ban them from ground close-quarters combat roles. The general focus for use of female personnel is to free men up to fight.

Personnel who join as officers tend to be upwardly mobile young adults from age 18. Most enlisted personnel have a childhood background of relative socio-economic deprivation. For example, after the US suspended conscription in 1973, "the military disproportionately attracted African American men, men from lower-status socioeconomic backgrounds, men who had been in nonacademic high school programs, and men whose high school grades tended to be low". However, a 2020 study suggests that U.S. Armed Forces personnel's socio-economic status are at parity or slightly higher than the civilian population, and that the most disadvantaged socio-economic groups are less likely to meet the requirements of the modern U.S. military. As an indication of the socio-economic background of British Army personnel, in 2015 three-quarters of its youngest recruits had the literacy skills normally expected of an 11-year-old or younger, and 7% had a reading age of 5–7.

== Initial training ==
Military personnel must be prepared to perform tasks that in civilian life would be highly unusual or absent. In particular, they must be capable of injuring and killing other people, and of facing mortal danger without fleeing. This is achieved in initial training, a physically and psychologically intensive process which resocializes recruits for the unique nature of military demands.

According to an expert in military training methods, Lt Col. Dave Grossman, initial training uses four conditioning techniques: role modeling, classical conditioning, operant conditioning, and brutalization. For example, throughout initial training:

- Individuality is suppressed (e.g. by shaving the head of new recruits, issuing uniforms, denying privacy, and prohibiting the use of first names);
- Daily routine is tightly controlled (e.g. recruits must make their beds, polish boots, and stack their clothes in a certain way, and mistakes are punished);
- Continuous stressors deplete psychological resistance to the demands of their instructors (e.g. depriving recruits of sleep, food, or shelter, shouting insults and giving orders intended to humiliate); and
- Frequent punishments serve to condition group conformity and discourage poor performance.
- The disciplined drill instructor is presented as a role model of the ideal soldier.

In conditions of continuous physical and psychological stress, the trainee group normally forms a bond of mutual loyalty, commonly experienced as an emotional commitment. It has been called a "we-feeling", and helps to commit recruits to their military organisation.

Throughout their initial training, recruits are repeatedly instructed to stand, march, and respond to orders in a ritual known as foot drill, which trains recruits to obey orders without hesitation or question. According to Finnish Army regulations, for example, the close-order drill:

- Is essential for the esprit de corps and cohesion for battlefield conditions;
- Gets the recruits used to instinctive obedience and following the orders;
- Enables large units to be marched and moved in an orderly manner; and
- Creates the basis for action in the battlefield.

In order to ensure that recruits will kill if ordered to do so, they are taught to objectify (dehumanize) their opponent as an "enemy target" to "be engaged", which will "fall when hit". They are also taught the basic skills of their profession, such as military tactics, first aid, managing their affairs in the field, and the use of weaponry and other equipment. Training is designed to test and improve the physical fitness of recruits, although the heavy strain on the body also leads to a rate of injury.

== Terms of service ==
Recruits enter a binding contract of service, which may differ according to rank, military branch, and whether the employment is full-time or part-time.

=== Minimum service period ===
Full-time military employment normally requires a minimum period of service of several years; between two and six years is typical of armed forces in Australia, the UK and the US, for example, depending on role, branch, and rank. The exception to this rule is a short discharge window, which opens after the first few weeks of training and closes a few months later, and allows recruits to leave the armed force as of right.

Part-time military employment, known as reserve service, allows a recruit to maintain a civilian job while training under military discipline for a minimum number of days per year in return for a financial bounty. Reserve recruits may be called out to deploy on operations to supplement the full-time personnel complement.

After leaving the armed forces, for a fixed period (between four and six years is normal in the UK and U.S., for example), former recruits may remain liable for compulsory return to full-time military employment in order to train or deploy on operations.

=== Military law ===
Military law introduces offenses not recognized by civilian courts, such as absence without leave (AWOL), desertion, political acts, malingering, behaving disrespectfully, and disobedience (see, for example, offences against military law in the United Kingdom). Penalties range from a summary reprimand to imprisonment for several years following a court martial. Certain fundamental rights are also restricted or suspended, including the freedom of association (e.g. union organizing) and freedom of speech (speaking to the media). Military personnel in some countries have a right of conscientious objection if they believe an order is immoral or unlawful, or cannot in good conscience carry it out.

=== Posting and deployment ===
Personnel may be posted to bases in their home country or overseas, according to operational need, and may be deployed from those bases on exercises or operations anywhere in the world. The length of postings and deployments are regulated. In the UK, for example, a soldier is expected to be on deployment for no more than six months in every 30 months. These regulations may be waived at times of high operational tempo, however.

=== Benefits ===
Benefits and perks of military service typically include adventurous training, subsidised accommodation, meals and travel, and a pension. Some armed forces also subsidise recruits' education before, during and/or after military service; examples are the Royal Military College Saint-Jean in Canada, the Welbeck Defence Sixth Form College in the UK, and the GI Bill arrangements in the US. Conditions for participation normally apply, including a minimum period of formal military employment.

== Appearance ==
While on duty, military personnel are normally required to wear a military uniform, normally showing their name, rank, and military branch.

== See also ==
- Military recruitment
- Recruit training
- Women in the military
- Children in the military
- Transgender people and military service
- LGBT people and military service
- Sexual harassment in the military
- Conscientious objector
- Conscription
- Military specialism
