= Sentence (law) =

Decree of punishment in law

In criminal law, a sentence is the punishment for a crime ordered by a trial court after conviction in a criminal procedure, normally at the conclusion of a trial. A sentence may consist of imprisonment, a fine, or other sanctions. Sentences for multiple crimes may be a concurrent sentence, where sentences of imprisonment are all served together at the same time, or a consecutive sentence, in which the period of imprisonment is the sum of all sentences served one after the other. Additional sentences include intermediate, which allows an inmate to be free for about 8 hours a day for work purposes; determinate, which is fixed on a number of days, months, or years; and indeterminate or bifurcated, which mandates the minimum period be served in an institutional setting such as a prison followed by street time period of parole, supervised release or probation until the total sentence is completed.

If a sentence is reduced to a less harsh punishment, then the sentence is said to have been mitigated or commuted. Rarely, depending on circumstances, murder charges are mitigated and reduced to manslaughter charges. However, in certain legal systems, a defendant may be punished beyond the terms of the sentence, through phenomena including social stigma, loss of governmental benefits, or collectively, the collateral consequences of criminal charges.

Statutes generally specify the highest penalties that may be imposed for certain offenses, and sentencing guidelines often mandate the minimum and maximum imprisonment terms to imposed upon an offender, which is then left to the discretion of the trial court. However, in some jurisdictions, prosecutors have great influence over the punishments actually handed down, by virtue of their discretion to decide what offenses to charge the offender with and what facts they will seek to prove or to ask the defendant to stipulate to in a plea agreement. It has been argued that legislators have an incentive to enact tougher sentences than even they would like to see applied to the typical defendant since they recognize that the blame for an inadequate sentencing range to handle a particularly egregious crime would fall upon legislators, but the blame for excessive punishments would fall upon prosecutors.

Sentencing law sometimes includes cliffs that result in much stiffer penalties when certain facts apply. For instance, an armed career criminal or habitual offender law may subject a defendant to a significant increase in their sentence if they commit a third offence of a certain kind. This makes it difficult for fine gradations in punishments to be achieved.

== History ==
Felony Sentences in State Courts, study by the United States Department of Justice

The earliest use of the term with this meaning was in Roman law, where it indicated the opinion of a jurist on a given question, expressed in written or in oral responsa. It might also refer to the opinion of senators that was translated into the senatus consultus. Finally, it might also refer to the decision of the bench in both civil and penal trials, as well as the decision of the arbiters in arbitration.

In modern Latin systems, the sentence is mainly the final act of any procedure in which a judge or body of judges is called upon to express their evaluation. It can therefore be issued in practically any field of law requiring a function of evaluation of something by a judge or judging body.

== Classification ==
Sentences are variously classified depending on

- the legal field, or kind of action, or system it refers to:
  - civil, penal, administrative, canon, sentence.
  - sentences of mere clearance, of condemnation, of constitution.
- the issuing body, typically a monocratic judge or a court, or other figures that receive a legitimation by the system.
- the jurisdiction and the legal competence single judges, courts, tribunals, appeals, supreme courts, constitutional courts, meant as the various degrees of judgement and appeal.
- the content:
  - partial, cautelar, interlocutory, preliminar sententia instructoria, definitive sentences.
  - sentence of absolutio discharge or condemnatio briefly damnatio, also for other meanings condemnation. The sentences of condemnation are also classified by the penalty they determine:
    - sentence of reclusion,
    - sentence of fee,
    - sententia agendi, sentence that impose a determined action or a series of action as a penalty for the illegal act. This kind of sentence became better developed and remained in wider use in common law systems.

== Philosophies ==
The sentence meted out depends on the philosophical principle used by the court and what the legal system regards as the purpose of punishment. The most common purposes of sentencing are:

- Retribution
- Deterrence of the individual or of others
- Denunciation
- Incapacitation
- Rehabilitation
- Reparation

Theory	Aim of theory	Potential punishment
Retribution	Punishment imposed for no reason other than an offense being committed, on the basis that if proportionate, punishment is morally acceptable as a response that satisfies the aggrieved party, their intimates and society.	Tariff sentences; Sentence must be proportionate to the crime
Deterrence of the individual	The individual is deterred through fear of further punishment.	Prison sentence; Fine
Deterrence of others	The general public are warned of likely punishment.	Prison sentence; Fine; Depends on others being aware of the sentence.
Denunciation	Society expressing its disapproval reinforcing moral boundaries	Reflects blameworthiness of offense
Incapacitation protection of the public	Offender is made incapable of committing further crime to protect society at large from crime.	Prison sentence; Electronic tagging; Banning orders
Rehabilitation	To reform the offender's behavior	Individualized sentences; Community service orders
Reparation	Repayment to victims or to community	Compensation; Unpaid work; Reparation schemes

In England and Wales, section 142 of the Criminal Justice Act 2003 has specified that in cases involving those over 18, courts should have regard to punishment of the offenders retribution, deterrence, reform and rehabilitation, protection of the public, and reparation to persons affected by their offences.

== Process ==
Usually, the sentence comes at the end of a process in which the presiding judge or judges have been enabled to evaluate whether the conduct in question complies or does not comply with the law, and which aspects might be breaches of which specific legislation. Depending on jurisdiction, the stages leading up to the sentence may vary, and the sentence may be challenged by both parties up to a given degree of appeal. If appealed against, the sentence issued by the highest appellate court to which the case is admitted becomes the definitive sentence. The sentence usually has to be publicly announced; and, in most jurisdictions, has to be justified through an explanation of the juridical reflections and evaluations that lie behind it.

Even a definitive sentence can be annulled in exceptional circumstances, usually predetermined within the jurisdiction in question. Most such cases arise from irregularities found in the judicial process after sentence has been passed. The most extreme examples arise in criminal cases, when conclusive proof of innocence comes to light after sentence has been passed, leading to the sentence's annulment.

In most jurisdictions, under double jeopardy legislation, the definitive sentence is unique, in the sense that (except for appeal hearings) no individual can be judged or sentenced more than once for the same actions.

In many jurisdictions, sentences are a source of law, in that they represent an authoritative interpretation of the law in concrete cases.

The sentence is typically determined by a judge and/or jury, and is issued in the name or on behalf of the superior authority of the state.

== See also ==
- Criminal costs
- Criminal sentencing in Canada
- Criminal sentencing in the United States
- English criminal law
- Incapacitation (penology)
- Sentencing disparity
- Sentencing in England and Wales
- Judgment (law)
- Sentencing guidelines
