= The Rope, the Chair, and the Needle =

1993 book by James W. Marquart, Sheldon Ekland-Olson, and Jonathan R. Sorensen

The Rope, the Chair, and the Needle: Capital Punishment in Texas, 1923–1990
- Author: James W. Marquart
- Language: English
- Subject: capital punishment in Texas
- Genre: Non-fiction
- Publisher: University of Texas Press
- Publication date: 1993
- Publication place: United States
- ISBN: 978-0-292-75213-9

The Rope, the Chair, and the Needle: Capital Punishment in Texas, 1923–1990 is a 1993 book by James W. Marquart, Sheldon Ekland-Olson, and Jonathan R. Sorensen that examines capital punishment in Texas.

The book considers the historical administration of the Texas death penalty through both statistical and anecdotal analysis. The authors argue that the execution rate in Texas is a symptom of the "cultural tradition of exclusion" in the Southern United States. They found there was an inverse relationship between the number of executions and lynchings. When the number of lynchings declined, the execution rate went up. Executions, they argue, are a way to continue to "dehumanize" and "exclude" certain groups from normal society.

The book was published by the University of Texas Press in 1993 (ISBN 978-0-292-75213-9).
