= Military career =

Trade or career specialty in armed forces

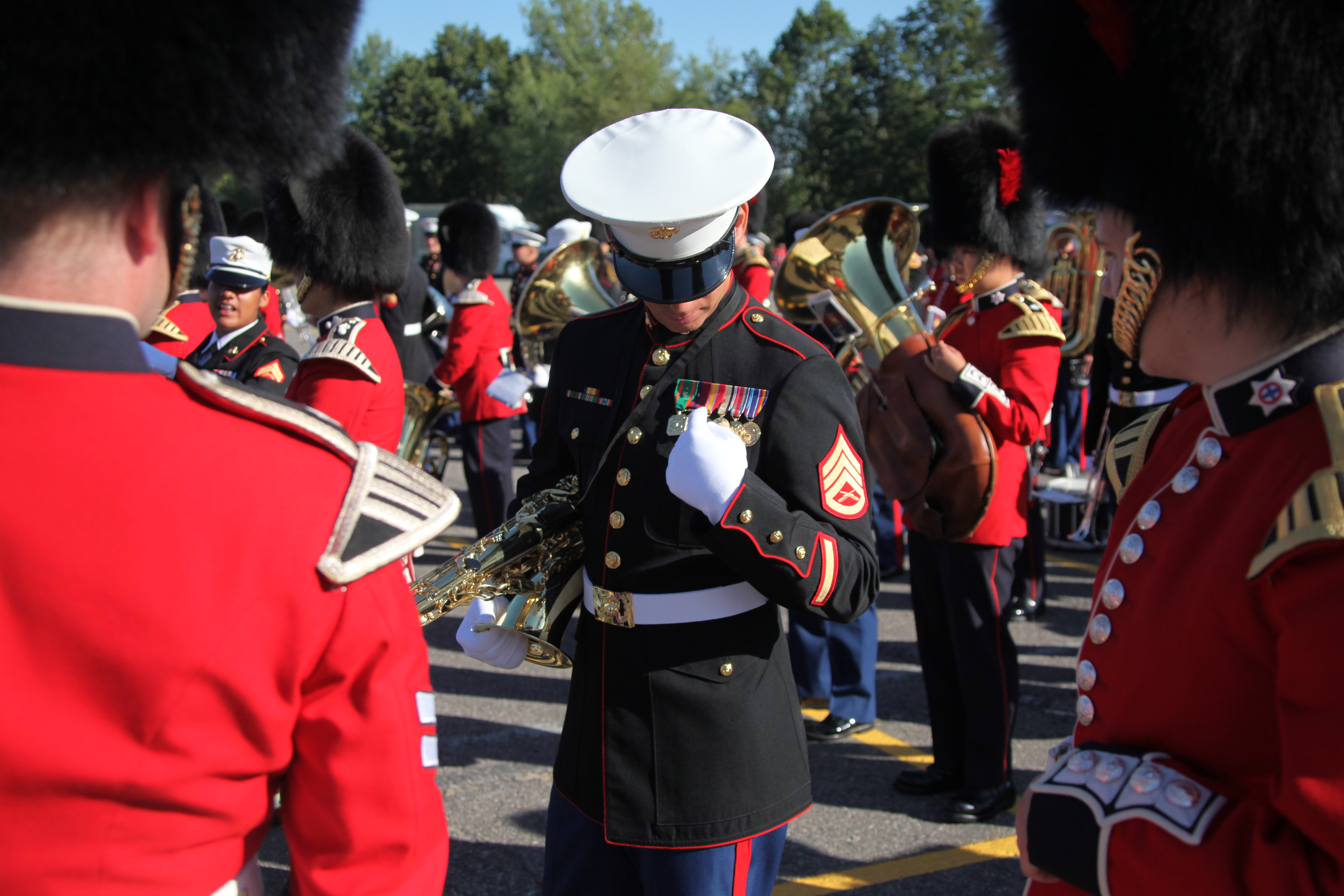
Military musicians of Canada and the United States conversing during a rehearsal for the Fortissimo Sunset Ceremony. Military music is one of the many trades for individuals in the militaries of both countries.

Military careers are the chosen or assigned trade or career specialties in the armed forces which demand from the individuals achievement of qualifications, and a degree of knowledge and skill in the tradecraft to perform tasks and assignments to an acceptable level of completeness or quality.

== Overview ==
Commonly military occupations are specific to the Arm, Service or Branch of the armed forces because of the different requirements of the personnel to operate in different environments, using different technologies and working within different operational systems.

The general term of reference to service personnel in the land component of an armed forces is a soldier, that of the naval component a sailor, that of the naval infantry component a marine, and in the air component an airman, which are sometimes also the lowest military rank in these services.

== See also ==
- List of established military terms
- Military personnel
- United States military occupation code
