= An Expressive Theory of Punishment =

2016 book by Bill Wringe

- First edition
- Author: Bill Wringe
- Subject: Denunciation (penology)
- Published: 2016
- Publisher: Palgrave Macmillan
- Pages: 188 pp.
- ISBN: 978-1-137-35712-0

An Expressive Theory of Punishment is a 2016 book by Bill Wringe, in which the author tries to develop and argue for what he refers to as a "denunciatory theory" of punishment.
