= Florence Garrettson Spooner =

- Born: Florence Garrettson; 1840s Baltimore, Maryland, U.S.
- Died: May 7, 1935; Boston, Massachusetts, U.S.
- Occupation: social reformer
- Known for: prison reform

Florence Garrettson Spooner (1840s – May 7, 1935) was an American social reformer actively engaged in humane and reformatory lines. Born in Baltimore, Maryland, she made her home in Boston, Massachusetts, where she served as President of the Massachusetts Prison Reform League. Spooner was known throughout the House of Correction as the "women's missionary friend". She was the founder of the Anti-Death Penalty League. In her day, Spooner's name became as famous as Elizabeth Fry and Dorothea Dix.

== Early life and education ==
Florence Garretson was born in Baltimore, Maryland, in the 1840s. Her parents were J. Aquila and Eleanor (Dorsey) Garrettson. On her mother's side, she was descended from one of the most noted families of colonial history in Maryland. Her ancestors were of the Dorsey, Worthington, Howard, and Hammond connection. One of her great-grandfathers was William Ball, closely related to Mary Ball Washington, the mother of George Washington. The Garrettsons, on her father's side, were among the earliest settlers of Maryland and New York. In the year 1752, the Rev. Freeborn Garrettson gave up his grants of land, and freed his slaves through religious convictions. He became a missionary of the Methodist Episcopal Church, travelling from the Carolinas to Nova Scotia on horseback. His wife, Katherine Livingston, was a daughter of Judge Livingston and sister to Robert R. Livingston, the first Chancellor of New York.

Spooner was educated at the Morrison Academy in Baltimore, and made a special study of music. In girlhood and early womanhood, Spooner was devoted to music, using her voice in many choirs, and belonging to the most exclusive musical clubs.

== Career ==
Spooner was untiring in her study of the prison system in the U.S. She served on philanthropic committees, turning into practical channels her sympathy and compassion for those less fortunate. She was described as "a religious, consuming soul, always in communication with the authorities of Church and State, going straight on, radiating in a hundred directions, bringing forces to bear on the whole circumference of unusual cruelties." She succeeded in getting notable people together at important houses and in the chapels of leading churches. These included bishops, governors, and other officials. In 1894, Governor Frederic T. Greenhalge gave his support to her cause by presiding at a meeting where three subjects were especially advocated—abolition of dungeons (dark cells), the indeterminate sentence, and the supplanting of houses of correction by reformatories. Prison commissioners and representatives of the Prison Association and other organizations participated in the discussion. This meeting, the first held by the Prison Reform League, was arranged by Spooner, Mrs. James T. Fields, and Miss Mason. Among other conferences held by Spooner and her co-workers was one at Trinity Church Chapel, presided over by Mayor Josiah Quincy.

The successful work accomplished by Spooner toward the abolishment of dark cells in the city prisons and the good done by her was specially commended by Dr. Alfred B. Heath, Commissioner, Institutions Department of the City of Boston, in 1896. Penal Institutions Commissioner, Ernest C. Marshall, also officially endorsed her beneficent work. The League agitated the subject of the system of fines for drunkenness, which they considered as indefensible. The Police Commission responded promptly to their request for co-operation, and Chairman Martin invited Spooner, Robert Treat Paine, Commissioner Marshall, and a Sister of St. Margaret's to make a midnight tour of inspection of station-house cells as a study of the subject.

In 1896–97, under the guidance of leading men, Spooner engaged in the movement to abolish capital punishment, resulting in the substitution of the electric chair for the scaffold. She organized the Anti-Death Penalty League in 1897, and, after the first twenty signatures were obtained, names were forwarded to her in such numbers that it was impossible for one person to keep the records. Spooner wrote numerous letters to experts throughout the country, and secured valuable facts that resulted in the formation of this League. The League was not content that the agitation abolished the gallows, nor did it accept as true that electrocution was an improvement.

Spooner presented able arguments before the Joint Committee on the Judiciary of the Massachusetts Legislature, arranged many hearings, distributed literature, and wrote hundreds of articles upon the subject. She received numerous requests from libraries for copies of her sociological writings.

In literary work and on the platform as a lecturer, she was straightforward and at ease in discussing all phases and points of prison reform. Because of her tact, amiability, and encouragement to prisoners, she had the confidence of officials and special privileges to study human nature from the inside of the prison, accorded to no other woman in the State, prison commissioners excepted. Praise of Spooner's charity work was included in the annual report of the penal institutions commissioner to the mayor of the city of Boston in 1899, under the head of "Reform of Women Inmates".—

"A most encouraging work has been done by Mrs. Florence Garrettson Spooner, the President of the Prison Reform League. Recognizing her earnest sympathy for female prisoners, I appointed her in the early part of 1898 to do such work as missionary among the female inmates of the House of Correction as she might think proper looking toward their reformation. I have been much pleased with her work there. The most hardened women have softened under the beneficent influence with which she has surrounded them. No better measure of her work can be shown than the decrease in the punishments among the class with which she works."

Governor Greenhalge appointed Spooner to the colonial committee of twelve from Massachusetts to the Cotton States and International Exposition (Atlanta, Georgia, 1895). For her work, she was awarded the World's Gold Medal and Diploma by the Louisiana Purchase Exposition (St. Louis, Missouri, 1904) and by Lewis and Clark Centennial Exposition (Portland, Oregon, 1905).

== Personal life ==
Her husband, Henry T. Spooner, a studious man, devoted to his books, supported his wife's work. He was born in Brooklyn New York, son of Henry Pierson and Emma (Brittan) Spooner. His father was a descendant of the Aldens, Germaynes, and Cottons. His mother was the daughter of Thomas Standfast Brittan, a clergyman who left England and became rector of a church in Brooklyn. Their son, Henry Garrettson Spooner (1871-1911), was the founder and first editor of the American Journal of Urology, the official organ of the American Urology Association, and the first journal in the English language to consider exclusively diseases of the genito-urinary organs.

Florence Garrettson Spooner died at her home in Boston, May 7, 1935. Her papers are held at the Boston Public Library Archives & Special Collections Repository.
