= Deterrence (penology) =

Use of punishment as a threat to deter people from offending

Deterrence in relation to criminal offending is the idea or theory that the threat of punishment will deter people from committing crime and reduce the probability and/or level of offending in society. It is one of five objectives that punishment is thought to achieve; the other four objectives are denunciation, incapacitation (for the protection of society), retribution and rehabilitation.

Criminal deterrence theory has two possible applications: the first is that punishments imposed on individual offenders will deter or prevent that particular offender from committing further crimes; the second is that public knowledge that certain offences will be punished has a generalised deterrent effect which prevents others from committing crimes.

Two different aspects of punishment may have an impact on deterrence, the first being the certainty of punishment, by increasing the likelihood of apprehension and punishment, this may have a deterrent effect. The second relates to the severity of punishment; how severe the punishment is for a particular crime may influence behavior if the potential offender concludes that the punishment is so severe, it is not worth the risk of getting caught.

An underlying principle of deterrence is that it is utilitarian or forward-looking. As with rehabilitation, it is designed to change behaviour in the future rather than simply provide retribution or punishment for current or past behaviour.

== Categories ==
There are two main goals of deterrence theory.

Individual deterrence is the aim of punishment to discourage the offender from criminal acts in the future. The belief is that when punished, offenders recognise the unpleasant consequences of their actions on themselves and will change their behaviour accordingly.

General deterrence is the intention to deter the general public from committing crime by punishing those who do offend. When an offender is punished by, for example, being sent to prison, a clear message is sent to the rest of society that behaviour of this sort will result in an unpleasant response from the criminal justice system. Most people do not want to be imprisoned and so they are deterred from committing crimes that might be punished that way.

== Underlying assumptions ==
A key assumption underlying deterrence theory is that offenders weigh up the pros and cons of a certain course of action and make rational choices. Known as rational choice theory, it assumes the following:

- People are able to freely choose their actions and behaviour (as opposed to their offending being driven by socio-economic factors such as unemployment, poverty, limited education and/or addiction).
- The offender is capable of assessing the likelihood of getting caught.
- The offender knows the likely punishment that will be received.
- The offender is able to calculate whether the pain or severity of the likely punishment outweighs the gain or benefit of getting away with the crime.

Other assumptions relate to the concept of marginal deterrence, based on the belief that it is prudent to punish a more severe crime more severely than a lesser crime and a series of crimes more severely than a single crime. The assumption here is that more severe penalties will deter criminals from committing more serious acts and so there is a marginal gain. On the other hand, research by Rupp (2008) shows a pattern in which legal sanctions have stronger deterrent effects for minor crimes than for violent or more serious crimes. Consequently, Rupp (2008) suggests that there is a categorical difference in the factors that deter minor crimes and violent crimes.

=== Philosophical basis ===
Two utilitarian philosophers of the 18th century, Cesare Beccaria and Jeremy Bentham, formulated the deterrence theory as both an explanation of crime and a method for reducing it. Beccaria argued that crime was not only an attack on an individual but on society as well. That extended the issue of punishment beyond retribution and restitution to aggrieved individuals. Society was cast as victim, not merely bystander, and what had been seen as a dispute between individuals, expanded to an issue of criminal law. For the utilitarians, the purpose of punishment became the protection of society through the prevention of crime.

== Evidential flaws ==
=== Lack of rationality ===
==== Impact of alcohol and drugs ====
In the United States, one study found that at least half of all state prisoners are under the influence of alcohol or drugs at the time of their offence. The National Center for Drug Abuse Statistics estimates that twenty-six percent of US arrests are related to drug offenses.

==== Impact of mental health disorders ====
Research shows that a significant proportion of those in prison have personality disorders or other mental health disorders which affect their ability to make rational decisions. A 2016 study in Lancet Psychiatry has found that "prisoners have high rates of psychiatric disorders... Despite the high level of need, these disorders are frequently under-diagnosed and poorly treated". In 2002, a systematic review of 62 different studies from 12 different countries published in The Lancet found 65% of men in prison and 42% of women have a personality disorder. Mental health and personality disorders will clearly have an impact of an individual's capacity to make rational decisions about their offending behaviour.

==== Impact of brain injury ====
Many inmates have suffered head injuries, which can lead to loss of impulse control and cognitive impairment. A study in 2010 found that over 60% of prison inmates had experienced a significant head injury. Adults with traumatic brain injury were first sent to prison when quite young and reported higher rates of repeat offending. Having a head injury also reduces an individual's capacity for rational decision making, and the same goes for Fetal alcohol spectrum disorder, a neurological disability of the brain. Research has found that it causes "learning disabilities, impulsivity, hyperactivity, social ineptness, poor judgment, and can increase susceptibility to victimization and involvement in the criminal justice system". In fact, youths with FASD are 19 times more likely to be incarcerated than those without FASD in a given year because of their poor decision-making.

=== Knowledge of likely punishment ===
In order for a particular sanction to act as a deterrent, potential offenders must be aware of exactly what punishment they will receive before they commit an offence. However, evidence suggests that few people know what sentence will be imposed for a particular crime and, in the United States, most people generally underestimate how severe the sentence will be. Offenders are likely to be well aware that crimes such as assault, robbery, drug dealing, rape and murder will be punished but lack fine-grained knowledge of what the specific penalty is likely to be. A study by Anderson (2002) found that only 22% of offenders convicted of cultivating cannabis "knew exactly what the penalties would be". That is not surprising given that sentencing is a complex process: what sanction is imposed depends on a number of different factors including the offender's age, previous criminal history, whether or not they plead guilty, their perceived level of remorse, and any other mitigating factors. If a potential offender does not know what punishment will be imposed, that undermines the ability to make a rational choice about whether the potential pain associated with committing a particular crime outweighs the potential gain.

Another concern is that even if offenders have accurate knowledge about potential penalties, they do not necessarily take that information into account prior to committing a crime. Anderson found that 35% of offenders failed to think about the likely punishment prior to committing the offence. Durrant (2014) points out that many crimes are impulsive in nature and carried out "in the heat of the moment with little forethought or planning".

=== Lack of certainty of punishment ===
There are usually significant differences between the levels of crime in official statistics and the number of people who report they have been victimised in surveys of crime. In the United Kingdom, only an estimated 2% of offences lead to a conviction, and only one in seven of those convictions results in a prison sentence. The Home Office (1993) concluded that "the probability of being sent to prison for a crime is about one in 300". In the United States, it has been calculated that only one out of every 100 burglaries leads to a custodial sentence. In regard to drug use, the chances of getting caught are even more remote: less than one in 3,000. If it is unlikely that an offender will actually be caught, let alone punished, there is thus very little certainty of punishment, and any deterrent effect is substantially reduced.

==== Perceptions of risk ====
Russell Durrant argues that it is the perception of risk that has the potential to deter offending rather than punishment itself. He cites a study of offenders in which 76% did not think about getting caught or thought the chances of getting caught were slim. Offenders who have successfully gotten away with certain crimes are especially likely to discount the probability of getting caught, particularly for drunk-driving. Durrant concludes: "for any given offence, the chances of actually getting punished by the criminal justice system are quite slim and active criminals are well aware of these favourable odds, thus undermining the potential deterrent effects of punishment".

==== Certainty vs. severity ====
It is commonly assumed that increasing the severity of punishment increases the potential pain or cost of committing a crime and should therefore make offending less likely. One of the simplest methods to increase the severity is to impose a longer prison term for a particular crime. However, there are limits to how severe a punishment can be imposed because of the principle of proportionality: the severity of the punishment should be roughly proportionate to the gravity of the offending. In a review of the literature, Durrant found that "most systematic reviews of the effects of sentencing severity on crime conclude, with a few exceptions, that there is little or no evidence that increasing the punitiveness of criminal sanctions exerts an effect on offending". This is partly because many offenders get used to being in prison with the result that longer sentences are not necessarily perceived as being more severe than shorter sentences.

Offenders who perceive that sanctions for particular crimes are almost inevitable are less likely to engage in criminal activity. However, because of low apprehension rates in most criminal justice systems, in practice it is much easier to make penalties more severe than it is to make them more certain.

== Effectiveness ==
Measuring and estimating the effects of criminal sanction on subsequent criminal behavior are difficult. Despite numerous studies using a variety of data sources, sanctions, crime types, statistical methods and theoretical approaches, there remains little agreement in the scientific literature about whether, how, under what circumstances, to what extent, for which crimes, at what cost, for which individuals and, perhaps most importantly, in which direction do various aspects of contemporary criminal sanctions affect subsequent criminal behavior. There are extensive reviews of this literature with somewhat conflicting assessments.

=== As a general deterrent ===
Daniel Nagin believes the collective actions of the criminal justice system exert a very substantial deterrent on the community as a whole. He says it is also his "view that this conclusion is of limited value in formulating policy". He argues that the issue is not whether the criminal justice system in itself prevents or deters crime but whether a new policy, added onto the existing structure, will have any additional deterrent effect.

=== As an individual deterrent ===
More recent research by Nagin (2009) found that increased severity of punishment had little deterrent effect on individual offenders.

A meta-analysis of the deterrent effect of punishment on individual offenders also suggests little benefit is gained from tougher sentences. In 2001 Canadian criminologist, Paul Gendreau, brought together the results of 50 different studies of the deterrent effect of imprisonment involving over 350,000 offenders. This included studies which compared the impact of prison over community sentences and the impact of longer versus shorter prison sentences on recidivism rates. The results revealed no support for the deterrent effects of punishment. Gendreau wrote: "None of the analyses found imprisonment reduced recidivism. The recidivism rate for offenders who were imprisoned as opposed to given a community sanction was similar. In addition, longer sentences were not associated with reduced recidivism. In fact the opposite was found. Longer sentences were associated with a 3% increase in recidivism. This finding suggests some support for the theory that prison may serve as a 'school for crime' for some offenders".

Durrant states that "reviews of 'enhanced punishment' such as boot camps, intensive supervision, 'scared straight' programs, and electronic monitoring are typically consistent with the thesis that increasing the severity of punishment does not act as a significant deterrent to offenders".

In a different kind of study, Kuziemko found that when parole was abolished (as a result of which prisoners served their full sentence), that increased the crime rate and the prison population by 10%. This is because prisoners who know they may get out early if they behave are psychologically invested in rehabilitation. When parole was eliminated for certain offenders (meaning there was no hope of early release), those prisoners accumulated more disciplinary infractions, completed fewer rehabilitative programs, and re-offended at higher rates than inmates who were released early.

Mann et al. (2016) found that internal sanctions such as feeling guilty are stronger than legal sanctions at deterring crime. However, legal sanctions gain strength in situations in which a would-be perpetrator is unlikely to feel guilty.

=== Likelihood vs. severity ===
The perceived likelihood that one will be caught is far more effective as a deterrent than the severity of the punishment. The presence of police officers has also been effective at deterring crime, as criminals in the presence of police officers have a stronger understanding of the certainty of being caught. Seeing handcuffs and a radio are also likely to influence a criminal's behavior.

=== Death penalty ===
The death penalty is still retained in some countries, such as in the United States (at the federal level and in some states), one reason being due to the perception that it is a deterrent to certain offenses. In 1975, economist Isaac Ehrlich claimed the death penalty was effective as a general deterrent and that each execution led to seven or eight fewer homicides in society. More recent research has failed to find such effects. Durrant believes that different outcomes achieved by different researchers depend largely on which research model is used.

A major difficulty in evaluating the effectiveness of the death penalty as a deterrent in the United States is that very few people are actually executed. Fagan (2006) points out that "the rare and somewhat arbitrary use of execution in states [which still have the death penalty] means that it serves no deterrent function, because no would-be murderer can reasonably expect to be executed".

A 2012 report by the National Research Council of the National Academies concluded that studies claiming a deterrent effect, brutalization effect, or no effect on murder rates from the death penalty are fundamentally flawed. Criminologist Daniel Nagin of Carnegie Mellon said: "Nothing is known about how potential murderers actually perceive their risk of punishment." The report concluded: "The committee concludes that research to date on the effect of capital punishment on homicide is not informative about whether capital punishment decreases, increases, or has no effect on homicide rates".

== See also ==
- Capital punishment and deterrence in the United States
- Collateral consequences of criminal conviction
- Loss of rights due to criminal conviction
- Non-economic damages caps
- Punitive damages
- Rehabilitation (penology)
- Victimology
- Victims' rights

== Bibliography ==
- Hagan, John, A.R. Gillis, and David Brownfield. Criminological Controversies: A Methodical Primer. Boulder: Westview, 1996. 81–3.
