= Denunciation (penology) =

Denunciation in the context of sentencing philosophy, refers to society’s expression of disapproval of an act through the imposition of punishment. The purpose of denunciation is not to punish the offender directly, but to signal to law-abiding citizens that the behavior in question is unacceptable. In this respect, it has been argued that "punishment is not like a private letter; it is like a billboard put up on a busy street… it is also meant for the victim of crime and for the public at large”. Denunciation is one of five different objectives that punishment is thought to achieve; the other four objectives are deterrence, incapacitation (for the protection of society), retribution and rehabilitation.

== Theories ==
=== Instrumental denunciation ===
Durkheim (1960) argued that denunciation was a form of education in that punishment "reinforces the conscience collective of society and thereby ensure(s) that members of society continued to refrain from crime". This is a forward looking or utilitarian approach which is similar to the concept of deterrence.

=== Expressive denunciation ===
This view of denunciation is that punishment is justified because it expresses society's abhorrence of crime and shows the commitment of a particular society to its own values. This perspective is not forward-looking as it does not aim to change or affect anyone's behaviour.

=== Communicative theory of punishment ===
Antony Duff (1986) claims that punishment is "an attempt at moral dialogue with offenders, censuring their actions and hoping to secure their ‘contrition’, with the result that they mend their ways." Cavadino says this view 'resembles denunciation' but also contains elements of reform and reintegrative shaming.

== Legislative applications ==
Some jurisdictions include 'denunciation' as a sentencing purpose in their legislation. For instance, The Canadian Criminal Code describes the principles and purpose of sentencing in section 718. One of those purposes is denunciation, described as "making sure the punishment reflects society’s abhorrence for the crime committed". In New Zealand, section 7 of the Sentencing Act 2002 describes eight different purposes of sentencing for 'dealing with offenders'. The purpose under section 7(a) is "to hold the offender accountable for harm done to the victim and the community by the offending and 7(e) is "to denounce the conduct in which the offender was involved."

== Effectiveness ==
Cavadino says research indicates that citizens generally seem to have sufficient respect for the justice system to obey the laws in society and are not particularly influenced by the level of punishment imposed for particular offences - bearing in mind that people often have quite inaccurate beliefs about what the penalties are for particular offences. As a consequence, he argues that using the notion of denunciation to justify punishing offenders is a dubious mechanism to use.

== See also ==
- An Expressive Theory of Punishment
