= M. Dwayne Smith =

American criminologist

- Education: University of Houston (B.S., 1971; M.A., 1973), Duke University (Ph.D., 1980)
- Known for: Studying jury decisions in capital punishment cases in North Carolina
- Scientific career
- Fields: Criminology, sociology
- Workplaces: Lamar University, Tulane University, University of North Carolina Charlotte, University of South Florida
- Thesis: A longitudinal analysis of social control theory (1980)

M. Dwayne Smith is an American criminologist and professor of criminology at the University of South Florida (https://www.usf.edu/cbcs/criminology/faculty-staff/d-smith.aspx). He joined USF in 2000 as Chair of the Department of Criminology. From 2005-2022, he served as USF's Senior Vice Provost and in 2009 his role was expanded to include Dean of the Office of Graduate Studies. In 2022, he returned to his position in the Department of Criminology.

Smith is the founding editor of the peer-reviewed journal Homicide Studies, which he edited from 1996 to 2001. He is an expert on various forms of homicides, but his work during the 2000s has focused mainly on researching jury decisions in death penalty cases in North Carolina, a pursuit he continues at present. He has published extensively on these topics in well-known peer-reviewed academic journals such as American Journal of Sociology, American Sociological Review, Journal of Crime & Delinquency, Journal of Crime & Justice, Justice Quarterly, and Social Forces. He is also the co-author (with Margaret Zahn) of two edited volumes that have been frequently cited in the academic literature, Homicide: A Sourcebook of Social Research (1999) and Studying and Preventing Homicide: Issues & Challenges (1999).
