= Colin Wringe =

British educational theorist (born 1937)

- Born: 1937 (age 88–89)

Education
- Education: UCL Institute of Education (PhD), Oxford University (BA)
- Thesis: Some aspects of the concept of rights and its application to the education of children (1979)

Philosophical work
- Era: 21st-century philosophy
- Region: Western philosophy
- School: Analytic philosophy
- Institutions: Keele University
- Main interests: Philosophy of education

Colin Wringe (born 1937) is a British educational theorist and Reader in Education at Keele University, where he is an honorary fellow of the School of Social Science and Public Policy. He is best known for his works on moral education.

== Books ==
- Developments in modern language teaching (Open Books, 1976)
- Children's rights: a philosophical study (Routledge, 1981)
- Democracy, schooling, and political education (Routledge, 1984)
- Understanding educational aims (Unwyn Hyman, 1988)
- Effective teaching of modern languages (Longman, 1989)
- Moral education: beyond the teaching of right and wrong (Springer, 2006)
