= Naci Mocan =

Turkish-American economist and scholar

H. Naci Mocan is a Turkish-American economist and scholar. He is the Ourso Distinguished Chair of Economics at Louisiana State University. He specializes in labor economics, health economics, and the economics of crime.

== Education and early life ==
Mocan was born in Istanbul, Turkey, where he attended Istanbul Erkek Lisesi. He studied economics at Bogazici University and received his Ph.D. in economics from Graduate Center of the City University of New York. He was a research fellow at the Institute for the Study of Labor (IZA).

== Research ==
Mocan is a specialist in the areas of labor economics, health economics, and the economics of crime. In the early 2000s he became part of the debate on the effectiveness of the death penalty when his research found that the death penalty is a deterrent of crime. He has also examined the effects of education in developing countries, including the impact that education has on female empowerment and religiosity and superstition. He has used econometric tools to measure vengeance.
