= Sheldon Ekland-Olson =

American sociologist and Rapoport

- Born: 1944 (age 81–82); California
- Education: Seattle Pacific University; University of Washington
- Known for: Being provost of the University of Texas at Austin; Author of Who Lives, Who Dies, Who Decides; Co-author of The Rope, the Chair, and the Needle
- Scientific career
- Fields: Sociology
- Workplaces: University of Texas at Austin
- Thesis: The rise and fall of student involvement in law school (1971)

Sheldon Ekland-Olson (born 1944 in California) is an American sociologist and Rapoport Centennial Professor of sociology at the University of Texas at Austin (UT-Austin).

== Education and career ==
Ekland-Olson received his bachelor's degree from Seattle Pacific University in 1966 and his Ph.D. from the University of Washington in 1971. He went on to serve as a special assistant to the chancellor of the University of Texas system from 1988 to 1991. He was the associate dean of the University of Texas at Austin College of Liberal Arts from 1991 to 1993, whereupon he became the College's dean. In 1998, he became the executive vice president and provost of UT-Austin, a position he held until 2006. He has also been the director of UT-Austin's Division of Statistics and Scientific Computation and the School of Human Ecology.

== Books ==
- Steve J. Martin and Sheldon Ekland-Olson Texas Prisons: And the Walls Came Tumbling Down. Austin, Texas: Texas Monthly Press.
- 1993 Sheldon Ekland-Olson and William Kelly Justice Under Pressure: A Comparison of Recidivism Patterns Among Four Successive Parolee Cohorts. New York: Springer-Verlag.
- 1994 James Marquart, Sheldon Ekland-Olson and Jon Sorensen. The Rope, The Chair and The Needle: Capital Punishment in Texas 1923-1990. Austin, Texas: University of Texas Press.
- 2011 Sheldon Ekland-Olson. Who Lives, Who Dies, Who Decides? – Abortion, Neonatal Care, Assisted Dying, and Capital Punishment. New York: Routledge Hamilton Book Award
- 2012 Sheldon Ekland-Olson and Julie Beicken. How Ethical Systems Change: Eugenics, the Final Solution, Bioethics. New York: Routledge.
- 2012 Sheldon Ekland-Olson and Elyshia Aseltine. How Ethical Systems Change: Abortion and Neonatal Care. New York: Routledge.
- 2012 Sheldon Ekland-Olson and Elyshia Aseltine. How Ethical Systems Change: Tolerable Suffering and Assisted Dying. New York: Routledge.
- 2012 Sheldon Ekland-Olson and Danielle Dirks. How Ethical Systems Change: Lynching and Capital Punishment. New York: Routledge.
- 2013 Sheldon Ekland-Olson. Life and Death Decisions: The Quest for Morality and Justice. New York: Routledge
- 2014 Sheldon Ekland-Olson. Who Lives, Who Dies, Who Decides? – Abortion, Neonatal Care, Assisted Dying, and Capital Punishment. New York: Routledge Revised Edition
- 2014 Sheldon Ekland-Olson. Life and Death Decisions: The Quest for Morality and Justice. New York: Routledge Revised Edition
- 2017 Sheldon Ekland-Olson and Jack P. Gibbs. Science and Sociology: Predictive Power is the Name of the Game. Routledge/Taylor Francis.
