= Jonathan Sorensen =

American university professor

- Born: October 10, 1965 (age 60)
- Education: Pan American University; Sam Houston State University
- Known for: Work on capital punishment in the United States
- Scientific career
- Fields: Sociology; Criminal justice
- Workplaces: East Carolina University; Prairie View A&M University; Vera Institute of Justice
- Thesis: The effects of legal and extra-legal factors on prosecutorial and jury decision making in post-Furman Texas capital cases (1990)

Jonathan Roger Sorensen (born October 10, 1965) is an American sociologist, criminologist, and professor in the Department of Criminal Justice at the East Carolina University College of Human Ecology. He is known for his research on capital punishment in the United States and how it can be influenced by extralegal factors such as victim race.
