= Brutalization =

Executions-homicide rate relationship

In criminology, brutalization refers to a hypothesized cause-and-effect relationship between executions and an increase in the homicide rate. This hypothesis proposes this relationship occurs because executions diminish the public's respect for life. Such an effect represents the opposite of a deterrent effect.

== Support ==
A 1980 study found that in New York, there were an average of two additional homicides in the month after an execution, consistent with a brutalization effect. A 1994 study found evidence of this effect in Oklahoma, but only in relation to stranger homicides, while a 1998 study found strong evidence to support a hypothesis relating to the total number of homicides in Oklahoma.

== Opposition ==
A 1978 study found no evidence to support the brutalization hypothesis. A 1994 study also found no evidence to support it with regards to overall homicides in Oklahoma.
