= Bigod's rebellion =

1537 Catholic uprising in England

- Part of European wars of religion and the English Reformation
Date	16 January – 10 February 1537
Location	Cumberland and Westmorland, England
Result	Royal victory; execution of many rebels

Belligerents
English Catholics	Kingdom of England

Commanders and leaders
Sir Francis Bigod (executed); Lord Darcy (executed); Lord Hussey (executed)	(Kingdom of England) King Henry VIII

Casualties and losses
216 executed	

Bigod's rebellion of January 1537 was an armed rebellion by English Catholics in Cumberland and Westmorland against King Henry VIII and the English Reformation Parliament. It was led by Sir Francis Bigod, of Settrington in the East Riding of Yorkshire.

== Prelude ==
Following the Pilgrimage of Grace of 1536, King Henry VIII had made promises which had not yet been kept, such as the holding of a Parliament in the North of England. Discontent over these false promises meant that, in January 1537, a new rising began to take shape, although Robert Aske (a leader of the Pilgrimage of Grace) tried to prevent it.

An undated letter from Aske to the Commons, probably early in 1537, tells them: "Neighbours, I do much [marvel] that ye would assemble yourselves with Bigod [seeing how] earnestly the King's highness extendeth general pardon to all this North". He goes on that the king intends to hold a parliament at York and to have his new wife, Jane Seymour, crowned. Bigod had intended to destroy the effect of previous petitions, but "as I hear you were forced to assemble by his threats and menaces, I shall declare this to the King, and fear not but that you shall have his Grace's pardon notwithstanding".

Lord Darcy wrote to Aske and Robert Constable on 17 January

Of Sir Fras. Bigod I heard, this day at dinner, as you wrote; and more, that Hallum was taken at Hull yesterday with a letter in his purse from Sir Francis Bigod promising that he and all the West Countries would rise and come forward. This day with my servant, Alan Gefreyson, I sent you my news which are of such bruits, rages, and furies as the like I have not read nor heard of. I sent to my cousin Ellerker and Whartton for the premises concerning Hull. My advice is that you stay the people till the coming of my lord of Norfolk, which, I hear, shall be shortly, and all the gentlemen that is above of the North with him. He brings gracious answers of the Parliament and petitions. Good Mr. Aske, where you write desiring me to stay my quarters; there has yet been no stir in my rooms and lands, but what was caused by other wild countries and dales. I shall do my duty, and play my part therein, though I lie in my bed. I hear my lord of Cumberland is likely to have business for two prisoners he keeps.

Bigod himself wrote to Constable on 18 January:

"Though the commons at first had me in suspicion for my learning and conversation with such a lewd one as they judged were enemies both to Christ's Church and the commonwealth, and I was even in danger of my life at Pountefrett, they have now the greatest confidence in me. Now messengers come from Bishopric, Richmondshire, and the West, for me to go forward with the commons, especially to bring John Halom, whom the mayor of Hull has imprisoned, to their great offence. I have sworn to go with the commons having good reason to doubt the Duke of Norfolk is coming rather to bring them to captivity like those of Lincolnshire than to fulfil our petitions. There is no man they trust so much as Constable whom Bygott would gladly join and follow his advice, if he will be true to them." He begs an answer and sends a copy of their oath.

William Todde, prior of Malton in Ryedale, later gave evidence that on the Tuesday before the uprising, Bigod had dined with him at Malton on his way to York. Bigod had shown him part of the King's pardon, saying it would enrage the Scots, known in the North as "our old ancient enemies", while Todde showed Bigod a copy of the articles given at Doncaster, Bigod asked for a copy, and one was sent after him. On leaving, Bigod said he had to go to Settrington to meet his brother Ralph.

== Rebellion ==
Bigod, fearing repression by the King, launched his uprising on 16 January 1537, in concert with his tenant, John Hallam, a yeoman of Watton. His efforts to promulgate his platform attracted little support, either from the aristocracy or the commons. His plan to have George Lumley seize Scarborough Castle and Hallam Hall on 16 January failed utterly, and his own assault on Kingston upon Hull on 19 January was forestalled by the capture of almost his entire force in a dawn raid at Beverley, Yorkshire. He escaped to Mulgrave, and from thence to Cumberland, where he was captured on 10 February, and sent to Carlisle Castle.

== Aftermath ==
In the aftermath of the rebellion's defeat, Henry arrested Bigod, Aske and several other rebels, including Darcy, Lord Hussey, the Chief Butler of England, Sir Thomas Percy and Sir Robert Constable. All were convicted of treason. On 2 June, 1537, Bigod was hanged, drawn and quartered at Tyburn, Darcy and Hussey both beheaded, Thomas Moigne, one of the members of Parliament for Lincoln, was hanged, drawn and quartered, Constable was hanged in chains at Hull, and Aske was hanged in chains at York. In all, 216 were executed: several lords and knights (including Sir Thomas Percy, Sir Stephen Hamerton, Sir William Lumley, Sir John Constable and Sir William Constable), six abbots (Adam Sedbar, Abbot of Jervaulx, William Trafford, Abbot of Sawley, Matthew Mackarel, Abbot of Barlings and Bishop of Chalcedon, William Thirsk, Abbot of Fountains and the Prior of Bridlington), 38 monks, and sixteen parish priests. Sir Nicholas Tempest, Bowbearer of the Forest of Bowland was hanged at Tyburn, Sir John Bulmer hanged, drawn and quartered, and his wife Margaret Stafford burnt at the stake. In late 1538, Sir Edward Neville, Keeper of the Sewer was beheaded.

The circumstances of their trial and execution were recorded by the author of Wriothesley's Chronicle:

Also the 16 day of May [1537] there were arraigned at Westminster afore the King's Commissioners, the Lord Chancellor that day being the chief, these persons following: Sir Robert Constable, knight; Sir Thomas Percy, knight, and brother to the Earl of Northumberland; Sir John Bulmer, knight, and Ralph Bulmer, his son and heir; Sir Francis Bigod, knight; Margaret Cheney, after Lady Bulmer by untrue matrimony; George Lumley, esquire; Robert Aske, gentleman, that was captain in the insurrection of the Northern men; and one Hamerton, esquire, all which persons were indicted of high treason against the King, and that day condemned by a jury of knights and esquires for the same, whereupon they had sentence to be drawn, hanged and quartered, but Ralph Bulmer, the son of John Bulmer, was reprieved and had no sentence.

And on the 25 day of May, being the Friday in Whitsun week, Sir John Bulmer, Sir Stephen Hamerton, knights, were hanged and headed; Nicholas Tempest, esquire; Doctor Cockerell, priest; Abbot quondam of Fountains; and Doctor Pickering, friar, were drawn from the Tower of London to Tyburn, and there hanged, bowelled and quartered, and their heads set on London Bridge and divers gates in London.

And the same day Margaret Cheney, 'other wife to Bulmer called', was drawn after them from the Tower of London into Smithfield, and there burned according to her judgment, God pardon her soul, being the Friday in Whitsun week; she was a very fair creature, and a beautiful.
