= John Hallam (died 1537) =

English political leader

John Hallam (died 1537), conspirator, was a native of Cawkeld, Yorkshire, and had much local influence and popularity.

== Life ==
A determined Romanist, he strenuously opposed King Henry VIII's supremacy and the suppression of the monasteries.

The "Act of Convocation for the Abrogation of Certain Holydays" was passed in August 1536. When the priest at Kilnick announced that the king had suppressed St. Wilfrid's Day, Hallam angrily protested, and persuaded the villagers to keep the feast. When the news of the Pilgrimage of Grace in Lincolnshire (1536) arrived, Hallam, who was at Beverley, read Robert Aske's proclamation, exhorting the people of the East Riding to restore the old religion and re-establish the monasteries, and took the pilgrim's oath himself. He was made one of the captains of the rebel forces between Beverley and Duffield, (Note: Duffield is probably an error for Driffield.) and marched with the Beverley contingent under William Stapleton to capture Hull. Hallam remained there as governor; but when the rebellion was suppressed he was ousted by Rogers, the mayor, and Alderman Eland, both being knighted for their services. Hallam shared in the general pardon, but in January 1537 he, with Sir Francis Bigod and others, concocted the second pilgrimage. From Settrington, their headquarters, Bigod marched to Beverley, and Hallam to Hull, which place he and his followers entered on market day disguised as farmers. They were discovered and pursued. Hallam was captured and dragged inside the Beverley gate just as Bigod's troop arrived. He was summarily tried, convicted, and hanged in January 1537.

[Ross's Celebrities of the Yorkshire Wolds, 1878, p. 71; Oldmixon's History, 1839, i. 102; Stow's Chronicle, p. 573; Hall's Chronicle, p. 239; Rapin, i. 815; Sheahan and Whellan's History of Yorkshire, i. 189.]
