= Thomas Darcy, 1st Baron Darcy de Darcy =

English nobleman

Thomas Darcy
- Baron Darcy of Darcy
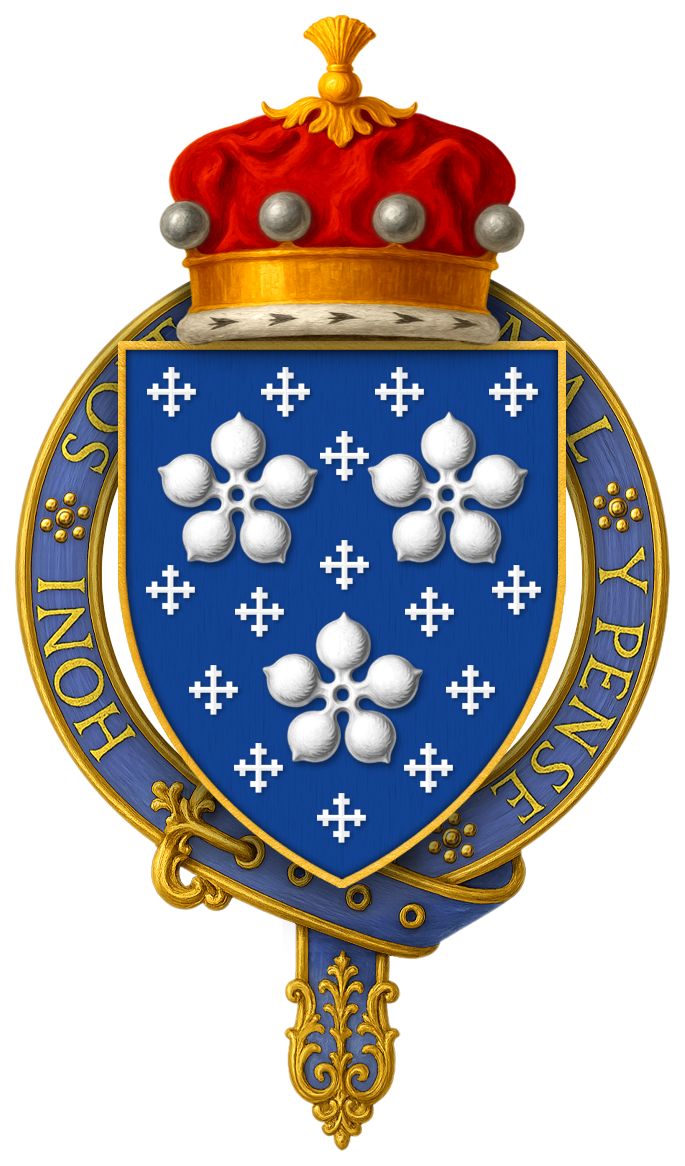
- Arms of Lord Darcy
- Born: c. 1467
- Died: 30 June 1537 (aged 69–70); Tower Hill, London
- Buried: St Botolph's Aldgate, London; 51.513889°N 0.076111°W
- Noble family: Darcy
- Spouses: Dousabella Tempest; Edith Sandys
- Issue: George Darcy, 1st Baron Darcy of Aston; Richard Darcy; Sir Arthur Darcy; Mabel Darcy; Elizabeth Darcy
- Father: Sir William Darcy
- Mother: Euphemia Langton

Thomas Darcy, 1st Baron Darcy of Darcy or of Temple Hurst (c. 1467 – 30 June 1537) was an English nobleman, the only son, and heir, of Sir William Darcy (1443 – 30 May 1488) and his wife, Euphemia Langton, the daughter of Sir John Langton. Darcy was opposed to the Dissolution of the monasteries, and for his role in the Pilgrimage of Grace was convicted of high treason for delivering up Pontefract Castle to the rebels. He was executed on Tower Hill 30 June 1537.

== Family ==
The Darcy family had held lands in Lincolnshire since the Domesday survey, wherein it appears that one Norman de Areci held thirty lordships in that county by William the Conqueror's gift. A little later the name became d'Arci, later d'Arcy and finally Darcy. In the reign of Edward III they acquired by marriage other possessions in various counties, among which was the family seat of Templehurst (or Temple Hurst), near Selby in Yorkshire. Sir William Darcy died on 30 May 1488, leaving his only son and heir Thomas who was over twenty-one years of age.

== Marriage and issue ==
He married as his first wife Dousabella Tempest (died before 1500), daughter and heiress of Sir Richard Tempest of Ribblesdale, North Riding of Yorkshire and Mabel, daughter of Walter Strickland. They had three sons and a daughter:

- George Darcy, 1st Baron Darcy of Aston (died 28 Aug 1558) married Dorothy Melton (died 21 Sep 1557), daughter of John Melton of Aston and Katherine, daughter of Hugh Hastings. He was knighted 9 September 1513 at Flodden.
- Richard Darcy
- Sir Arthur Darcy (died 3 Apr 1561) married Mary Carew, daughter of Sir Nicolas Carew. He was knighted in 1523.
- Mabel Darcy

A letter signed "D. Darcy", believed to have been written by Dousabella to her husband in January 1537, appears actually to have been written by Dorothy, the wife of George Darcy.

In or before 1500 he married Edith Sandys (died 22 August 1529), daughter of Sir William Sandys and Edith Cheyne, daughter of Sir John Cheyne and widow of Ralph, Lord Neville (died 1498), son of Ralph Neville, 3rd Earl of Westmorland. They had a daughter:

- Elizabeth Darcy (c. 1501 – ) married 26 Apr 1514 Sir Marmaduke Constable (c.1498 – 20 Apr 1560)

Through this marriage, Darcy became stepfather to Ralph Neville, 4th Earl of Westmorland.

His wife died at Stepney on 22 August 1529, and was buried at the Friars Observant, Greenwich.

== Career ==
It is evident that Darcy's early career chiefly involved his military abilities and he had distinguished himself in the reign of Henry VII.

Some of the honours he achieved and the offices that he held included:

- Knighthood 1489
- Knight Banneret 1497
- Constable of Bamburgh Castle 1498
- Captain of Berwick 1498–1515
- Treasurer of Berwick 1501
- Warden of the East Marches 1505
- Knight of the Garter 1509
- Warden of the Royal Forests, North of Trent 1509
- Baron Darcy (of Darcy or of Temple Hurst) by writ, 1509
- Warden of the East and Middle Marches 1511
- Privy Councillor 1513

=== Political advancement ===
In 1492 Darcy was bound by indenture to serve Henry VII beyond sea for a whole year with one thousand men, "himself having his costrel and page, 16 archers, and 4 bills, and 6 H." (apparently halberds) on foot. In the latter part of the same year, he attended the king at the reception of the French embassy sent to treat for peace. In 1496 he was indicted at quarter sessions in the West Riding for giving to various persons a token or livery called the Buck's Head. But next year he marched with Surrey to raise the siege of Norham Castle, and pursued King James IV on his retreat into Scotland. He was a knight for the king's body, and is so designated in the patent by which, on 8 June 1498, he was made constable and doorward of Bamburgh Castle in Northumberland. On 16 December of the same year he, being then captain of Berwick, was appointed deputy to Henry, Duke of York (then only 7 years old) who was warden of the east and middle marches. While thus engaged on the borders he had a good deal of correspondence with Henry's able minister Fox, Bishop of Durham, whose bishopric lay continually open to invasion.

In the same year, 1498, he was one of three commissioners appointed to assess fines on those who had taken part in the revolt on behalf of Perkin Warbeck in the previous year in Devon and Cornwall. He was also one of three appointed for a like purpose (but apparently two years later) for the counties of Somerset, Dorset, Wiltshire, and Hampshire, and he himself had a special commission to execute the offices of constable and marshal of England on those who refused to compound. On 6 July 1499 he was appointed one of five ambassadors to settle disputes with Scotland. Besides being captain of Berwick, he was on 10 September 1501 appointed treasurer and chamberlain of that town, and customer of the port there. In the latter part of the year 1502, he and Henry Babington were despatched into Scotland to receive the oath of James IV to a treaty of peace, which they accordingly did at Glasgow on 10 December.

Shortly before this, in 1499/1500, he was appointed by the crown as constable and steward of Sheriff Hutton; and afterwards, on 12 July 1503, as receiver-general of the lordships, castles, and manors of Sheriff Hutton, Middleham, and Richmond in Yorkshire. On 8 June 1505 we first find him named Lord Darcy in a patent by which he was made steward of the lands of Raby and other possessions of the young Earl of Westmorland, then a minor. These offices, together with his new peerage, must have given him an influence in the north of England second only to that of the Earl of Northumberland, when on 1 September 1505 he was appointed warden of the east marches, a higher office in dignity than he had yet held, though he had discharged its duties before as deputy to another.

In 1508 he was one of fifteen lords bound by the treaty for the marriage of the king's daughter Mary with Charles of Castile (afterwards Emperor Charles V) that that marriage should be completed when the bride came to marriageable age. He was also one of the witnesses of the celebration of the match by proxy at Richmond on 17 December following. Just after the accession of Henry VIII in the following spring, he was made a knight of the Garter. He was installed on 21 May. Some changes were then made in his appointments and he gave up the constableship and stewardship of Sheriff Hutton, which were given to Sir Richard Cholmeley in his place. But most of the others were renewed, especially his commission as warden of the east marches and captain of Berwick. For these and a number of other offices new patents were granted to him on 18 June 1509, on which day he was also appointed warden, chief justice, and Justice in Eyre of forests beyond Trent. He was also named to the king's council, and when in London he took part in its deliberations, and signed warrants as a privy councillor. His name stood first in the commission of array for Northumberland; and when the bridge at Newcastle upon Tyne had to be repaired it was to be done under the supervision of Darcy and the prior of Durham.

On 17 October 1509, Darcy was summoned to parliament and was created Baron Darcy de Darcy. The same year he also was invested as Knight of the Order of the Garter (KG).

=== Foreign expeditions ===
In 1511 Darcy was sent to Spain at his own request to aid Ferdinand in his war against the Moors, the Spanish king having solicited the aid of fifteen hundred English archers. On 8 March, or rather apparently on the 28th, he received his commission from Henry VIII to serve as Ferdinand's admiral, and on the 29th Lord Willoughby de Broke and others were commissioned to muster men for him. The expedition sailed from Plymouth in May and arrived at Cádiz on 1 June. But no sooner had the troops landed than misunderstandings arose between them and the natives, and Ferdinand politely intimated that their services would not be required, as he had made a truce with the Moors in expectation of a war with France. Darcy, much disgusted, re-embarked on 17 June and returned home. On 3 August he had only reached Cape St. Vincent, where he was obliged to give out of his own money £20 to each of his captains for the victualling of his men; but apparently, this was repaid a year after his return home by the Spanish ambassador, who in a letter of Wolsey's dated 30 September is said to have 'dealt liberally with Lord Darcy in the matter of his soldiers'.

Soon after his return, on 20 October 1511, he was appointed warden both of the east and middle marches against Scotland, which office, however, he resigned in or before December, when Lord Dacre was appointed warden in his place. In 1512 and 1513 he wrote to the king and Wolsey important information about what was happening in Scotland and upon the borders. In the summer of 1513 he accompanied the king in the invasion of France, and was at the siege of Thérouanne. In January following he writes from his own house at Templehurst an interesting letter to Wolsey, in which he speaks of having recovered from recent sickness, says that his expeditions to Spain and France had cost him £4,000 in three years and a half, but declares his willingness to serve the king beyond sea in the following summer. He reminds Wolsey (whose growing influence at this time was marked by everyone) how they had been bedfellows at court and had freely spoken to each other about their own private affairs, and how Wolsey when abroad with the king in the preceding year regretted that Darcy had not been appointed marshal of the army at the beginning of the campaign.

=== Further public service ===
In 1514/5 his son and heir apparent, Sir George Darcy, was included with him in some of the appointments he then held. In 1515 he gave up the captaincy of Berwick, and was succeeded by Sir Anthony Ughtred. He appears to have attended parliament in that year, and to have been present in London at the reception of Wolsey's cardinal's hat in November. In May 1516 he witnessed a decree in the Star Chamber. A year later he received Henry VIII's sister Margaret, the widow of James IV, at her entry into Yorkshire on her return to Scotland. In July 1518 he was one of those who met Cardinal Campeggio on his first mission to England, two miles out of London. A year later, a privy search having been ordered to be made throughout London and the neighbourhood for suspicious characters, Darcy and Sir John Nevill were appointed to conduct it in Stepney and the eastern suburbs. In 1519 he attended the feast of St. George on 28 and 29 May. In March 1520 he resigned his offices in Sheriff Hutton to his friend, Sir Robert Constable, whom he familiarly called his brother, in whose favour a new patent was granted by the king. His name occurs shortly afterwards in various lists of persons to accompany the king to the Field of the Cloth of Gold; but it is more than doubtful whether he went there, seeing that on 29 June, just after the interview, he and Lord Berners waited on three French gentlemen and conducted them to see the princess at Richmond, though their arrival the day before was only notified a few hours in advance by letters from Wolsey, who was still at Guisnes.

In 1523 he took an active part in the war against Scotland, making various raids on the borders with a retinue of 1,750 men. In the same year he obtained a principal share in the wardship of the son and heir of Lord Monteagle, which led to many complaints from one of the executors named Richard Bank. On 12 February 1525, he was again appointed to conduct a privy search at Stepney. The annual revenue of his lands in various counties is given in a contemporary document as £1,834 4s., and he was taxed for the first and second payment of the subsidy at no less than £1,050.

=== Wolsey’s downfall ===
In 1529 Darcy prepared the way for his old comrade Wolsey's fall by drawing up a long paper of accusations against him, in which he professed that his motive was "only for to discharge my oath and most bounden duty to God and the king, and of no malice". In the same year, he was one of the many witnesses examined on the king's behalf as to the circumstances of Prince Arthur's marriage with Catherine of Aragon, though he had limited evidence to give up on the subject, having been at that time in the king's service in the north of England.

He was one of the peers who signed the articles prepared against Wolsey in parliament on 1 December, partly founded on the charges drawn up by himself five months before; and in the following year, he signed the memorial of the lords spiritual and temporal of England to Pope Clement VII, warning him of the danger of not gratifying the desire of Henry VIII in the matter of the divorce.

=== Opposition to the king ===
It was not long, however, before Darcy became a rather marked opponent of the court in reference to this very subject. In the parliament which met in January 1532 the Duke of Norfolk made a speech, declaring how ill-treated the king had been by the pope not remitting the cause to be tried in England, adding that it was maintained by some that matrimonial causes were a matter of temporal jurisdiction, of which the king was the head and not the pope, and finally asking whether they would not employ their persons and goods in defence of the royal prerogative against interference from abroad. To this appeal, Darcy was the first to reply. He said his person and goods were at the king's disposal, but as to matrimonial causes he had always understood that they were spiritual and belonged to ecclesiastical jurisdiction; and if the question presented any difficulties it was for the king's council first to say what should be done without involving others in their responsibility. After this, it is not surprising to learn that among other peers who were treated in a similar manner he was informed that his presence in the January session of 1534 would be dispensed with, although he had received a regular summons to attend.

Among matters of minor interest about this period, we find him reminding Bishop Tunstall after his promotion to Durham of a promise of the offices of steward and sheriff of his bishopric. A long-standing dispute with his neighbours at Rothwell in Yorkshire comes to light in a commission obtained in April 1533 to examine certain of the inhabitants who had threatened, in defiance of a decree of the Chancellor of the Duchy of Lancaster, to pull down the gates and hedges of Rothwell park.

In July 1534 he was one of the jury of peers who acquitted Lord Dacre, an act which did little to make him more acceptable to the court. Thomas Cromwell, however, appears to have been his friend (although at the end of his life Darcy showed his deep hatred of and contempt for Cromwell) and obtained for his second son, Sir Arthur Darcy, the office of captain or governor of Jersey in September following, for whose appointment he wrote Cromwell a letter of thanks from Mortlake, regretting that he was unable to visit him personally, owing to his "fulsum diseassis." It appears that he was suffering from a rupture. He at the same time sent Sir Arthur with messages both to Cromwell and to the Duke of Norfolk, among other things complaining that he had not been allowed to go home into Yorkshire since the parliament began. And this must mean since November 1529 when the still existing parliament began, not since the beginning of a session, for it was then vacation time. A significant part of the instructions to Sir Arthur as regards the Duke of Norfolk was to deliver a letter to him "for no goodness in him but to stop his evil tongue."

== Rebel ==
In the same month in which his son was appointed captain of Jersey, Darcy began to hold secret communications with Eustace Chapuys, the imperial ambassador, along with Lord Hussey, whom he called his brother, to invite the emperor to invade England and put an end to what he described as a tyranny in matters secular and religious, which the nation endured only because there was no deliverer. His earnest application for leave to go home was with a view to aid the invaders when this scheme should be set on foot, and he actually succeeded in obtaining a licence to absent himself from future feasts of St. George on account of his age and debility. On the same day (28 October) he also obtained a licence of absence from future meetings of parliament and exemption from serving on any commission, but the latter did not pass the great seal till 12 February following.

For these important privileges he writes to thank Cromwell on 13 November, dating his letter from Templehurst, where, however, he could hardly have been at that time, as Chapuys expressly says on 1 January 1535 that he had not yet been allowed to retire to his own country. The hope of soon going home to Templehurst seems to have influenced his pen to write as if he were actually there when he really was in or about London. The fact is that, although these exemptions were conceded to him on the ground of age and infirmity, permission to go back to his home in Yorkshire was still persistently withheld. The court apparently suspected that his presence in the north would do them little good, and he remained not only till the beginning of 1535, but through most part of the year, if not the whole of it. He kept up secret communications with Chapuys at intervals in January, March, May, and July, hoping now and again that matters were ripe for a great revolt, and sending the ambassador symbolic presents when he dared not express his meaning otherwise. At the beginning of May, he was hopeful at last of being allowed to go home immediately. But in the middle of the month, this hope having apparently disappeared, he was thinking about how to escape abroad and endeavour to impress upon the emperor in a personal interview the urgent necessity of sending an expedition against England to redeem the country from what he described as the heresy, oppression, and robbery to which it was constantly subjected. How long he was detained in London we do not know, but it was certainly till after July. He appears to have been at Templehurst in April 1536; but there is a blank in our information as to the whole preceding interval.

His presence not being required in the parliamentary session of February 1536, he escaped the pressure which was doubtless brought to bear upon others to vote for the dissolution of the smaller monasteries, a measure which was very unpopular in the north of England, whatever it might be elsewhere. This, indeed, was one of the chief causes of that great rebellion which, beginning in Lincolnshire in October following, soon spread to Yorkshire, and was called the Pilgrimage of Grace.

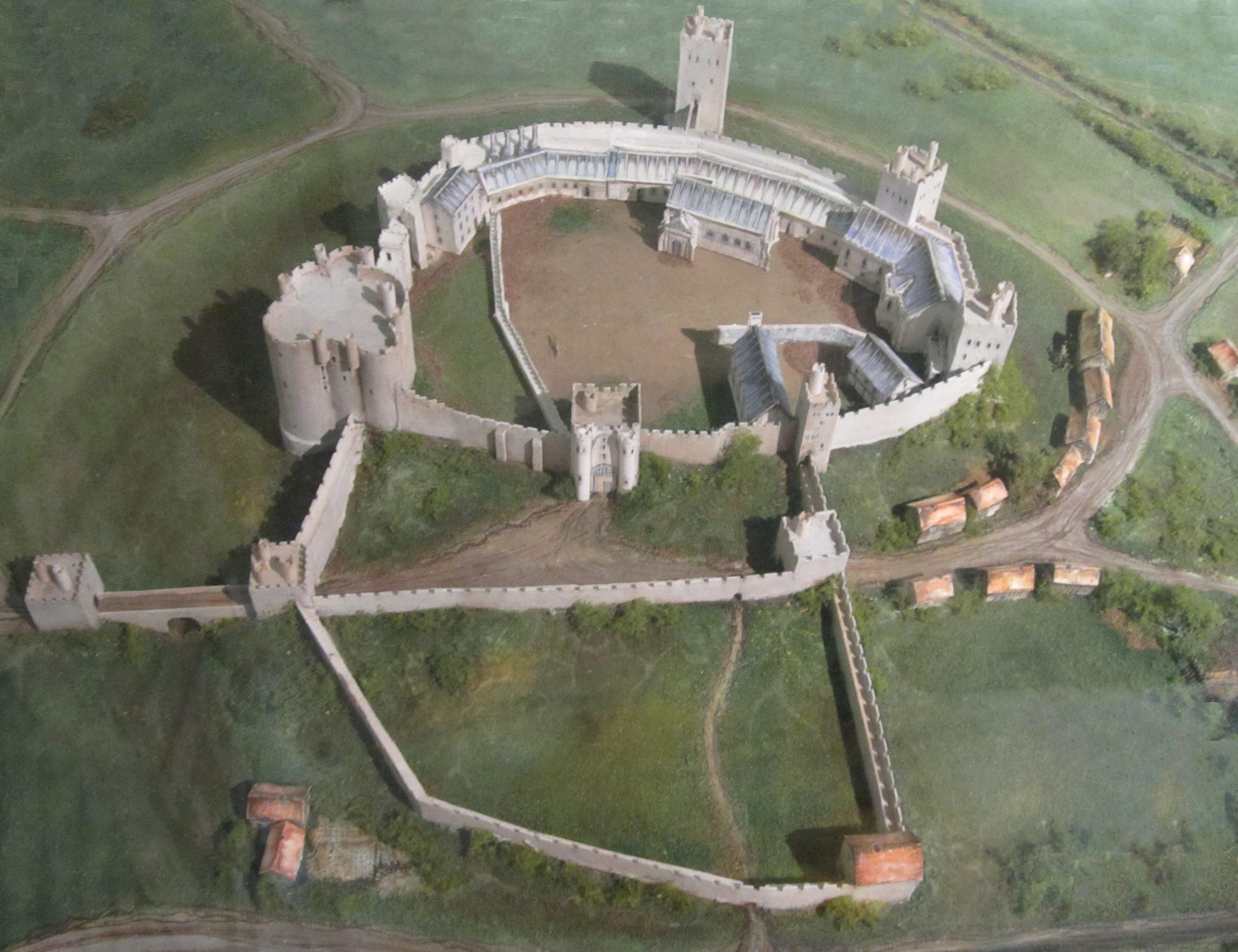
Reconstruction of Pontefract Castle

Almost the only place which seemed for a time to hold out against the insurgents was Pontefract Castle, of which Darcy held the command. Thither fled Archbishop Lee of York, who put himself under Darcy's protection with some of the neighbouring gentry. But Darcy, pretending that his provisions had run short, yielded up the castle to the rebels, who compelled him and the archbishop to be sworn to the common cause. The compulsion, however, was more ostensible than real. Darcy, the archbishop, and nearly all the gentry really sympathised with the insurgents, and it was in vain that Darcy afterwards pleaded that he was doing his utmost for the king by endeavouring to guide aright a power that he could not resist.

He stood by Robert Aske, the leader of the commons, when Lancaster Herald knelt before him, and he negotiated in their favour with the Dukes of Norfolk and Suffolk when they were sent down to suppress the rising. His position as a friend and leader of the insurgents was recognised by the king himself, who instructed Norfolk and Fitzwilliam to treat with him as such, and authorised them to give him and the others safe conduct if necessary, to come to his presence, or else to offer them a free pardon on their submission. Norfolk, presumably at the King's desire, wrote to Darcy suggesting that he could redeem himself by breaking his word to Aske and arresting him. Darcy, who prided himself on being true to his sworn word, replied indignantly: "Alas my good lord that ever you a man of so much honour and great experience should advise or choose me to ....betray or disserve any living man." Both he and Aske wrote to the king to set their conduct in a more favourable light. A meeting with some of the king's council was arranged at Doncaster, and the king sent a pardon even to the chief offenders. But on 6 January following (1537) Henry sent him an imperative summons to come up to London in reply to which he wrote from Templehurst on the 14th, stating that he had 'never fainted nor feigned' in the service of the king and his father within the realm or abroad for about fifty years; but since the meeting at Doncaster, he had been confined to his chamber with two diseases, rupture and flux, as several of the council who saw him at Doncaster and the king's own physicians could bear witness.

The country was at that moment in a very dangerous state, a new rebellion having been just begun by Sir Francis Bigod, which Aske and Darcy did their best to stay. Their services were so real that the king pardoned both of them, and encouraged Darcy to victual Pontefract, that his two sons, Sir George and Sir Arthur, might keep it in case of a new rising. Darcy was further assured, by letters addressed to the Earl of Shrewsbury, that if he would do his duty thenceforward it would be as favourably considered as if he had never done amiss. Encouraged by this he wrote to Aske on 10 February, asking him to redeliver secretly to Pontefract Castle (for the custody of which Darcy was responsible) all the bows and arrows that he had obtained out of it. The letter unluckily was intercepted, and it told a tale.

Information was collected to show that since his pardon Darcy had been guilty of different acts of treason, among which his intimating to the people that there would be a free parliament to consider their grievances was cited in evidence that he was still seeking to promote a change, and that if there were no parliament the rebellious spirit would revive with his approval. Even his recent acts in the king's behalf were construed to his disadvantage; for having given orders to stay the commons till Norfolk came, the words were taken to imply that he only wished them pacified for a season.

== Arrest, trial and execution ==
Darcy was apprehended, brought up to London, and lodged in the Tower of London, as were several other of the northern leaders at the same time.

Examined by the Privy Council, Darcy used the occasion to make clear his hatred and contempt for Thomas Cromwell: "thou that art the very original and chief causer of this rebellion and mischief and likewise art the cause of apprehension to us that be noblemen and dost earnestly travail to bring us to our end and strike off our heads". He warned Cromwell, prophetically, that he must not count on the King's favour towards him lasting, for: "others that have been in such favour with Kings that you now enjoy have come to the same end you bring me to" and expressed his hope that even if Cromwell struck off every nobleman's head, "yet one (i.e. the King) shall remain that shall strike off yours".

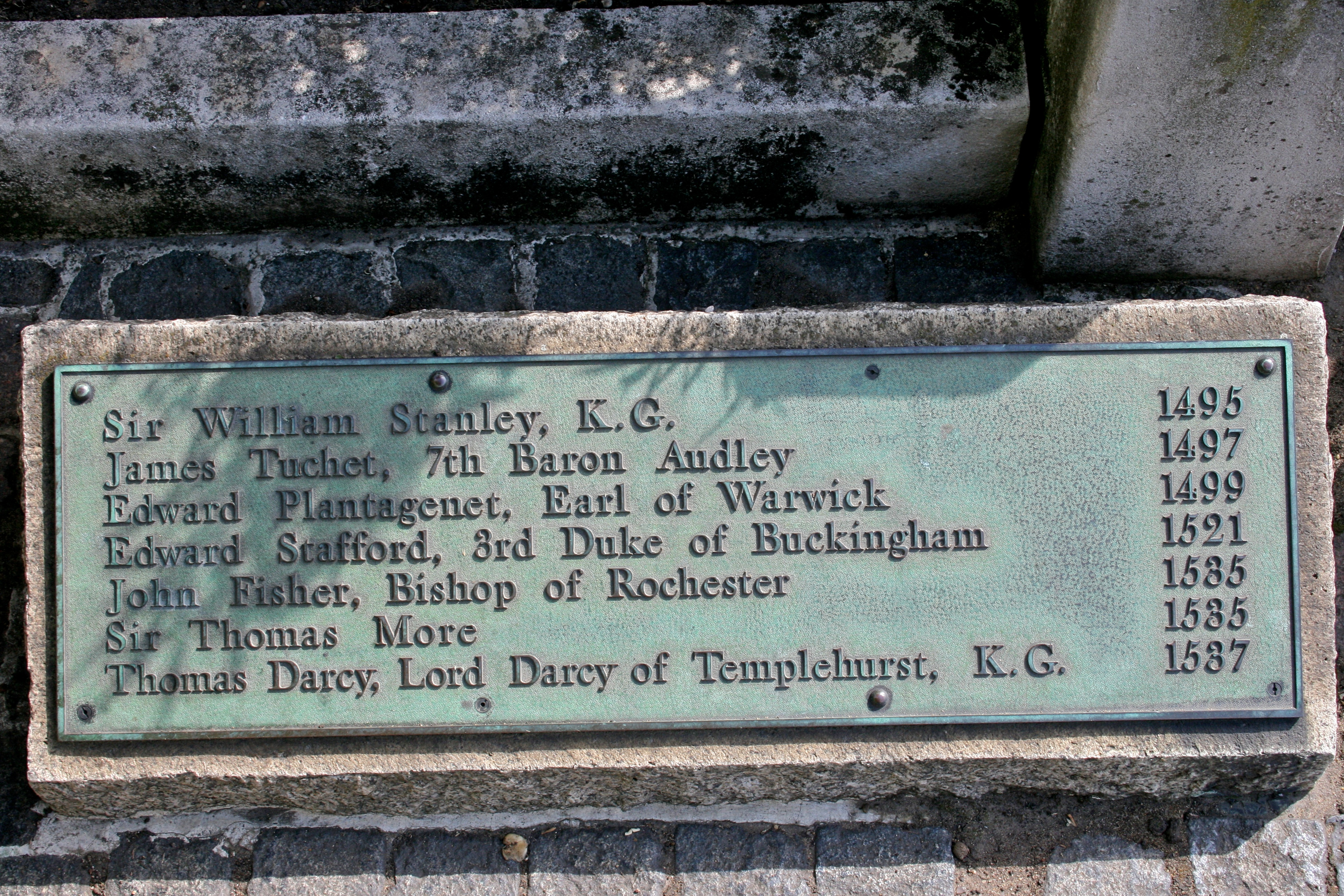
Sign at the Tower Hill scaffold location

An indictment found against Darcy and the other northern leaders on 9 May at York says that they had conspired together in October, first to deprive the king of his royal dignity by disowning his title of Supreme Head of the Church of England, and secondly to compel him to hold a parliament; that they had afterwards committed diverse acts of rebellion; that after being pardoned they had corresponded with each other, and that Darcy and others had abetted Bigod's rebellion in January. On these charges he and his old friend, John Hussey, 1st Baron Hussey of Sleaford were arraigned at Westminster on 15 May before the Marquess of Exeter as Lord High Steward, and a number of their peers.

They were condemned to suffer the extreme penalty for treason, but the punishment actually inflicted upon them was decapitation, which Lord Hussey underwent at Lincoln, where he was conveyed on purpose to strike terror where the insurrection had begun. But Darcy was beheaded on Tower Hill on 30 June. His head was set up on London Bridge, and his body, according to one contemporary writer, was buried at Crutched Friars. But if so, it must have been removed afterwards; at least, if a tombstone inscription may be trusted, it lies with the bodies of other Darcys in the church of St Botolph's Aldgate.

Restitution in Blood of Sir George Darcy Act 1548
- Act of Parliament
- Parliament of the United Kingdom
- Long title: An Act for the Restitution in Blood of Sir George Darcie, Knight.
- Citation: 2 & 3 Edw. 6. c. 2 Pr. (Note: This is the citation in The Statutes of the Realm.); 2 & 3 Edw. 6. c. 41 Pr. (Note: This is the citation in The Statutes at Large.)
- Territorial extent: England and Wales

Dates
- Royal assent: 14 March 1549
- Commencement: 24 November 1548 (Note: Start of session.)

Status: Current legislation

Following his arrest and conviction in 1537, his lands and property were seized, and in 1539 he was posthumously attainted, the barony was forfeited and his knighthood degraded. During the reign of Edward VI, his eldest son, Sir George Darcy, was restored in blood, by an Act of Parliament, in 1548, to the dignity of Baron Darcy. Although he never regained any of his father's lands, the title of Lord Darcy of Aston descended to his male heirs until it became extinct for lack of issue in 1635.

== Fictional portrayals ==
Thomas Darcy was portrayed by Colm Wilkinson in the Showtime series The Tudors.

== Sources ==
- Cokayne, G. E. (1916). Gibbs, Vicary (ed.). The Complete Peerage of England, Scotland, Ireland, Great Britain and the United Kingdom, Extant, Extinct, or Dormant. Vol. IV (new ed.). London: The St. Catherine Press.
- Collins, Francis (1887). "Yorkshire Fines: 1500-1505". Feet of Fines of the Tudor period [Yorks]. Vol. 1: 1486-1571. pp. 14–20.
- Farrer, William; Brownbill, J., eds. (1911). "Townships: Little and Darcy Lever". A History of the County of Lancaster. Vol. 5. British-history.ac.uk. pp. 262–266.
- Flower, William (1881). Charles Best Norcliffe (ed.). The Visitation of Yorkshire in the years 1563 and 1564, Made by William Flower, Esquire, Norroy King of Arms. The Publications of the Harleian Society. Vol. XVI. London: Harleian Society.
- Foster, Joseph (1874). Pedigrees of the County Families of Yorkshire. Vol. III:North and East Riding. London: W. Wilfred Head.
- Gairdner, James (1888). "Darcy, Thomas". In Stephen, Leslie (ed.). Dictionary of National Biography. Vol. 14. London: Smith, Elder & Co. pp. 49–53.
- Hoyle, R. W. (January 2008) [2004]. "Darcy, Thomas, Baron Darcy of Darcy (b. in or before 1467, d. 1537)". Oxford Dictionary of National Biography (online ed.). Oxford University Press. doi:10.1093/ref:odnb/7148. (Subscription, Wikipedia Library access or UK public library membership required.)
- Ledward, K. H., ed. (1955). Calendar of the Close Rolls Preserved in the Public Record Office. Vol. 1: 1485-1500. London: Her Majesty's Stationery Office. pp. 354–355. OCLC 2117199 – via HathiTrust.
- "Letters and Papers, Foreign and Domestic, Henry VIII".
- Moorhouse, Geoffrey (2003). The Pilgrimage of Grace, 1536-7: The Rebellion That Shook Henry VIII's Throne. London: Phoenix. ISBN 9781842126660.
- Richardson, Douglas (2011). Everingham, Kimball G. (ed.). Magna Carta Ancestry: A Study in Colonial and Medieval Families. Vol. III (2nd ed.). CreateSpace. ISBN 978-1449966355.
- Shaw, W. A. (1906). The Knights of England. Vol. II. London: Sherrat and Hughes.
- "Sir Marmaduke Constable, Knight". Family Search: Community Trees. Europe: Royal and Noble Houses of Europe. Histfam.familysearch.org. Archived from the original on 3 March 2016.
- Stapleton, Thomas, ed. (1839). Plumpton Correspondence: A Series of Letters, Chiefly Domestick, Written in the Reigns of Edward IV, Richard III, Henry VII, and Henry VIII. Camden Society. Publications. Vol. IV. London: John Bowyer Nichols and Son.
- Thorpe, S. M. (1982). "Constable, Sir Marmaduke II (by 1498-1560), of London and Nuneaton, Warws.". In Bindoff, S. T. (ed.). The History of Parliament: the House of Commons 1509-1558. Historyofparliamentonline.org. Archived from the original on 21 February 2014.
- Wood, Mary Anne Everett (1846). Letters of Royal and illustrious Ladies from the Commencement of the Twelfth Century to the Close of the Reign of Queen Mary. Vol. II. London: Henry Colburn.
