= Thomas Moigne =

16th-century English politician

Thomas Moigne (by 1510 – 7 March 1537), of Willingham, Lincolnshire, was an English politician, executed for his part in the Lincolnshire Rising.

== Life ==
Moigne was the son of Alexander Moigne of Sixhills and Anne Copledike (daughter of John Copledike of Harrington). Thomas was educated at the Inner Temple.

He served as a justice of the peace for Lincolnshire (Kesteven in 1531 and Lindsey in 1531–32). He was the Recorder for Lincoln from 1532 until his death and Escheator for Lincolnshire in 1532–33. He was elected member (MP) of the parliament of England for Lincoln in 1536.

In the Lincolnshire Rising of 1536 he managed to escape capture at the sessions at Caistor, but was seized the next day at his home and forced to become a captain of the rebels. After the collapse of the uprising, forerunner of the Pilgrimage of Grace and Bigod's Rebellion, Moigne was arrested and taken to London. Most of those forced to take part were pardoned, but Moigne had been seen in friendly conversation with Robert Aske, leader of the rising in Yorkshire.

He was then returned to Lincoln, tried for treason on 6 March 1537 and sentenced to be hanged, drawn and quartered, which was carried out the following day. His lands were attainted (confiscated) but recovered by his younger brothers in 1544. He had married Bridget, the daughter of Sir William Hansard of South Kelsey and left two daughters. His widow married Vincent Grantham.
