= George Ashby =

George Ashby may refer to:

- George Ashby (martyr) (died 1537), martyred English Cistercian monk
- George Ashby (poet) (c. 1390–1475), English civil servant and poet
- George Ashby (MP) (1656–1728), English politician
- George Ashby (antiquary) (1724–1808), English antiquary
