= Gibbeting =

Display of executed criminals from a gallows-type structure

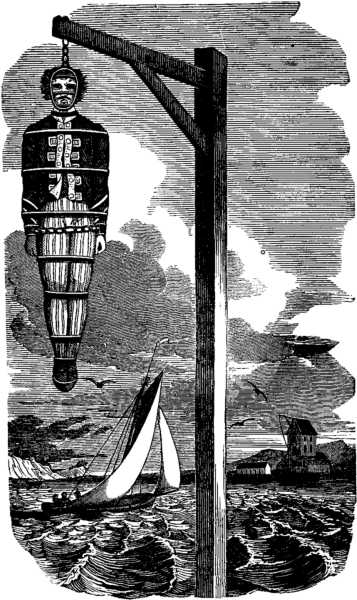
Captain Kidd, who was tried and executed for piracy, depicted hanging in chains

Gibbeting (/ˈdʒɪbɪtɪŋ/ JIB-et-ing), or hanging in chains, was the use of a gallows-type structure from which the dead or dying bodies of criminals were hanged on public display to deter other existing or potential criminals. Occasionally, the gibbet was also used as a method of public execution, with the criminal being left to die of exposure, thirst, and/or starvation.

== Display ==
Gibbeting was a common law punishment, which a judge could impose in addition to execution. As a sentence for murder, this practice was codified in England by the Murder Act 1751. It was most often used for traitors, robbers, murderers, highwaymen, and pirates and was intended to discourage others from committing similar offences. The structures were therefore often placed next to public highways (frequently at crossroads) and waterways.

Exhibiting a body could backfire against a monarch, especially if the monarch was unpopular. The rebels Henry of Montfort and Henry of Wylynton, enemies of Edward II, were drawn and hanged before being exhibited on a gibbet near Bristol. However, the people made relics of these bloody and mutilated remains out of respect and later used the relics in violent protest. Miracles were even reported at the spot where the bodies were hanging.

Although the intention was deterrence, the public response was complex. Samuel Pepys expressed disgust at the practice. There was Christian objection that prosecution of criminals should end with their death. The sight and smell of decaying corpses was offensive and regarded as "pestilential", so it was seen as a threat to public health.

Pirates were sometimes executed by hanging on a gibbet erected close to the low-water mark by the sea or a tidal section of a river. Their bodies would be left dangling until they had been submerged by the tide three times. In London, Execution Dock is located on the north bank of the River Thames in Wapping; after tidal immersion, particularly notorious criminals' bodies could be hung in cages a little farther downstream at either Cuckold's Point or Blackwall Point, as a warning to other waterborne criminals of the possible consequences of their actions (such a fate befell Captain William Kidd in May 1701). There were objections that these displays offended foreign visitors and did not uphold the reputation of the law, though the scenes even became gruesome tourist attractions.

== Historical examples ==
=== Antiquity ===
The Old Testament and Torah law forbid gibbeting beyond sunrise of the next day that the body is hanged on the tree. Public crucifixion with prolonged display of the body after death can be seen as a form of gibbeting. Gibbeting was one of the methods said by Tacitus and Cassius Dio to have been used by Boudica's army in the massacre of Roman settlers in the destruction of Camulodunum (Colchester), Londinium (London) and Verulamium (St. Albans) in AD 60–61.

=== Bermuda ===
During the 17th and 18th centuries, gibbets were a common sight in Bermuda. Located in Smith's Parish at the entrance to Flatt's Inlet is Gibbet Island, which was used to hang the bodies of escaped slaves as a deterrent to others. The small island was used for this purpose because it was not on the mainland and therefore satisfied the beliefs of locals who did not want gibbets near their homes.

=== Canada ===
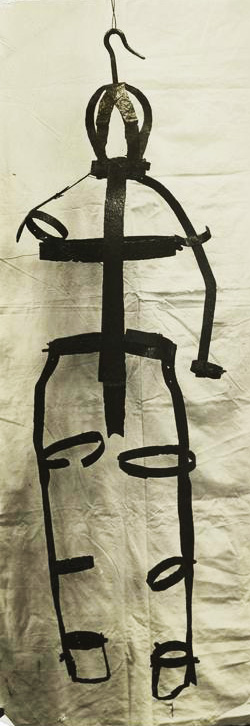
The gibbet in which Marie-Josephte Corriveau was exhibited after her execution, the "cage" of La Corriveau

Marie-Josephte Corriveau (1733–1763), better known as "La Corriveau", is one of the most popular figures in Québécois folklore. She lived in New France, was sentenced to death by a military tribunal of twelve British officers for the murder of her second husband, was hanged for it, and her body hung in chains. Her story has become legendary in Quebec, and she is the subject of numerous books and plays.

During the Napoleonic Wars, the Royal Navy used Hangman's Beach on McNab's Island in Halifax Harbour to display the hanged bodies of deserters, in order to deter the crews of passing warships.

=== Colony of New South Wales ===
Pinchgut Island (originally Mat-te-wan-ye in the local Aboriginal language; later, Rock Island when renamed by Governor Arthur Phillip), a rocky outcrop within Port Jackson, is the location of Fort Denison and a former gibbeting site. Thomas Hill, a convict, was sentenced to a week on the rock in iron chains with only bread and water to consume; these conditions are said to have "literally pinched his gut", giving the island its current name. The rock was levelled in the 1790s, and a gibbet installed in 1796. Another convict, Francis Morgan, was sent to New South Wales for life following a murder conviction in 1793; he later killed again in 1796 and was hanged in chains on Pinchgut in November 1796. Morgan's dead body and, later, skeleton remained on display on the island for four years.

=== United Kingdom ===
Robert Aske, who led the rebellion against Henry VIII known as the Pilgrimage of Grace, was hanged in chains in 1537.

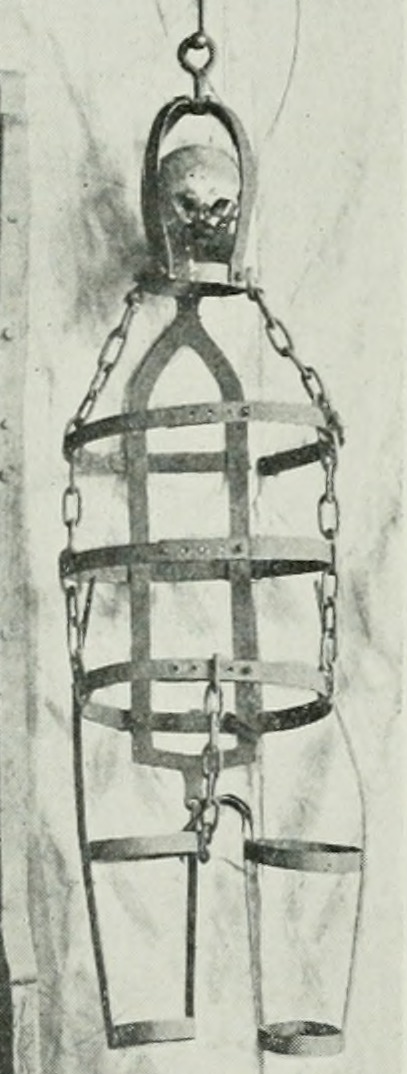
John Breads's Gibbet Iron, Rye, East Sussex

in March 1743 in the town of Rye, East Sussex, Allen Grebell was murdered by John Breads. Breads was imprisoned in the Ypres Tower and then hanged, after which his body was left to rot for more than 20 years in an iron cage on Gibbet Marsh. The cage, with Breads's skull clamped within the headframe, is still kept in the town hall.

In the United Kingdom, hanging in chains was a post-execution punishment for heinous crimes such as murder; smugglers were not usually hung in chains. However, during the mid eighteenth century a smuggling gang known as the Hawkhurst Gang operated along the south coast of England between Kent and Dorset; their violent crimes coincided with the authorities' desire to punish smugglers on the south coast and deter others from smuggling. Of the 75 members of the gang who were caught and convicted, 14 were sentenced to gibbeting. Unusually the bodies were distributed around the area as a deterrent, rather than near where they lived, or the scene of the crime.

=== Germany ===
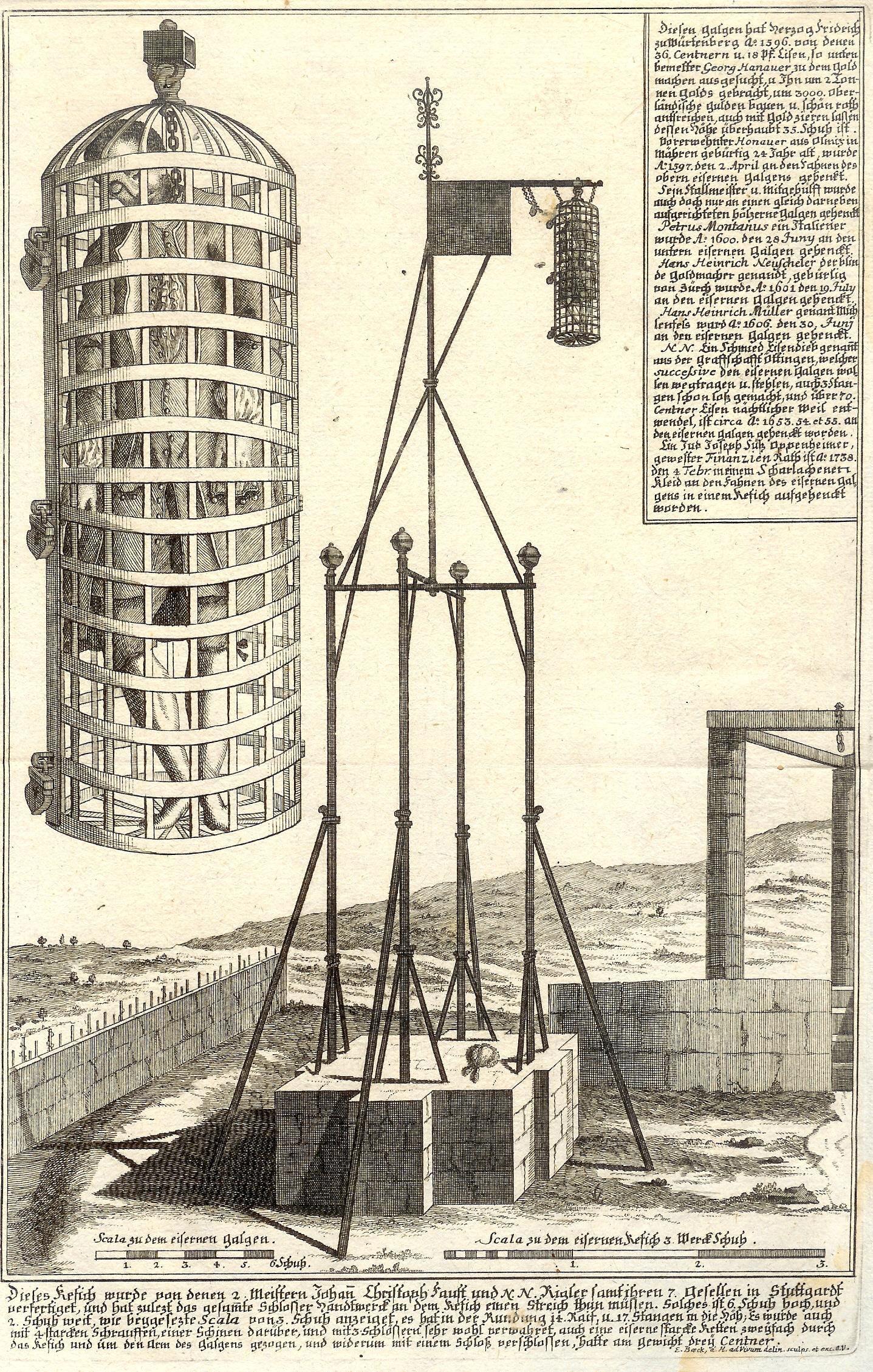
The body of Joseph Süß Oppenheimer in his gibbet cage in 1738

The leaders of the Anabaptist movement in Münster were executed in 1536; their dead bodies were gibbeted in iron cages hanging from the steeple of St. Lambert's Church, and the cages are still on display there today. Similarly, following his execution by hanging in 1738, the corpse of Jewish financier Joseph Süß Oppenheimer was gibbeted in a human-sized bird cage that hung outside of Stuttgart on the so-called Pragsattel (the public execution place at the time) for six years, until the inauguration of Karl Eugen, Duke of Württemberg, who permitted the hasty burial of his corpse under the gallows.

=== The Netherlands ===
After the siege and capture of the city of Zutphen in 1591 by the Anglo-Dutch army, the English dug up the body of the former English commander Rowland York and hanged and gibbeted it as a reminder of York's treachery in 1587. He had handed over the Zutphen sconce to the Spaniards after the English army under the Earl of Leicester was defeated by the Spaniards in the Battle of Zutphen.

=== Iran ===
In 838, the Iranian and Azerbaijani hero Babak Khorramdin had his hands and feet cut off by the Abbasid Caliphate and was then gibbeted alive while sewn into a cow's skin with the horns at ear level to crush his head gradually as the skin dried out.

=== Malta ===
On 4 February 1820, six British pirates were hanged on their vessel in the middle of the harbour at Valletta. Thereafter, their bodies were hung in gibbets erected at the bastions of Fort Ricasoli. Lieutenant Hobson of HMS Spey, in the tender Frederick, had apprehended them and their vessel in the harbour at Smyrna.

=== United States ===
During the colonial era, Bird Island and Nix's Mate island in Boston Harbor were used for gibbeting pirates and sailors executed for crimes in Massachusetts. Their bodies were left hanging as a warning to sailors coming into the harbor and approaching Boston. In 1755, a slave named Mark was hanged in Cambridge, Massachusetts, and then gibbeted in chains in Charlestown, Massachusetts; twenty years later, Paul Revere passed the remains of Mark on his famous ride.

Six men were executed by gibbeting under civil authority in the Southern Colonies. In Virginia, three men accused of piracy were executed by gibbeting in 1700. In South Carolina, three men were executed by gibbeting: one accused of poisoning in 1744, and two accused of murder in 1754 and 1759.

On display at the Atwater Kent Museum in Philadelphia, Pennsylvania is the gibbet iron of convicted pirate Thomas Wilkinson. The cage, created in 1781, was intended to display Wilkinson's body, so that sailors on passing ships might be warned of the consequences of piracy; Wilkinson's planned execution never took place, so the gibbet was never used.

There have been no recorded executions using this method under the authority of the United States. However, a gang of Cuban pirates were gibbeted in New York c. 1815.

== Last recorded gibbetings ==
=== Afghanistan ===
The January 1921 issue of The National Geographic Magazine contains two photographs of gibbet cages, referenced as "man-cages", in use in Afghanistan. Commentary included with the photograph indicates that the gibbet was a practice still in active use. Persons sentenced to death were placed alive in the cage and remained there until some undefined time weeks or months after their deaths.

=== Australia ===
In 1837, five years after the practice had ceased in England, the body of John McKay was gibbeted near the spot where he had murdered Joseph Wilson near Perth, in the colony of Van Diemen's Land. There was a great outcry, but the body was not removed until an acquaintance of Wilson passed the spot and, horrified by the spectacle of McKay's rotting corpse, pleaded with the authorities to remove it. The place where this occurred was just to the right (when travelling towards Launceston, not to be confused with the private road with the same name) on the Midlands Highway on the northern side of Perth.

In the Colony of Western Australia, gibbeting of executed Indigenous people continued into the mid-1850s. In 1855, Aboriginal men Yandan and Yoongal were executed in Perth for separate murders, with their bodies then "conveyed under escort to York, there to be suspended in some conspicuous part of the district, where such a spectacle would be likely to prove a warning, and prevent a repetition of the murders which have of late been prevalent in the neighbourhood".

=== United Kingdom ===
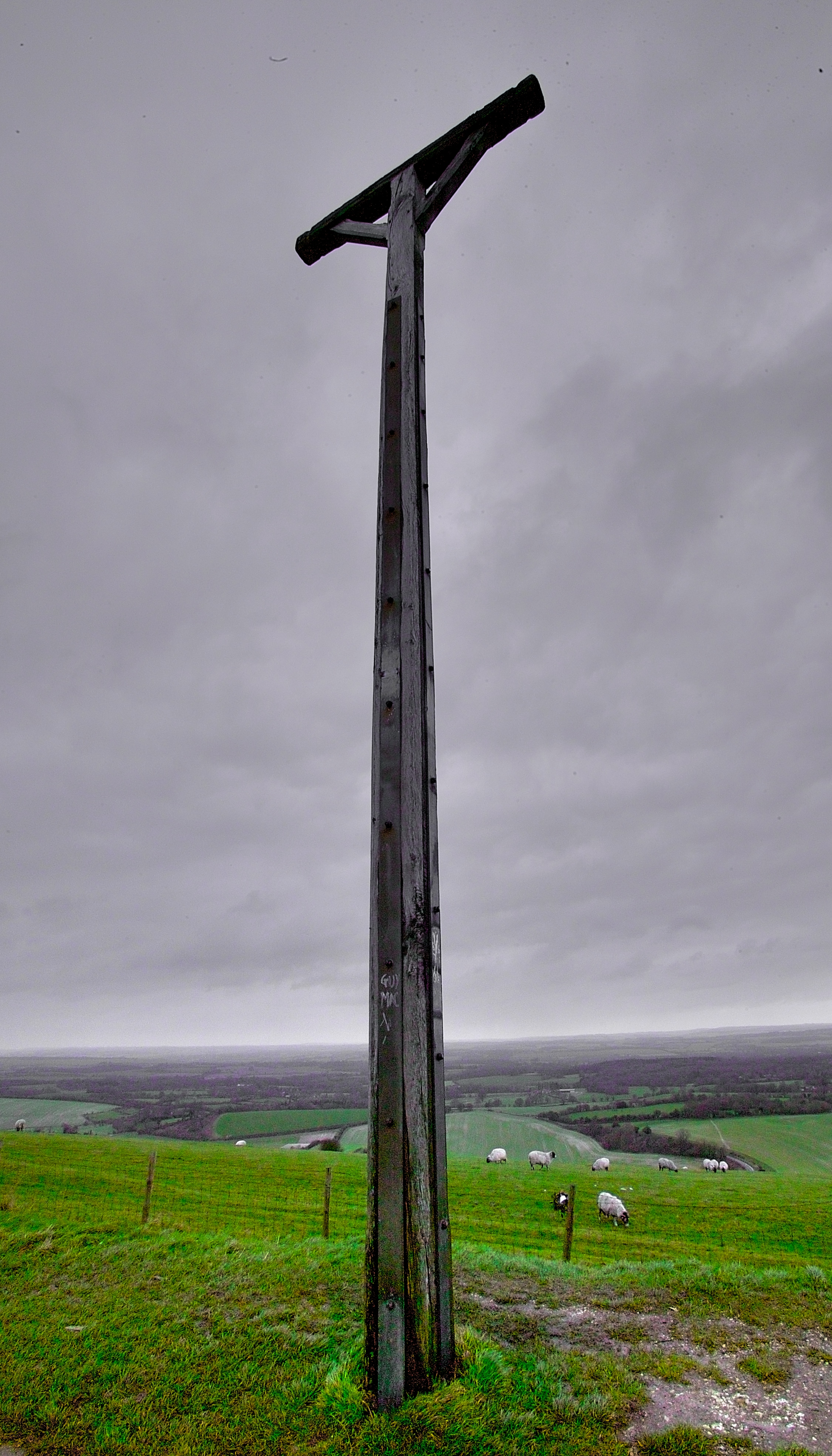
Combe Gibbet, a replica gibbet in Berkshire

The Murder Act 1751 (25 Geo. 2. c. 37) stipulated that "in no case whatsoever shall the body of any murderer be suffered to be buried"; the cadaver was either to be publicly dissected or left "hanging in chains". The use of gibbeting had been in decline for some years before it was formally abolished by the Hanging in Chains Act 1834 (4 & 5 Will. 4. c. 26). In Scotland, the final case of gibbeting was that of Alexander Gillan in 1810. The last two men gibbeted in England were the miner William Jobling and the bookbinder James Cook, both in 1832. Their cases are good examples of the changing attitudes toward the practice.

William Jobling was a miner hanged and gibbeted for the murder of Nicholas Fairles, a colliery owner and local magistrate, near Jarrow, Durham. After being hanged, the body was taken off the rope and loaded into a cart and taken on a tour of the area before arriving at Jarrow Slake, where the crime had been committed. Here, the body was placed into an iron gibbet cage. The cage and the scene were described thus:

The body was encased in flat bars of iron of two and a half inches in breadth, the feet were placed in stirrups, from which a bar of iron went up each side of the head, and ended in a ring by which he was suspended; a bar from the collar went down the breast, and another down the back, there were also bars in the inside of the legs which communicated with the above; and crossbars at the ankles, the knees, the thighs, the bowels the breast and the shoulders; the hands were hung by the side and covered with pitch, the face was pitched and covered with a piece of white cloth.

Jobling's gibbet was a one-foot (30 cm) in diameter with strong bars of iron up each side. The post was fixed into a one-and-a-half-long-ton (1,500 kg) stone base sunk into the Slake. The body was soon removed by fellow miners and given a decent burial.

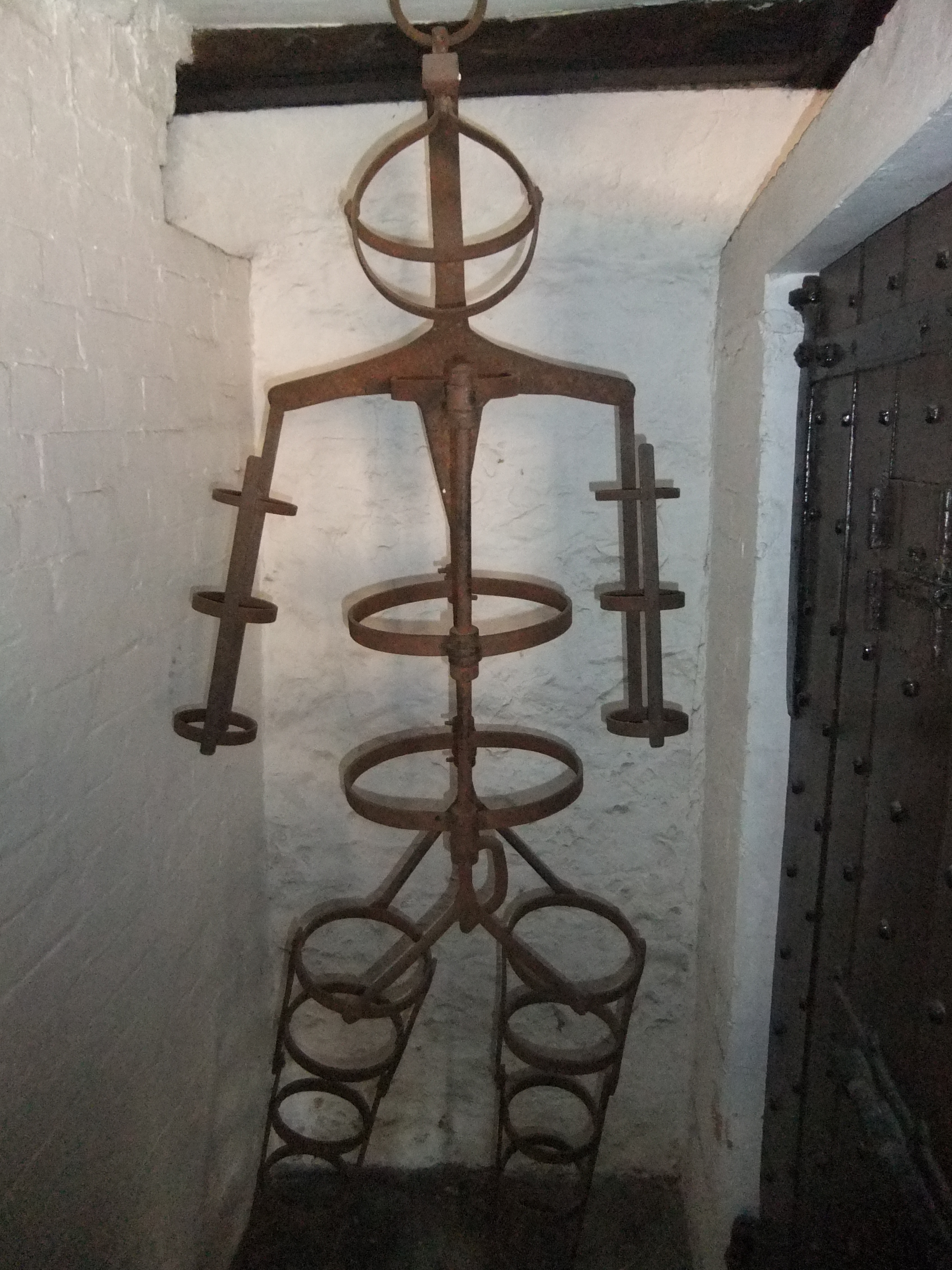
The gibbet cage used to gibbet James Cook, a bookbinder and the last man to be gibbeted in the United Kingdom, in 1832

James Cook was a bookbinder convicted of the murder of his creditor Paas, a manufacturer of brass instruments, in Leicester. During an attempted robbery, Cook beat Paas to death, and then took the body to his home, where he cut it into pieces and burned it to try to hide the evidence of the crime. He was executed on Friday, 10 August 1832, in front of Leicester prison. Afterwards:

The head was shaved and tarred, to preserve it from the action of the weather; and the cap in which he had suffered was drawn over his face. On Saturday afternoon his body, attired as at the time of his execution, having been firmly fixed in the irons necessary to keep the limbs together, was carried to the place of its intended suspension.

His body was to be displayed on a purpose-built gallows 33 feet (10 m) high in Saffron Lane near the Aylestone Tollgate. According to The Newgate Calendar:

Thousands of persons were attracted to the spot, to view this novel but most barbarous exhibition; and considerable annoyance was felt by persons resident in the neighbourhood of the dreadful scene. Representations were in consequence made to the authorities, and on the following Tuesday morning instructions were received from the Home Office directing the removal of the gibbet.

Although the practice of gibbeting had been abandoned by 1834 in Britain, during the British Raj of India in 1843, Charles James Napier threatened to have such structures built in parallel to any attempt to practice sati, the ritualized burning of widows, to execute the perpetrators.

== In popular culture ==
"Le Gibet"
by Maurice Ravel

Works of art depicting gibbeting include:

- Known as "Le Gibet", the second movement of composer Maurice Ravel's piano suite Gaspard de la nuit is based on the poems of Aloysius Bertrand.
- Daphne du Maurier's 1951 Gothic novel My Cousin Rachel opens with the protagonist's memory of a corpse in a gibbet.
- The 2006 film Pirates of the Caribbean: Dead Man's Chest features a prisoner in a gibbet in one of the opening scenes, where he is graphically pecked to death by crows.
- In the Orson Welles film Othello, Iago's fate is to be gibbeted.
- In the 1988 fantasy classic Willow, Val Kilmer's character Madmartigan is suspended in a gibbet at the beginning of the film.
- Crow cages and other forms of gibbeting are shown in the 1982 film Conan the Barbarian.
- Sweeney Todd the Barber, sung by Stanley Holloway in his album, 'Ere's 'Olloway, refers to Sweeney Todd's demise: "And there on the gibbet/He hangs in his chains..."
- In the extended edition of Peter Jackson’s 2003 film The Lord of the Rings: The Return of the King, King Theoden tells Saruman the White that, for there to be peace, Saruman must hang from a gibbet "for the sport of your own crows", to which Saruman replies "Gibbets and Crows? Dotard!"
- In the 1991 film Robin Hood: Prince of Thieves, Robin Hood and his companion Azeem discover the rotted corpse of Hood's father, Lord Locksley, in a gibbet, the work of the Sheriff of Nottingham and his gang.
- The A Song of Ice and Fire books feature hanging cage gibbetting, among other historical torture methods.
- "Gibbet Hill" is an 1890 short story by Bram Stoker

== See also ==
- Dule tree
- Pillory
- Gibbet of Montfaucon
