= Murder of Nicholas Fairles =

1832 murder and gibbeting

The murder of Nicholas Fairles took place on 11 June 1832 outside a public house in Durham, England. Fairles, a Magistrate of the county of Durham, was approached by William Jobling who asked him for money and a drink; as Fairles refused, another man who Fairles later identified as Ralph Armstrong attacked Fairles from behind, beating him with stones and Fairles' own horn stick. Witnesses stated that Jobling held Fairles down as Armstrong did so. Fairles died from his injuries 10 days later.

While Armstrong escaped and was never caught, Jobling was apprehended and was sentenced to execution by hanging as well as hanging in chains under the Murder Act 1751 at the Durham Assizes on 1 August 1832. He was executed on 3 August, and then gibbeted at Jarrow Slake, becoming the penultimate person to be gibbeted in Britain before the practice was outlawed, James Cook being the last. On 7 September his body was removed unauthorised and has not been found since, probably having been buried. Though Jobling's gibbet appears to be in the collection of South Shields Museum, it is unclear how much of this is a replica, and it is possible that Jobling was buried inside the original cage. Jobling's legacy as a martyr has appeared in culture, music, and political writing.

== Background ==
The murder took place following the 1831 Great Strike, which had ended in victory for the miners and improvements in their yearly contracts, as well as resentment of the trade unions formed during the conflict by mine owners by 1832. That year, mine owners began refusing to 'bind' (give a yearly contract to) any man who was a member of these unions. New strikes started in March 1832, and by spring over 8,000 pitmen were on strike, with nearly the same number having returned to work to support those striking. At the same time, a major cholera epidemic and the parliamentary reform campaign of 1831–1832 were also taking place, causing an acute state of crisis.

William Jobling, a coal miner, probably began working in the mines before age 10. He married Isabella Jobling (née Turner), and had several young children at the time of the murder in 1832, being 30 years of age. He had been unemployed since 5 April that year and had additionally run out of money. Nicholas Fairles, Esq. was a Magistrate of the county of Durham who had taken up temporary residence at the Jarrow Colliery so he could prevent further breaches of the peace. He was seemingly a respected elder community member who was involved in upholding the law, once ordering the seizure of 500 cakes and rolls after finding them to be deficient in weight and giving them to the poor. On another occasion he had prevented a medical man from obtaining corpses from the Constable and the churchyard. Fairles and Jobling were known to each other.

== Murder ==
On 11 June 1832, Jobling was lingering by the road and asking passers-by to "treat him with a quart of ale". One John Arthur Foster of the Jarrow colliery gave him a shilling, meaning he had some success with this. Fairles was returning to town on a pony.

At about 5 o'clock, Fairles rode by Turner's public house, just past a turnpike on the road from Jarrow Colliery. Jobling approached him, placed a hand on Fairles's, and asked for money and a drink. Fairles said that Jobling already had "a sufficiency", and so refused. At this point, another man came up behind Fairles, grabbed his coat, and dragged him from his horse. Eyewitnesses saw two men setting upon Fairles, and all three struggling on the ground; it was said that "one of the men rested on Mr. Fairles, and struck him with a large stick, and the other held him down. One Mary Taylor and her aunt Margaret Hall stated that they heard one of the men say "kill him, kill him". Taylor shouted at the men and they ran away. Fairles was led away, injured and bleeding, to a nearby house by the women. Witnesses saw both men had been running along the road to South Shields, Armstrong having blood on his hands.

Fairles lived for ten more days, during this time giving a statement on the attack and naming Jobling as the man who had held him down as the man he named as Ralph Armstrong, a pitman of the Jarrow Colliery, attacked him with stones and Fairles' own horn stick. Jobling was located and brought in, though Armstrong disappeared after the attack, being still at large during Jobling's trial. Hundreds of pounds were offered for his apprehension; he was said to be "about 44 Years of Age, 5 feet 9 inches high, stout made, Dark Complexion, Blue Eyes, large Mouth, large turned-up Nose and Brown Hair," though he was never caught.

== Trial, execution and gibbeting of William Jobling ==
The Durham Assizes took place on 1 August 1832. Jobling could not afford a lawyer. Jobling's indictment charged that he assisted Armstrong in murdering Fairles, to which he pleaded not guilty and continued to do so. When Fairles' stick was produced with blood visible on the end, it was reported that "Jobling changed colour". He argued that he had run away when Armstrong pulled Fairles off his horse. The judge, Mr Justice Parke, attributed what he said was Jobling's "want of moral principle" to the unions that had been involved in the region's labour disputes, calling them "injurious to the public interest and to those who are concerned in them". Jobling was found guilty and sentenced to death by hanging on the basis that he failed to decisively act to prevent the murder. Parke further directed that his corpse be hung in chains, believing that this was the only option available under the Murder Act 1751; he was of the belief that royal assent had likely already been given to a bill that would discontinue dissection as an alternate punishment for convicted murderers.

Jobling's execution date was 3 August 1832. He was hanged by executioner William Curry outside Durham Gaol. As he was about to be launched, it was reported that "a person near the scaffold cried out, 'Farewell, Jobling', and he instantly turned his head in the direction whence the sound proceeded, which displaced the cord, and consequently protracted his sufferings, which continued some minutes."

Jobling was then gibbeted; his gibbet resided on Jarrow slake, a tidal mud flat in the Tyne estuary, within sight of Jobling's wife's cottage. It was guarded by soldiers. On 11 August, the Leicester Chronicle; or, Commercial and Agricultural Advertiser wrote that "it is supposed, however, that [Jobling's] fellow workmen will very soon remove [his body] and bury it in some private place … In the act of parliament ordering murderers' bodies of [sic] to be hung in chains, there is a clause inflicting the punishment of transportation for seven years upon all who may be guilty of stealing the body from the gibbet". The gibbetings of Jobling, as well as that of James Cook a week later, aroused signigficant media interest as well as outcry from the educated classes.

== Removal of the gibbet ==
Once the soldiers withdrew after around a month, Jobling's remains were removed on the night of 7 September 1832 without authorisation. This was possibly the work of Jobling's fellow pitmen, or his friends and family, acting in "service to his memory" despite the possible 7-year transportation penalty. Nobody was tried for the removal of the body, and his body has never been found, though it was probably buried. Newspaper accounts state that the gibbet post remained at Jarrow slake until March 1856, when it removed by contractors during construction of the Tyne Docks.

=== Whereabouts of Jobling's body and gibbet cage ===
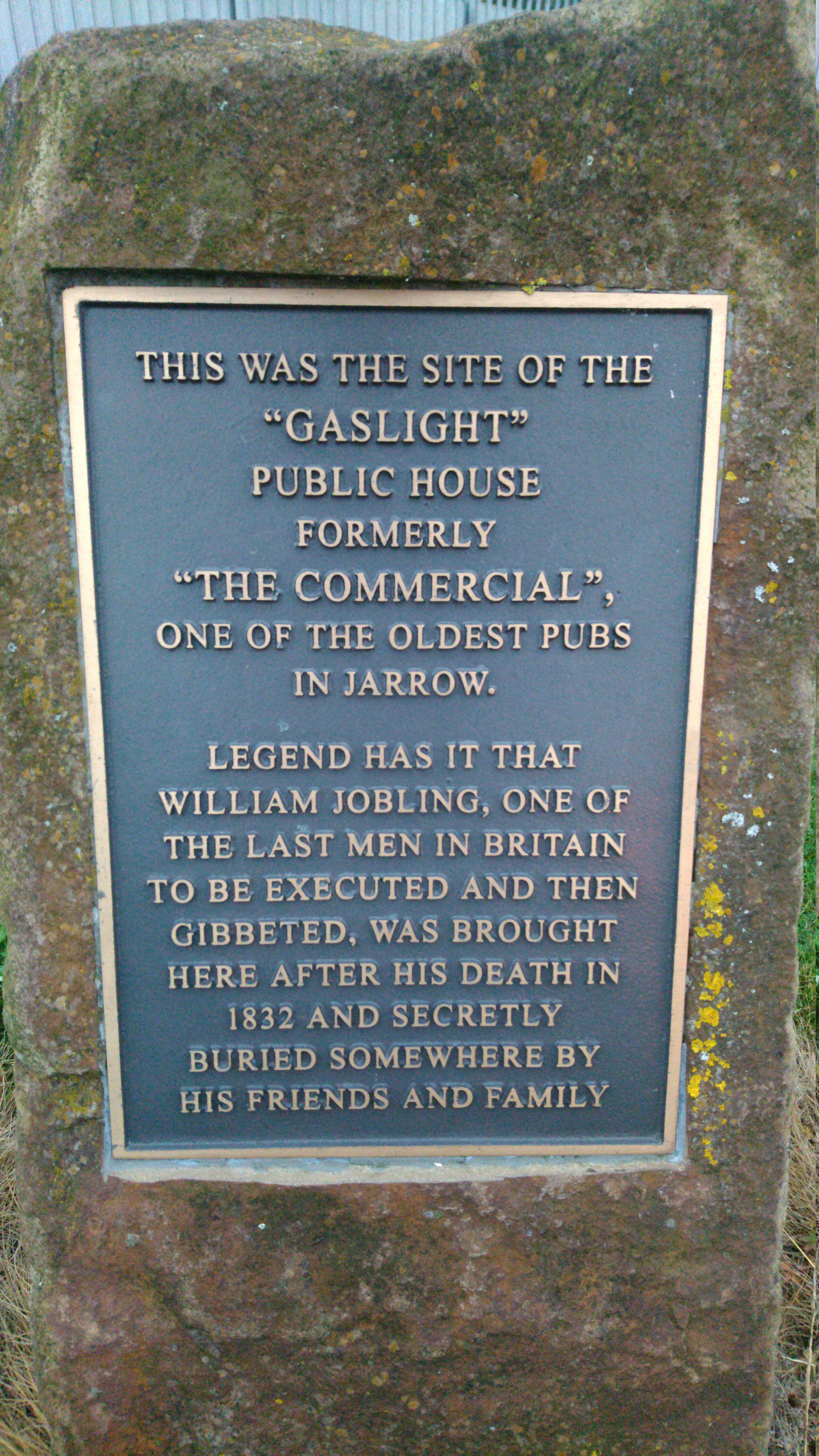
A stone memorial to William Jobling, costing £3,000 and unveiled in 2012 by Mayor of South Tyneside Coun Eileen Leask, resides on the former site of the Gaslight public house. It rumours that he was buried there, though his body has not been found.

A story which appears in the Proceedings of the Newcastle Society of Antiquaries in 1888, as well as G. Hodgson's work in 1903, states that the gibbet was cut down by sawing through its iron bar which attached it to the crosspiece, though that it was nearly morning by the time this task was completed, and that Jobling's body had to be temporarily buried in the slake before being removed and reburied the following night in a grave in the corner of Jarrow Quay. It is unclear whether Jobling was buried in his gibbet cage. This story comes from an alleged deathbed confession by Jobling's brother-in-law Robert Turner. A letter sent to the Newcastle Society of Antiquaries from Richard Fairlamb of Greatham Hospital, near West Hartlepool, stated that a man Fairlamb had worked with 50 years earlier told him that he was one of the people who buried Jobling's body, stating that he was "enclosed in the cage, in the south-west corner of Jarrow churchyard."

However, the society also records an 1888 donation from the North Eastern Railway Company consisting of "the ironwork of Jobling’s gibbet from Jarrow Slake." It is unclear how much of the gibbet was part of this donation. This was then loaned in a well-documented manner to the museum at Jarrow, and then to South Shields Museum. In the early 1970s, a mine detector was used to attempt to locate the cage, though this was not successful, and neither were attempts to do so by local historian Vincent Rea. In 2014, the donated gibbet was on display, though it is not clear from the museum's records how much of the gibbet is a replica. It is clear, however, that the ornamented pulley-operated chain and the gibbet post are likely original, the post being a rare example of a surviving upper section of a gibbet post. It has been identified as the same gibbet that was on display in the 1970s.

== Legacy ==
The practice of hanging in chains was formally abolished two years after Jobling's death, in 1834. This act was largely prompted by the problems the English authorities faced when gibbeting the bodies of Jobling and Cook. The act made Jobling the penultimate person to be gibbeted in Britain.

In 1872, J. H. B wrote in the journal Notes and Queries that he "remember[ed] the post of [Jobling's] gibbet standing within the last twenty years". He also stated that his friend, "son to a late governor at a county gaol", was present as a child when Jobling was measured while alive for his post-mortem gibbeting in Tyneside; he used this to falsely argue that Jobling had been hung in chains while alive.

The Town That Was Murdered (1939), the work of Labour MP for Jarrow Ellen Wilkinson, tells the story of the murder of Fairles and Jobling's death sentence, describing the gibbeting as "revived medieval horror". She wrote that "Jobling was regarded as a martyr by the miners who knew him, and the memory of this revenge-execution still lingers in Jarrow."

=== In culture ===
A myth of Jobling as a martyr formed. Songs, stories, poems and memorials have been written in tribute to Jobling, portraying him as a man punished by the powerful as a deterrent to labour organising in the nineteenth century.

In 1972, an exhibition about Jobling and his post-mortem punishment was shown at the Bede Gallery, including artistic representations and a life-sized replica of Jobling's gibbet, commissioned from artist Laurie Wheatley. The song "Farewell Jobling" was released by the folk band The Whiskey Priests. The Jarrow Brewery have since made a beer named Jobling's Swinging Gibbet. Jobling's gibbet cage resides in South Shields Museum, though this is possibly a replica.
