= Gibbeting of James Cook =

1832 post-execution display of English murderer

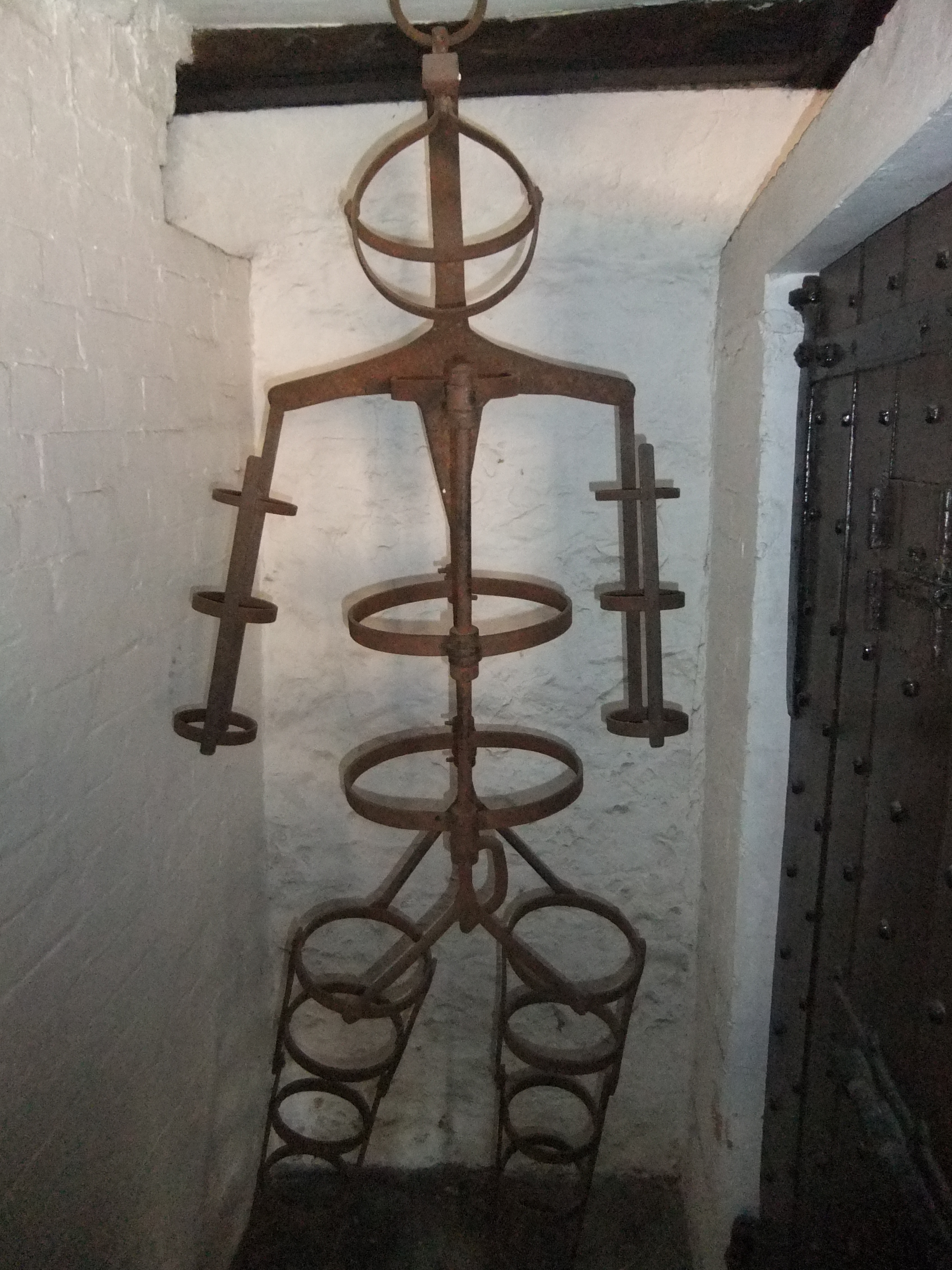
Replica of Cook's iron gibbet cage at Leicester Guildhall

The gibbeting of James Cook took place on 11 August 1832 on the edge of Leicester, on the Saffron Lane-Aylestone Road junction near the Aylestone tollgate. Cook was a 21-year-old bookbinder who was convicted of murdering John Paas, a brass instrument manufacturer to whom Cook owed money. Cook was convicted of the murder on 8 August, hanged on 10 August and gibbeted (also known as hanging in chains) the next day. The execution saw around 40,000 onlookers and the gibbeting was watched by over 20,000. The gibbeting was derided in the press.

Cook's body was taken down four days later by executive order from the Home Secretary, also issued on 11 August. He was then buried in the gibbet cage on the same spot. The outlawing of the practice of gibbeting in 1834 made Cook the last man to be gibbeted in England. In the 20th century the gibbet was dug up, eventually making its way to the Nottingham Galleries of Justice.

== Murder and trial ==
Cook was a 21-year-old bookbinder. He was convicted of the murder of John Paas, a brass instrument manufacturer to whom he owed money; this crime was discovered when neighbours of Paas saw light and smoke coming from Paas's house, finding that Cook was attempting to burn Paas's dismembered body so as to destroy evidence of the crime.

Cook was convicted of the murder and sentenced to death on 8 August 1832. The Anatomy Act 1832 had been in the final stages of approval when Cook's trial judge, James Alan Park, had left London, and as such Park was probably confident that he could no longer allow Cook to be dissected. He was likely also aware that this Act also sanctioned burial within the prison as an alternative to hanging in chains, though described himself as "a High Tory in church and state," and as such probably chose the option most opposed to reform.

== Execution and gibbeting ==
Cook was executed outside Leicester gaol on 10 August. Crowds at the execution numbered about 40,000. Cook's body was cut down after execution and placed in the gaol to make it available for public viewing and for the rubbing of wens (an attempted cure for sebaceous cysts on the scalp or face through the rubbing of the hand of corpses on these cysts).

Cook was gibbeted on the junction of Saffron Lane and Aylestone Road on the edge of Leicester, near the Aylestone tollgate, on 11 August, a week after the gibbeting of William Jobling. The site was "on a piece of waste ground," chosen to be "so secluded as not to be discernable" by anyone until they were "within a few yards of it". Newspaper accounts state that Cook's body was dipped in tar, and then redressed in the clothes in which he had been executed. The gibbet was then placed on a pole about 33 feet (10 m) high.

The cage is made from iron, and features rigid, hinged hoops. Straight bars run down the front and rear of its torso section as well as along the limbs, with separate spaces existing for each arm and leg. Rigid, hinged semi-circle hoops form a girdle around the body and contain the limbs, and the legs end with footplates. Its headpiece includes a thick, curved strap, ascending the back of Cook's head to form a hook at the top. Another hoop is attached to this, passing under Cook's chin, and another horizontal strap passes across the back of the head.

Much of the crowd had followed Cook's body after his execution, and as such crowds of more than 20,000 people attended Cook's gibbeting. These crowds were described as behaving "as if they were at a wake or a fair, rather than on a spot where a human being was hung up as a warning to others." Public fascination with the gibbet did not decline for three days after this. Cook's gibbeting, as well as that of William Jobling the week prior, caused considerable media interest and a general outcry from the educated classes. The press was highly critical; the Morning Herald commented a few days after the gibbeting that "The revival of the odious practice of gibbeting which had been banished by the progress of civilized habits was a great disgrace to the legislature of England in the nineteenth century."

== Burying of the gibbet ==
The revocation of Cook's body being hung in chains was ordered through an executive order from the Home Secretary, signed on 11 August, the same day Cook was gibbeted. This order was not issued for the gibbet holding Jobling's body in Durham; one newspaper from Durham criticised this, asking "Was his case so much worse, or is gibbeting supposed to be more effective in Durham than it is in Leicester?"

When authorities at Leicester received the order, Cook's gibbet was removed four days after he was first suspended. The gibbet was then buried at the place where it had stood, with his body still inside.

The decision to remove the gibbet was praised in the press. Newspaper commentary suggests that the removal was motivated by the very large crowds, a possibility for disorder, and a general distaste for the exhibition of cadavers. The crowds also caused disruption to travel and trade of Leicester. A journalist for the Leicester and Nottingham Journal's 18 August 1832 issue wrote of this dismantling:

We are glad that the disgusting sight has been removed considering it, as we do, the revival of a barbarous custom which a more humanized age has long exploded from the statute book. That the application should have been made in the case of one of the most brutal murders ever committed, is singular; but it will be attended with one important effect. James Cook will be the last murderer that will be sentenced to be hung in chains, since no Judge can hereafter think of awarding the punishment to ordinary murderers while the most atrocious delinquent of that description has been ungibbeted by an order bearing the King’s sign manual.

Another passage from the same journal reads as such:

We have heard several reasons given for the interment of Cook’s body, but as the Secretary of State’s letter has not been published, we can give no positive information on the subject. One cause that we have heard assigned is, that should murders be as frequent within the next twelve years as they have been during the same time gone by, the county would be frightfully studded with such exhibitions, and there being now little waste land except by the side of roads, they must necessarily prove a great annoyance to the inhabitants residing in the villages. However, be the cause what it may, we are glad that the disgusting sight has been removed considering it, as we do, the revival of a barbarous custom which a more humanized age has long exploded from the statute book.

The Royal Cornwall Gazette wrote that "Even this tardy repeal is creditable to the feeling of the King".

The practice of gibbeting was outlawed in 1834, making Cook the last man to be gibbeted in England.

== Museum display of gibbet ==
In the 20th century, Cook's gibbet was dug up by workmen carrying out improvements to the junction. The cage was then donated to the H. M. Prison Service museum, and later passed to the Nottingham Galleries of Justice, where it remained as of 2017. A replica exists at Leicester Guildhall.
