= Baron Darcy de Darcy =

Extinct barony in the Peerage of England

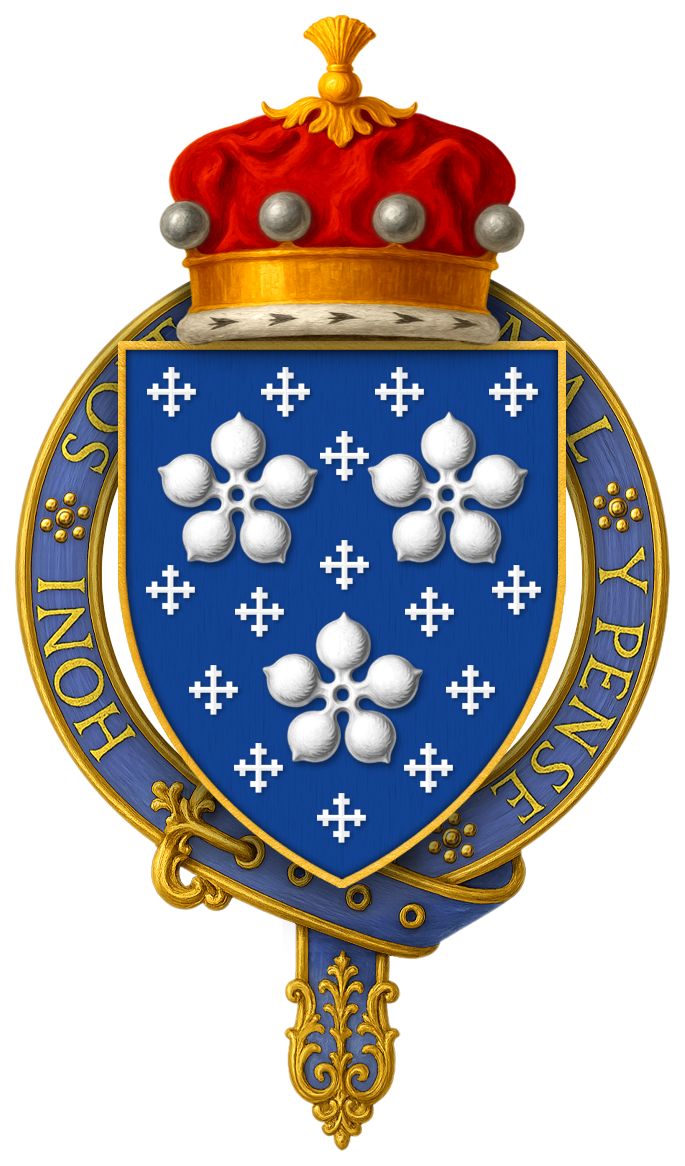
Coat of arms of Sir Thomas Darcy, first Baron Darcy de Darcy

Baron Darcy de Darcy, also known as Baron Darcy of Temple Hurst, was a title which was created twice in the Peerage of England. On 17 October 1509 Thomas Darcy was summoned to parliament, and the same year Lord Darcy was invested as a Knight of the Garter, but in 1538, he was attainted and his barony forfeited. In 1548, a fresh creation of the peerage was made for his son George. On the death of the third baron of the second creation in 1635, the barony became extinct.

== Barons Darcy de Darcy (1509) ==
- Thomas Darcy, 1st Baron Darcy de Darcy (died 1537) (attainted and forfeited 1538)

== Barons Darcy de Darcy (1548) ==
- George Darcy, 1st Baron Darcy de Darcy (died 1557)
- John Darcy, 2nd Baron Darcy de Darcy (1529-1587)
- John Darcy, 3rd Baron Darcy de Darcy (died 1635)
