= George Ashby (martyr) =

George Ashby (name uncertain) (died 1537) was an English Cistercian monk of Jervaulx Abbey.

A monk of this name, or Astleby (perhaps a surname taken from a location) is mentioned in various English martyrologies, as a victim of government reprisals after the Pilgrimage of Grace.
