= Francis Bigod =

British noble (1507–1537)

Sir Francis Bigod (4 October 1507 – 2 June 1537; also spelled Bigot, Bygod, Bygott, Bygate) was an English nobleman who was the leader of Bigod's rebellion.

== Family ==
Francis Bigod was descended from the Bigod Earls of Norfolk and from the Barons Mauley of Mulgrave Castle near Whitby, Yorkshire. Born 4 October 1507 at Seaton Manor in Hinderwell, Yorkshire, Francis was the eldest son of Sir John Bigod and Joan Strangways, the daughter of Sir James Strangways. His father was killed by the Scots in 1513, perhaps at the Battle of Flodden. His paternal grandfather, Sir Ralph Bigod, died two years later in 1515, leaving Francis, then seven years of age, as his heir. After the death of Francis' father, his mother, Joan, married Sir William Maleverer.

== Career ==
On 9 May 1515, Francis' wardship was granted to Cardinal Thomas Wolsey, and he may have grown up in Wolsey's household. He attended Oxford, but left without taking a degree, though his letters show that he was a scholar.

In 1527, he was in Wolsey's service. He proved his age on 23 September 1529, and was soon afterwards knighted. According to Hicks, it was likely Wolsey who chose Katherine Conyers (d. 1566), the daughter of William Conyers, 1st Baron Conyers, as Francis' wife, and it was likely Wolsey to whom her marriage portion was paid.

In his youth he became "a committed Protestant with scholarly theological interests", hearing several sermons daily and corresponding with reformers, including Thomas Garret. At one point he considered taking orders. Under Thomas Cromwell, Wolsey's successor, he was engaged in advancing in Yorkshire Henry VIII's ecclesiastical reforms.

Unlike Cromwell, however, he wished the monasteries to be reformed, not dissolved, and in some cases personally undertook their reformation. He assisted in the compilation of the Valor Ecclesiasticus. In 1533–36, in a Treatise Concernyng Impropriations of Benefices, he argued that tithes should be transferred from the monasteries to the support of preachers. He served as a Justice of the Peace from 1532 on, and was a Member of Parliament in 1529 and 1536, although his constituency is unknown.

According to Hicks, Bigod initially opposed the 1535 Catholic uprising (the " Pilgrimage of Grace"), as an ardent Protestant. He fled by sea from Mulgrave Castle, but his ship was forced to land at Hartlepool, where he narrowly escaped lynching by the commons. He returned to Mulgrave, was captured, and, for a time, participated reluctantly in the rising.

At some point, however, Bigod came to realize that his own opposition to the King's erastian intervention in religion was shared by those participating in the Pilgrimage of Grace. Thus, when those involved in the Pilgrimage, under the leadership of Robert Aske, were pardoned and agreed to disperse on 8 December 1536, Bigod, fearing repression by the King, launched an uprising of his own on 16 January 1537, in concert with his tenant, John Hallam, a yeoman of Watton.

His efforts to promulgate his platform attracted little support, either from the aristocracy or the commons. His plan to have George Lumley (father of John Lumley, 1st Baron Lumley) seize Scarborough Castle and Hallam Hall on 16 January failed utterly, and his own assault on Kingston upon Hull on 19 January was forestalled by the capture of almost his entire force in a dawn raid at Beverley, Yorkshire. He escaped to Mulgrave, and from thence to Cumberland, where he was captured on 10 February, and sent to Carlisle Castle. He was hanged for treason at Tyburn on 2 June 1537, and buried at the Greyfriars in London.

According to Hicks, Bigod's uprising "enabled Henry VIII to wreak revenge on those implicated in the 1536 revolt, very few of whom rose in 1537".

By his wife Katharine he left a son, Ralph, who was restored in blood by Act of Parliament in 1549/50, but died without issue, and a daughter, Dorothy, his eventual heir, through whom the estates came, through her marriage, into the hands of the Radcliffe family.

Rastell (the chronicler) in a letter to Cromwell, 17 Aug [1534] (Cal. Of State Papers Hen. VIII, vol. viii. No. 1070), calls Bigod wise and well learned; and Bale describes him as homo naturalium splendore nobilis ac doctus et evangelicæ veritatis amator ('a man of natural splendor, noble and educated and a lover of evangelical truth').

His letters to Cromwell, many of which are preserved in the Public Record Office, show him to have been deeply in debt. He wrote a treatise on 'Impropriations', against the impropriation of parsonages by the monasteries (London, by Tho. Godfray cum privilegio regali, small 8vo). It appears to have been written after the birth of Elizabeth and before Anne Boleyn's disgrace, i.e. between September 1533 and April 1536. Copies are in the British Museum and in Lambeth Palace Library, and the preface is reprinted at the end of Sir Henry Spelman's 'Larger work of Tithes' (1647 edition). Bigod also translated some Latin works, and, during the insurrection, wrote against the royal supremacy.

He owned two residences in Yorkshire, Settrington and Mulgrave Castle.

After Bigod's death in 1591, Queen Elizabeth I granted Edmund Sheffield, 3rd Baron Sheffield the Manor of Mulgrave in Yorkshire as part of his forfeited estate.
