= Adam Sedbar, Abbot of Jervaulx =

16th-century English Abbot

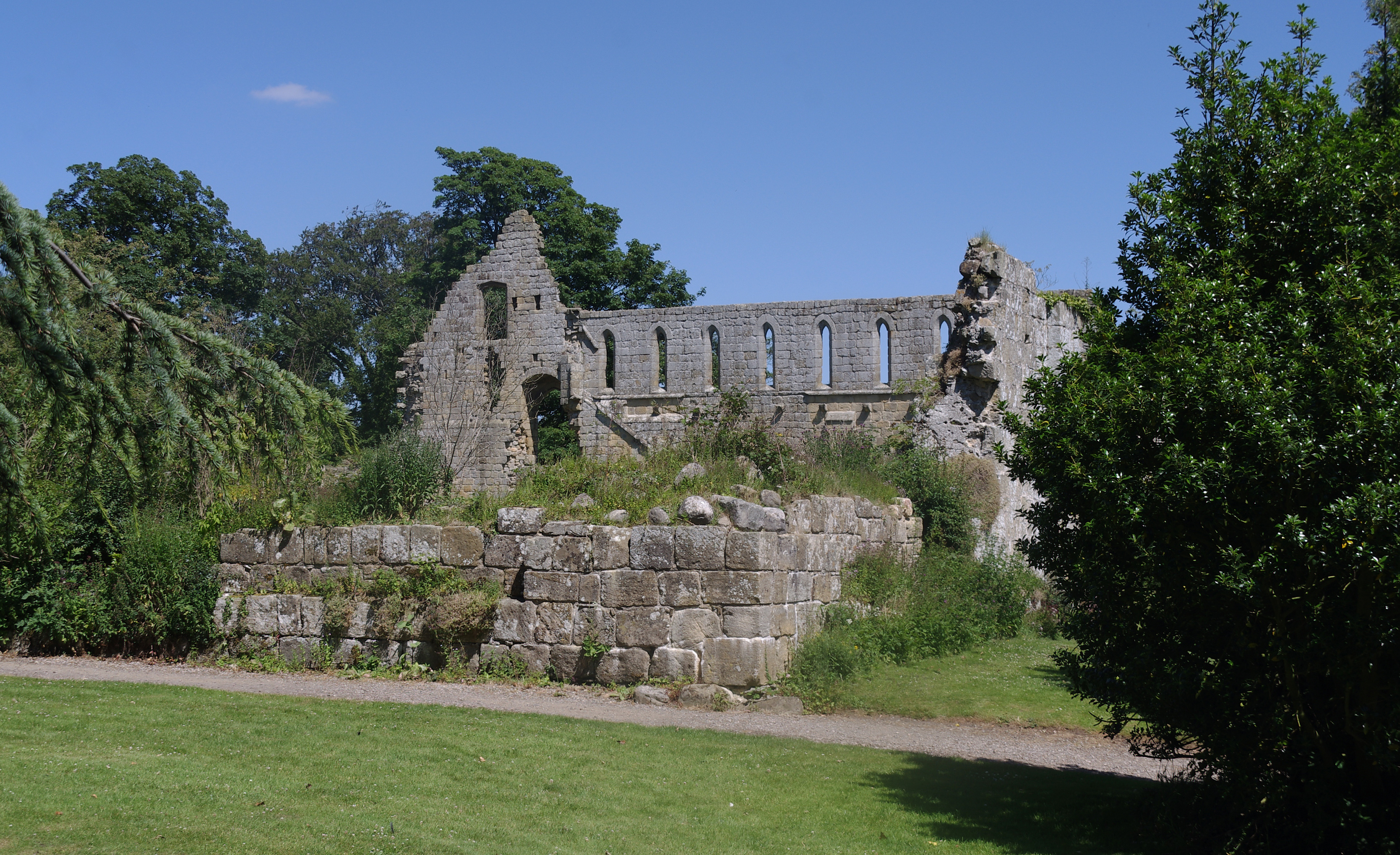
Jervaulx Abbey ruins

Adam Sedbar or Sedbergh (c. 1502 – 1537) was the 23rd and last Abbot of Jervaulx Abbey in Wensleydale, Yorkshire.

== Biography ==
Adam Sedbar had been elected abbot of the Cistercian abbey of Jervaulx in 1533 when Henry VIII introduced his plans for the Dissolution of the Monasteries. He was persuaded in 1536, somewhat reluctantly, to join in a Pilgrimage of Grace, together with other local abbots from Fountains, Bridlington and Guisborough Abbeys, in order to protest about the king's policies. The cause attracted a large number of followers, and urged on by a few fanatics, became increasingly militant. After a number of Yorkshire towns were attacked by the insurgents the King eventually decided, after some negotiation with their spokesman, to round up the ringleaders and charge them with treason. Sedbar sought sanctuary with John Scrope, 8th Baron Scrope of Bolton at his stronghold in Bolton Castle. When the King's Commissioners followed him there, Lord Scrope fled for his own safety and Sedbar hid out for several days on Witton Fell but was captured on 12 May 1537 and taken with others to be tried in London.

He was imprisoned in the Beauchamp tower in the Tower of London, where his inscribed name on the wall "ADAM SEDBAR. ABBAS JOREVALL 1537" can still be clearly seen. He was charged that "he did conspire to deprive the King of his title of Supreme Head of the English Church, and to compel him to hold a certain Parliament and convocation of the clergy of the realm, and did commit divers insurrections..." and "tried" or examined on both 25 April and 24 May. Although he claimed that the objectives of the insurrection were non-ecclesiastical he was found guilty, as were the other abbots, several monks and various lay ringleaders. He was taken with others on 2 June 1537 to Tyburn where they were hanged, drawn and quartered. The Prior of Bridlington suffered the same fate on the same day, as had the Abbot of Fountains and Prior of Guisborough a few days earlier. Their heads were all displayed on London Bridge.
