= Willingham by Stow =

Village in Lincolnshire, England

Coordinates: 53.349258°N 0.686595°W

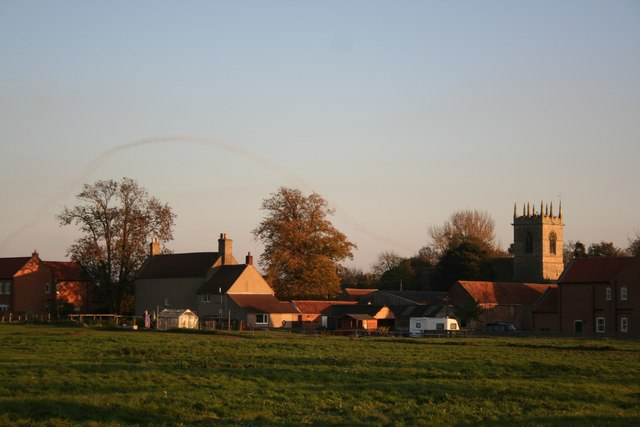
- Willingham by Stow village

- Location within Lincolnshire
- Population: 488 (2011)
- OS grid reference: SK875844
  - London: 130 mi (210 km) SSE
- District: West Lindsey
- Shire county: Lincolnshire
- Region: East Midlands
- Country: England
- Sovereign state: United Kingdom
- Post town: Gainsborough
- Postcode district: DN21
- Dialling code: 01427
- Police: Lincolnshire
- Fire: Lincolnshire
- Ambulance: East Midlands
- UK Parliament: Gainsborough

Willingham by Stow is a rural village in the West Lindsey district of Lincolnshire, England. The population of the civil parish (known as Willingham) at the 2011 census was 488. It is situated on the B1241, 6 miles (10 km) south-east from Gainsborough and 10 miles (16.1 km) north-west from Lincoln. To the north is Kexby, to the south is Stow and to the east is Fillingham.

The name "Willingham" means "homestead/village of the people of Willa".

== Community ==
Willingham village hall provides for organisations such as the parish council, Women's Institute and the Scouts, and for activities including drama, table tennis and yoga.

The parish church is dedicated to St Helen.

The nearest primary school is in Sturton by Stow. The village had a school from roughly 1818 until 1995.
