= Robert Aske (political leader) =

English lawyer and political leader (c. 1500 – 1537)

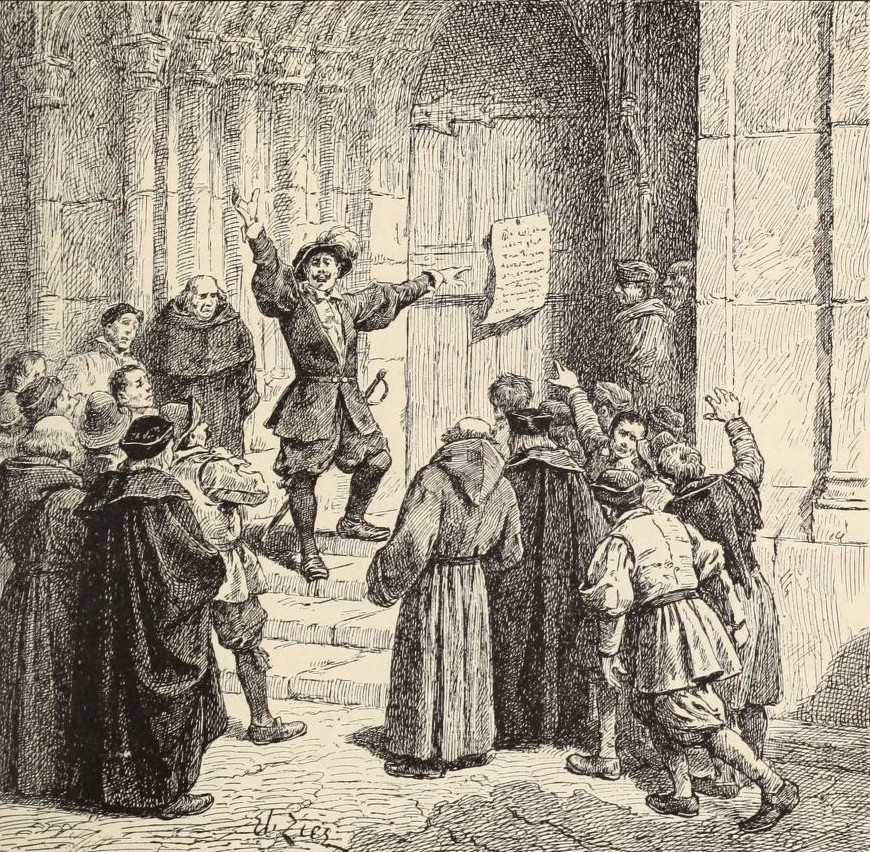
- Aske affixing his proclamation on the door of York Cathedral (illustration by É. Zier)
- Born: c. 1500
- Died: 12 July 1537 (aged 36–37); Clifford's Tower, York, Yorkshire, England
- Occupation: Lawyer

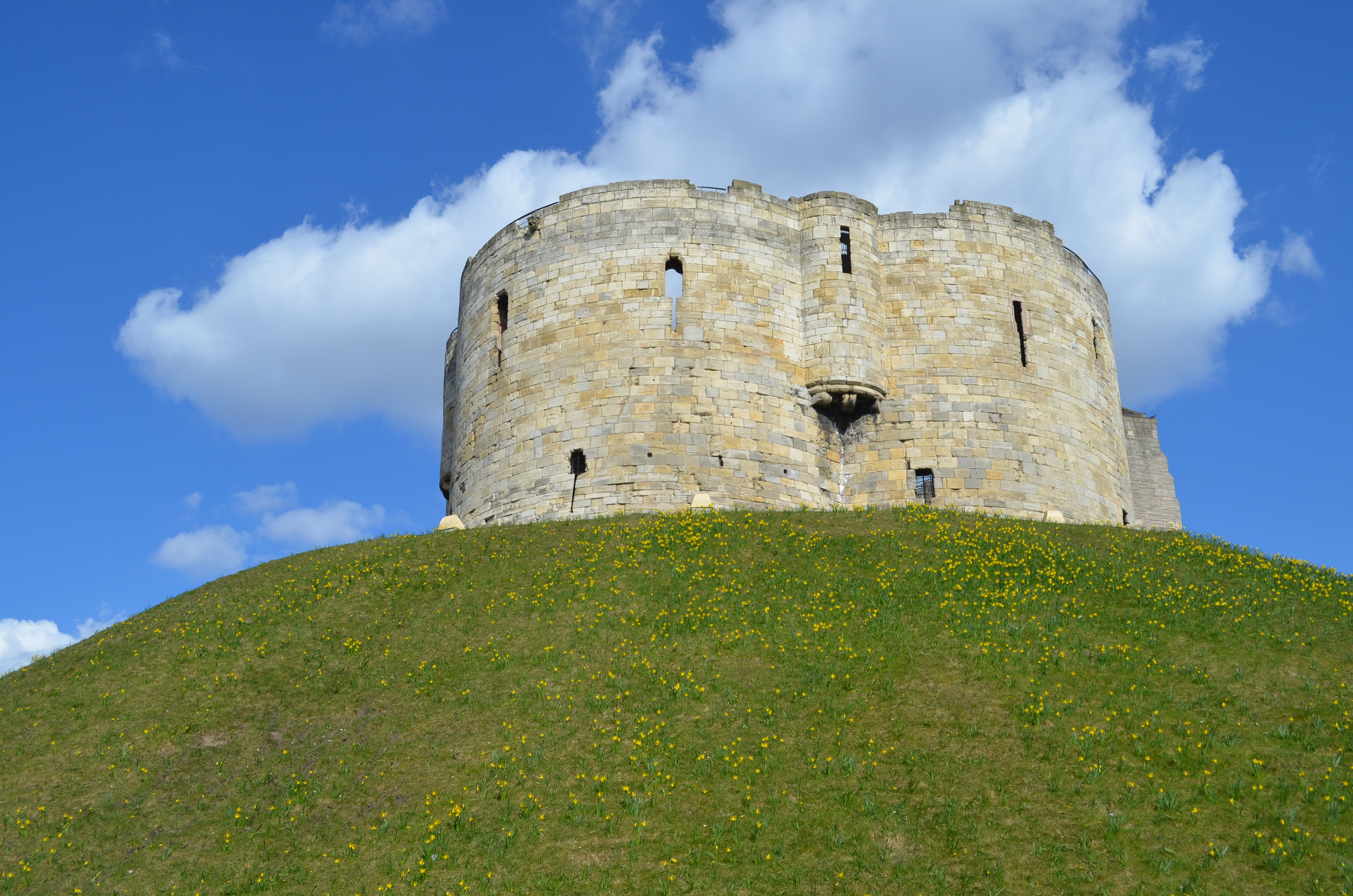
Clifford's Tower, the scene of Aske's execution in 1537

Robert Aske (c. 1500 – 12 July 1537) was an English lawyer who became a leader of the Pilgrimage of Grace uprising against the Suppression of Religious Houses Act 1535 in 1536. He was executed for treason against King Henry VIII on 12 July 1537.

== Life ==
Aske was a younger son of Sir Robert Aske of Aughton near Selby, of an old Yorkshire family. Aske was well connected: his mother, Elizabeth Clifford, was a daughter of John Clifford, 9th Baron de Clifford, and his wife Margaret Bromflete, only daughter of Sir Henry Bromflete; and Henry Clifford, 2nd Earl of Cumberland, was his first cousin once removed. Queen Jane Seymour was also his third cousin, also through his mother.

Aske became a barrister and was a Fellow of Gray's Inn. A devout Catholic, he objected to Henry's religious revolt, particularly the Dissolution of the Monasteries. When rebellion broke out in York against Henry VIII, Aske was returning to Yorkshire from London. Not initially involved in the rebellion, he took up the cause of the rebels and headed the Pilgrimage of Grace. By 10 October 1536, he had come to be regarded as their "chief captain". Most of Yorkshire, and parts of Northumberland, Durham, Cumberland, and Westmorland were in revolt.

Nine thousand insurgents marched on York, where Aske arranged for the expelled monks and nuns to return to their houses; the King's tenants were driven out and religious observance resumed.

On 13 November 1536, Aske treated with the royal delegates, including Thomas Howard, 3rd Duke of Norfolk, and received an assurance of an audience and safe passage to the King. Among the insurgents' requests was punishment of heretical bishops and of the King's evil advisers, recall of his anti-ecclesiastical legislation, prosecution of his "visitors", Lee and Layton, and a parliament in the North. He travelled to London, met Henry VIII, and received promises of redress and safe passage.

As he began his journey back north, fighting broke out again. This renewed fighting caused Henry to change his mind, and he had Aske arrested and brought to the Tower of London. Aske was convicted of high treason in the Palace of Westminster and was taken back to York, where he was executed on 12 July 1537, on a scaffold erected outside Clifford's Tower.

== Portrayals ==
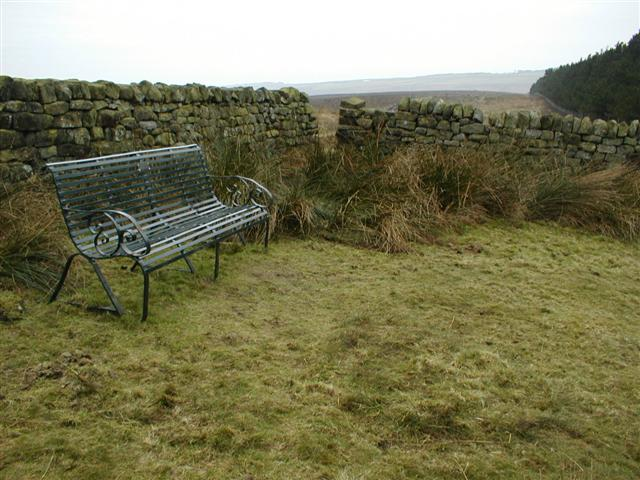
Robert Aske bench, Swainby

There are no known surviving portraits of Aske. All that is known of his physical appearance is that he was blind in one eye.

Aske was played by Sean Bean in the television serial Henry VIII (2003) in which he is inaccurately portrayed as a violent former lieutenant of Henry's army.

Aske was also portrayed by Gerard McSorley in the third season of Showtime's The Tudors. At the time of filming, McSorley was twenty years older than Aske was when he died. The series also shows Aske with a young family, while, in fact, he was not married.

The circumstances surrounding Aske's life feature prominently in C. J. Sansom's novel Sovereign and H. F. M. Prescott's novel The Man on a Donkey.

The events surrounding the Pilgrimage of Grace, its instigators and its outcomes form a significant episode in Hilary Mantel's novel The Mirror & the Light. The novel looks at the rebellion through the thoughts and actions of Thomas Cromwell in his capacity as a chief adviser to Henry VIII.

The actor Graham Turner portrayed Aske in David Starkey's 2009 documentary series Henry VIII: The Mind of a Tyrant.

Aske features in Philippa Gregory’s 2014 book “The King’s Curse”.

== See also ==
- All Saints Church, Aughton
