= William Fairall =

English outlaw

William Fairall (c.1722–1749) was an English outlaw, highwayman, smuggler and senior member of the Hawkhurst Gang, a notorious gang of smugglers based in Kent and Sussex.

He was baptised in Goudhurst on 3 March 1722, the son of Roger and Mary Fairall, but later orphaned.

Fairall was so notorious for his brutal courage "it was not considered safe to offend him". He became Thomas Kingsmill's second-in-command. In 1747, he was apprehended for smuggling in Sussex and sent for trial by James Butler Esq, but managed to escape. He later attempted to murder Butler and burn down his house in revenge. He was also involved in the murders of Galley and Chater. Fairall was present at the Goudhurst dispute and when the gang raided the Custom House, Poole in 1747.

On 26 April 1749, Fairall was hanged for housebreaking at Tyburn alongside Kingsmill. His body was sent to the High Sheriff of Kent to be gibbeted in Horsmonden.

The Highwayman, a pub in Horsmonden, was named for Fairall.
