= Thomas Kingsmill (Hawkhurst Gang) =

English outlaw

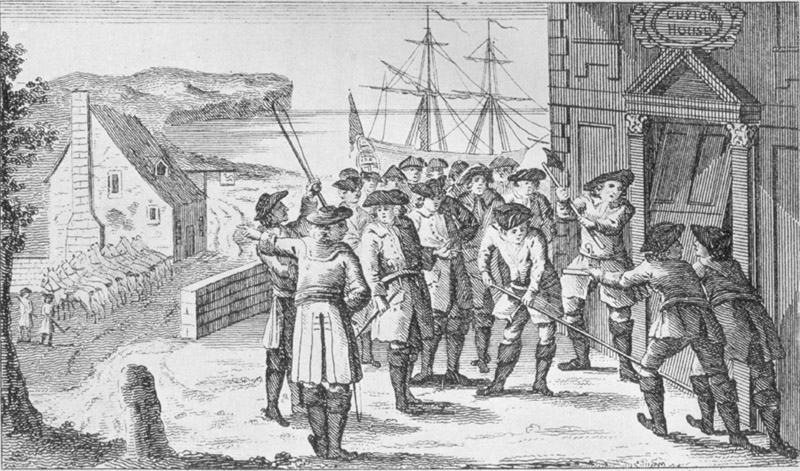
- Kingsmill leading the raid at the King's Custom House
- Born: 22 January 1720 (baptised); Goudhurst, Kent, England
- Died: 26 April 1749 (aged 29); Tyburn, Middlesex, England
- Cause of death: Execution by hanging
- Other name: Staymaker
- Occupations: Farmer; smuggler
- Conviction: Guilty
- Penalty: Death

Thomas Kingsmill (bapt. 22 January 1720 – 26 April 1749) was an English outlaw and one of the leaders of the notorious Hawkhurst Gang of smugglers that operated, from its base in Kent, along the South Coast of England from 1735 until 1749. One of the more infamous gangs of the early 18th century, they extended their influence from Hawkhurst, their base in Kent, along vast swathes of the South coast.

== Early life ==
A native of Goudhurst in Kent and the son of George Kingsmill and Sarah née Renalds, Thomas Kingsmill was baptised on 22 January 1720 at St. Mary's church in Goudhurst. Kingsmill reputedly had his first encounter with the Hawkhurst Gang when as a boy he looked after their horses during one of their smuggling actions. He passed some part of his life as a husbandman before joining the Hawkhurst Gang when he "made no scruple of entering into the most hazardous enterprises, and became so distinguished for his courageous -- or rather ferocious -- disposition that he was chosen captain of the gang."

== Custom House raid ==
In October 1747, members of the gang led a successful raid against a government Custom House in Poole, which was holding about thirty hundredweight (3,360 lbs) of tea, thirty-nine casks of brandy and rum, and a small bag of coffee captured from the smugglers' ship Three-Brothers in September. The shipment from Guernsey, worth about £500, had been organised by the Hawkhurst Gang working with a group from east Hampshire and was intended to be landed at Christchurch Bay, but was captured by a revenue vessel Swift commanded by Captain William Johnson on 22 September 1747. The goods were then taken to Poole, after the crew had escaped in a small boat.

At a meeting in Charlton Forest, Richard Perin, who had gone to Guernsey to buy the goods, made an agreement with the local men to recover the contraband. Thirty armed men, including Kingsmill, Fairall and about seven other Hawkhurst men, rode to Poole, stopping to rest in the New Forest. Arriving in Poole, at about 11 pm, they found that the customs house was under the guns of a naval sloop. The more local men were for abandoning the attempt, but the Hawkhurst men said they would continue alone, and it was then agreed that they would all continue. It was soon realised that as the tide fell the ship's guns would no longer be in sight of the customs house. The gang broke into the customs house around 2 am on 8 October, escaping on horseback with the tea. They left the brandy, rum and coffee at the customs house, presumably due to insufficient transport. The smugglers were not opposed at any stage of the journey. The Customs Service offered a large reward of £500 for their capture. After the capture of Arthur Gray in 1747 Kingsmill became the leader of the Hawkhurst Gang.

== The Battle of Goudhurst (1747) ==
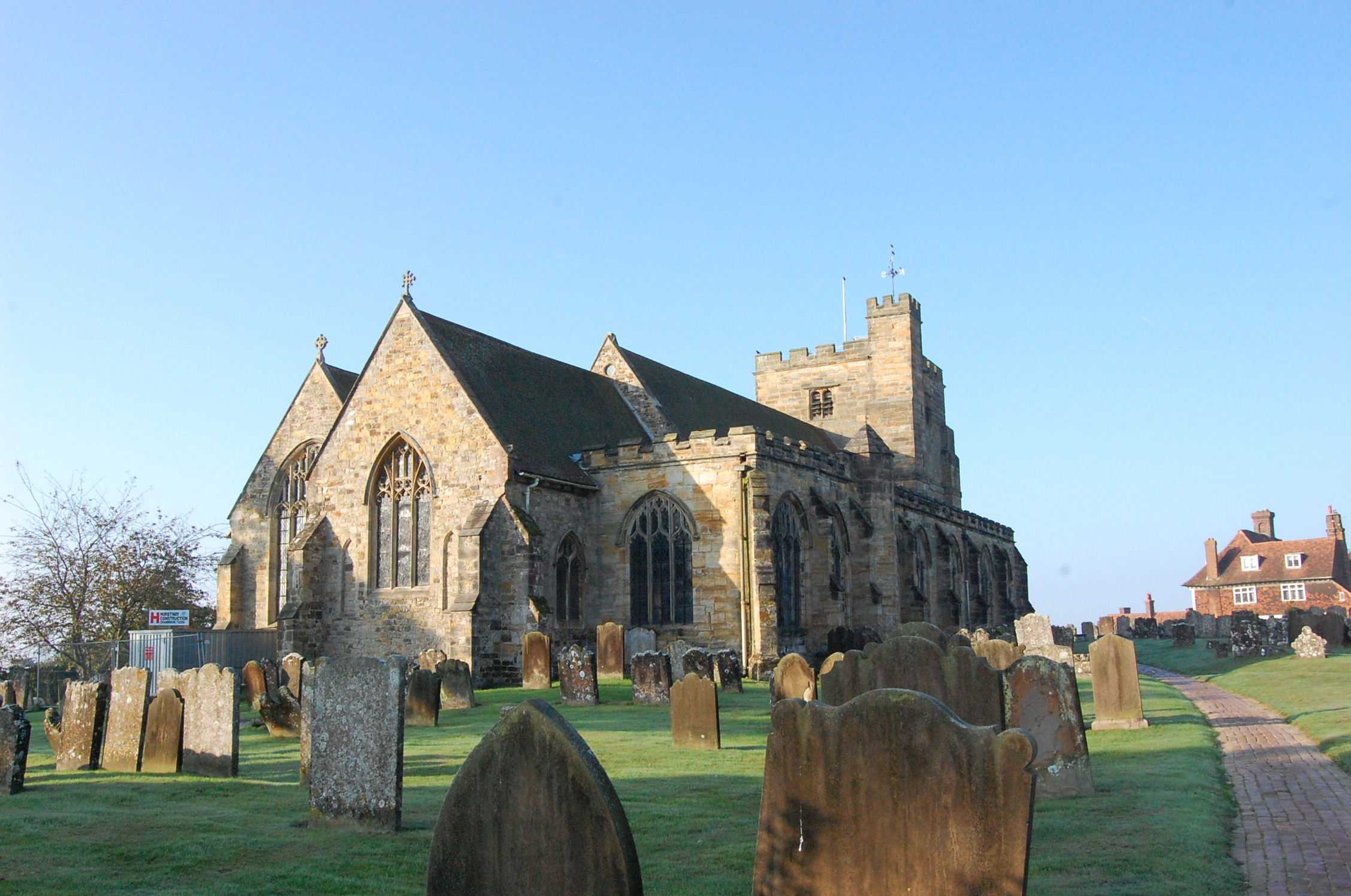
The Battle of Goudhurst took place around St. Mary's church in Goudhurst in 1749

When he heard that a Militia had been formed at Goudhurst under "General" William Sturt (1718-1797), actually a former army corporal, against the activities of the Gang Kingsmill became enraged by this act of defiance and threatened to burn the village and kill the residents unless the Militia was disbanded and Sturt handed over to the smugglers, setting an appointed time, 21 April 1747. Kingsmill's demands not being met, when the gang attacked on the appointed day during the Battle of Goudhurst they approached heavily armed with many stripped to the waist to display their scars and tattoos in an act of bravado and intimidation. The Militia held their ground and were well enough trained to shoot dead Kingsmill's brother George in the first volley of a battle fought around St. Mary's church. Two more smugglers died during the battle. The defeat at Goudhurst broke the power of the Hawkhurst Gang and ended their reign of terror. In 1748 the government issued a list of men wanted for murders, burglaries and robberies in Sussex as well as the Custom-house break-in at Poole. The list was published in the London Gazette along with a request for information leading to the arrest of the smugglers. Any informant was promised a royal pardon and as a further encouragement it offered a £50 reward for each smuggler who was captured.

== Capture and execution ==
Eventually, Thomas Kingsmill, alias Staymaker; William Fairall, alias Shepherd; Richard Perin, alias Pain, alias Carpenter; Thomas Lillywhite; and Richard Glover were all indicted for being concerned, with others, in breaking into the King's Custom-house, at Poole, and stealing thirty hundred weight of tea, to the value of £500 or more. They were imprisoned at Newgate Prison while awaiting trial. Having been found guilty Kingsmill and Fairall were taken for execution to Tyburn "in a cart with a guard of Horse and Foot Guards". The behaviour of Fairall and Kingsmill was remarkably undaunted; but all of them joined in devotion with the ordinary of Newgate when they came to the fatal tree." Kingsmill's body was delivered to the High Sheriff of Kent in order that it could be gibbeted at his native Goudhurst. William Sturt, the defender of Goudhurst, spent his last years as Warden of Goudhurst Workhouse.
