= Arthur Gray (Hawkhurst Gang) =

18th-century smuggler

Arthur Gray (c. 1713–1748) was one of the leaders of the Hawkhurst Gang that operated from its base in Kent, along the South Coast of England from 1735 until 1750. A charismatic leader described as a gentleman and "fop", he denied ever being involved in the smuggling himself, but acted as the mastermind behind Hawkhurst's operations.

== Biography ==
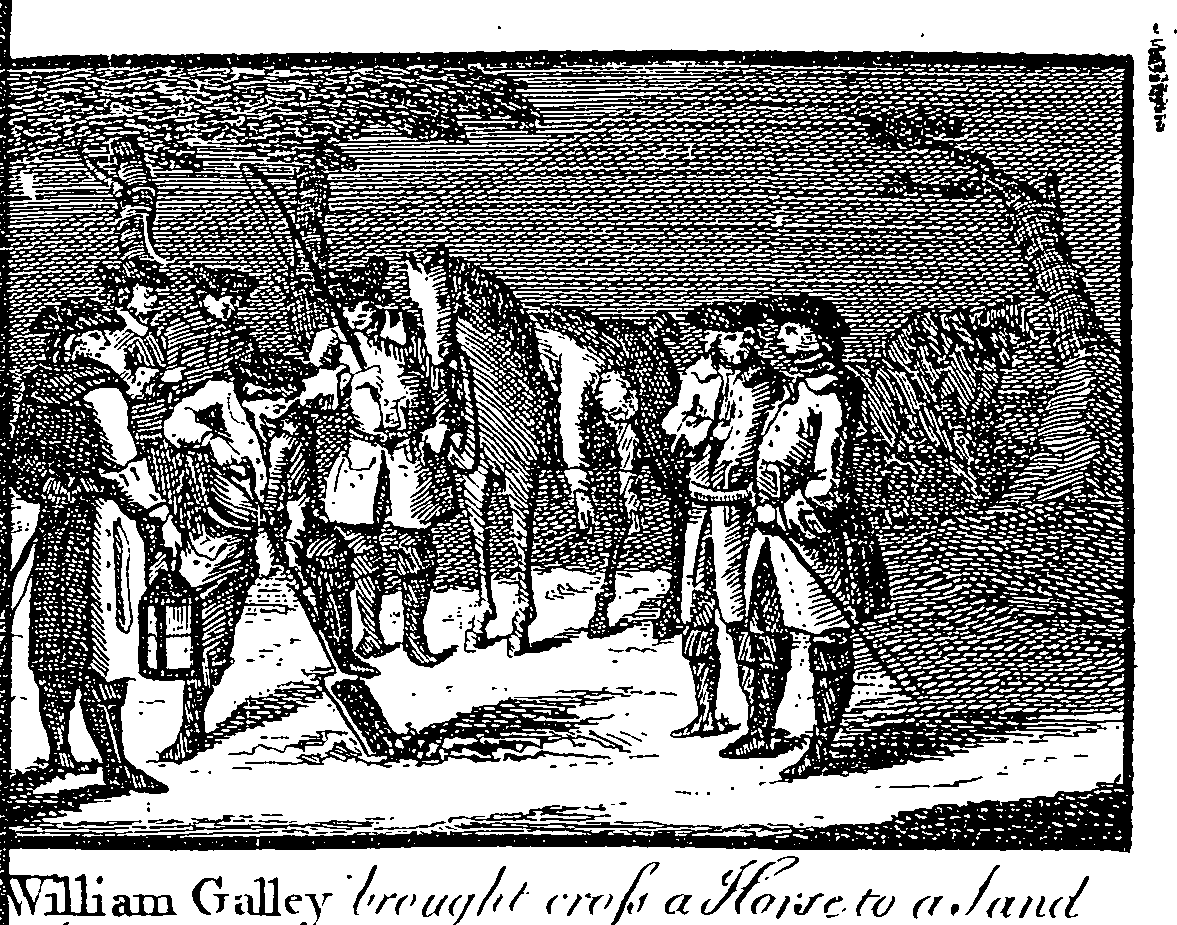
Depicting the murder of William Galley

Arthur Gray was born in about 1713, the eleventh of the thirteen children of William Gray Esq. and his wife Mary Gray. One of his brothers was William Gray, who was also involved with the gang.

Gray served as an apprentice to a butcher at Marden, near Maidstone, for seven years. He then returned to Hawkhurst, and there carried on his trade (as a butcher) for about three years. He then, by his own admission, spent more and more time in the company of smugglers, although denying ever smuggling himself. However, he was known to have become one of the leaders of the Hawkhurst Gang. Indeed, it is said that Gray lived in a large manor house outside Hawkhurst, from whence the gang derived its name.

Gray was tried for his offences at the Old Bailey and found guilty. He was executed at Tyburn, in London on 11 May 1748 and then gibbeted at Stamford Hill, Hackney. Gibbeting a body post execution was unusual for smugglers. It was normally a punishment reserved for criminals who had committed heinous crimes such as murder. The use of it on Gray coincided with the authorities desire to punish smugglers on the South coast and deter others from smuggling. Gray’s body was hung on a double gibbet, that had been used before, next to the body of a murderer. Gray remained in the gibbet until 1752 when his body was finally cut down.

The year following Gray's execution, Thomas Kingsmill, the gang's new leader, and Fairall were also hanged at Tyburn.
