= Listed buildings in Goudhurst =

Civil Parish in Kent, England

Goudhurst is a village and civil parish in the Borough of Tunbridge Wells of Kent, England. It contains 218 listed buildings that are recorded in the National Heritage List for England. Of these three are grade I, eight are grade II* and 207 are grade II.

This list is based on the information retrieved online from Historic England.

== Key ==
Grade	Criteria
I	Buildings that are of exceptional interest
II*	Particularly important buildings of more than special interest
II	Buildings that are of special interest

== Listing ==
Name	Grade	Location	Type	Completed (Note: The date given is the date used by Historic England as significant for the initial building or that of an important part in the structure's description.)	Date designated	Grid ref. (Note: The grid reference is based on the British national grid reference system, sometimes known as OSGB36, used by the Ordnance Survey.) Geo-coordinates	Notes	Entry number (Note: The "List Entry Number" is a unique number assigned to each listed building and scheduled monument by Historic England.)	Image	Wikidata
Stable and Barn About 50 Metres South West of Forge Farmhouse	II				22 June 1989	TQ7278335851; 51°05′45″N 0°27′58″E		1116118	Upload Photo	Q26409772
Tower Cottage	II				22 June 1989	TQ7167434686; 51°05′09″N 0°26′59″E		1084751	Upload Photo	Q26368951
Underhill Cottages	II	Balcombes Hill			22 June 1989	TQ7226037332; 51°06′34″N 0°27′34″E		1116111	Upload Photo	Q26409765
White's Farmhouse	II	Balcombes Hill			22 June 1989	TQ7240737436; 51°06′37″N 0°27′42″E		1084747	Upload Photo	Q26368929
Whites	II	Balcombes Hill			22 June 1989	TQ7235837423; 51°06′37″N 0°27′39″E		1084746	Upload Photo	Q26368925
Ballards Court Upper Ballards	II	Ballards Hill			25 October 1990	TQ7217339713; 51°07′51″N 0°27′33″E		1253148	Upload Photo	Q26544937
Blackbush	II	Bedgebury			22 June 1989	TQ7306035814; 51°05′44″N 0°28′12″E		1084748	Upload Photo	Q26368934
Forge Farmhouse	II	Bedgebury			20 June 1967	TQ7281135871; 51°05′46″N 0°28′00″E		1116115	Upload Photo	Q26409769
Oasthouse About 50 Metres West of Forge Farmhouse	II	Bedgebury			22 June 1989	TQ7278435871; 51°05′46″N 0°27′58″E		1084749	Upload Photo	Q26368940
Three Chimneys Farmhouse	II	Bedgebury			22 June 1989	TQ7290134742; 51°05′09″N 0°28′02″E		1084750	Upload Photo	Q26368945
Nos. 2 and 3 Bedgebury Cross and Sycamore Cottage	II	Bedgebury Cross			22 June 1989	TQ7170234670; 51°05′08″N 0°27′01″E		1116123	Upload Photo	Q26409776
Bridge and Dam Wall at Tq 721 339	II	Bedgebury Park			22 June 1989	TQ7205833919; 51°04′44″N 0°27′18″E		1084713	Upload Photo	Q26368749
Fountain About 25 Metres South East of Bedgebury Park House	II	Bedgebury Park			22 June 1989	TQ7216534383; 51°04′59″N 0°27′24″E		1338700	Upload Photo	Q26622998
Garden Urn About 100 Metres South East of Bedgebury Park House	II	Bedgebury Park			22 June 1989	TQ7223234346; 51°04′57″N 0°27′27″E		1084711	Upload Photo	Q26368738
Rain Pump at 723 348	II	Bedgebury Park			22 June 1989	TQ7231134767; 51°05′11″N 0°27′32″E		1084712	Upload Photo	Q26368744
The Lady's Well, Spring Head at 721 342	II	Spring Head At 721 342, Bedgebury Park			22 June 1989	TQ7213434149; 51°04′51″N 0°27′22″E		1338701	Upload Photo	Q26622999
Walled Garden Ay Home Farm	II	Bedgebury Park			22 June 1989	TQ7189434052; 51°04′48″N 0°27′09″E		1338702	Upload Photo	Q26623000
Beresford Lodge	II	Bedgebury Road			20 June 1967	TQ7221936146; 51°05′56″N 0°27′30″E		1115795	Upload Photo	Q26409484
Brownings	II	Bedgebury Road			22 June 1989	TQ7214336278; 51°06′00″N 0°27′26″E		1338703	Upload Photo	Q26623001
Granary About 30 Metres West of Little Marlingate	II	Bedgebury Road			22 June 1989	TQ7208935900; 51°05′48″N 0°27′23″E		1084716	Upload Photo	Q26368765
Little Marlingate	II	Bedgebury Road			22 June 1989	TQ7211835888; 51°05′47″N 0°27′24″E		1338704	Upload Photo	Q26623002
Little Pattenden	II	Bedgebury Road			20 June 1967	TQ7206536527; 51°06′08″N 0°27′22″E		1084714	Upload Photo	Q26368754
Marlingate and Projecting Wall	II	Bedgebury Road			7 March 1989	TQ7202835831; 51°05′46″N 0°27′19″E		1115804	Upload Photo	Q26409493
Pattyndenne Manor and Rear Courtyard	II*	Bedgebury Road	English country house		9 June 1952	TQ7199436585; 51°06′10″N 0°27′19″E		1320271	Pattyndenne Manor and Rear Courtyard More images	Q7148740
Barn About 30 Metres East of Hammonds Farmhouse	II	Blind Lane			22 June 1989	TQ7155238089; 51°06′59″N 0°26′59″E		1338667	Upload Photo	Q26622968
Cart Shed About 20 Metres South of Crowbourne Farmhouse	II	Blind Lane			22 June 1989	TQ7156537846; 51°06′51″N 0°26′59″E		1338705	Upload Photo	Q26623003
Cart Shed, About 100 Metres South West of Crowbourne Farmhouse	II	About 100 Metres South West Of Crowbourne Farmhouse, Blind Lane			22 June 1989	TQ7150937839; 51°06′51″N 0°26′56″E		1084718	Upload Photo	Q26368775
Crowbourne Farmhouse and Outhouse Attached	II	Blind Lane			22 June 1989	TQ7157437865; 51°06′52″N 0°27′00″E		1084717	Upload Photo	Q26368770
Hammonds Farmhouse	II	1 and 2, Blind Lane			22 June 1989	TQ7153838093; 51°06′59″N 0°26′58″E		1115763	Upload Photo	Q26409454
Outbuilding About 5 Metres West of Crowbourne Farmhouse	II	Blind Lane			22 June 1989	TQ7155537877; 51°06′52″N 0°26′59″E		1320261	Upload Photo	Q26606281
Small Barn/store About 30 Metres West of Crowbourne Farmhouse	II	Blind Lane			22 June 1989	TQ7153837866; 51°06′52″N 0°26′58″E		1115754	Upload Photo	Q26409446
Bruton House, Burgess Store and Goudhurst Antiques and Interiors	II	Burgess Store And Goudhurst Antiques And Interiors, High Street, Cranbrook, TN17 1AL			20 June 1967	TQ7225237746; 51°06′47″N 0°27′34″E		1338721	Upload Photo	Q26623017
Morebreddis Cottages	II	6-8, Chequers Lane			22 June 1989	TQ7302738040; 51°06′56″N 0°28′15″E		1084719	Upload Photo	Q26368780
Morebreddis Cottages	II	1-5, Chequers Lane			20 June 1967	TQ7303538058; 51°06′56″N 0°28′15″E		1115728	Upload Photo	Q26409424
Knight's Hole	II	Cherry Gardens Lane			22 June 1989	TQ7414738675; 51°07′15″N 0°29′13″E		1115740	Upload Photo	Q26409435
Roger's Rough	II	Chick's Lane			22 June 1989	TQ7029234961; 51°05′19″N 0°25′49″E		1084720	Upload Photo	Q26368786
Barn About 25 Metres North East of Lamberts	II	Church Road			22 June 1989	TQ7237037871; 51°06′51″N 0°27′40″E		1084721	Upload Photo	Q26368791
Blackman's Old Cottage	II	Church Road			20 June 1967	TQ7245937898; 51°06′52″N 0°27′45″E		1084722	Upload Photo	Q26368797
Chest Tomb About 5 Metres East of Church of St Mary	II	Church Road			22 June 1989	TQ7241237808; 51°06′49″N 0°27′43″E		1115579	Upload Photo	Q26409286
Chest Tomb to Daniel West, About 15 Metres South of Church of St Mary	II	About 15 Metres South Of Church Of St Mary, Church Road			22 June 1989	TQ7240437792; 51°06′49″N 0°27′42″E		1084726	Upload Photo	Q26368818
Christ Church	I	Church Road, Kilndown	church building		26 September 1980	TQ7006035187; 51°05′27″N 0°25′37″E		1338690	Christ Church More images	Q17524689
Church of St Mary	I	Church Road	church building		20 June 1967	TQ7239437810; 51°06′49″N 0°27′42″E		1338671	Church of St Mary More images	Q17524682
Coach House/schoolroom About 20 Metres South East of Maypole	II	Church Road			22 June 1989	TQ7274037895; 51°06′52″N 0°28′00″E		1084724	Upload Photo	Q26368808
Evanden Farmhouse	II	Church Road, Kilndown			22 June 1989	TQ6970834684; 51°05′11″N 0°25′18″E		1084694	Upload Photo	Q26368648
Garden Walls to North and North East of Maypole	II	Church Road			22 June 1989	TQ7273437944; 51°06′53″N 0°27′59″E		1115626	Upload Photo	Q26409327
Glebe House South View South View and Glebe House and Railed Forecourt	II	Church Road			22 June 1989	TQ7247737878; 51°06′51″N 0°27′46″E		1115666	Upload Photo	Q26409364
Group of 2 Headstones and 2 Chest Tombs About 20 Metres North of Church of St Mary	II	Church Road			22 June 1989	TQ7239937842; 51°06′50″N 0°27′42″E		1115564	Upload Photo	Q26409273
Group of 4 Chest Tombs About 5-10 Metres South West of Church of St Mary	II	Church Road			22 June 1989	TQ7237637798; 51°06′49″N 0°27′41″E		1084725	Upload Photo	Q26368812
Group of 5 Chest Tombs About 10 to 25 Metres South West of Church of St Mary	II	Church Road			22 June 1989	TQ7236037800; 51°06′49″N 0°27′40″E		1115572	Upload Photo	Q26409281
Headstone to Elizabeth Bridgland About 5 Metres South of Church of St Mary	II	Church Road			22 June 1989	TQ7239637797; 51°06′49″N 0°27′42″E		1115573	Upload Photo	Q26409282
Headstone to Mary Imell(?) About 20 Metres West of Church of St Mary	II	Church Road			22 June 1989	TQ7235437810; 51°06′49″N 0°27′40″E		1338689	Upload Photo	Q26622988
Headstone to Robert Fuller(?) About 30 Metres East of Church of St Mary	II	Church Road			22 June 1989	TQ7242437804; 51°06′49″N 0°27′43″E		1084727	Upload Photo	Q26368823
Kilndown Old School	II	Church Road, Kilndown, Cranbrook, TN17 2SF			22 June 1989	TQ7005035226; 51°05′28″N 0°25′37″E		1084689	Upload Photo	Q26368619
Lamberts Yew Tree Cottage	II	Church Road			20 June 1967	TQ7234737858; 51°06′51″N 0°27′39″E		1338668	Upload Photo	Q26622969
Little Mill House Mill House	II	Church Road			22 June 1989	TQ7250137892; 51°06′52″N 0°27′47″E		1084723	Upload Photo	Q26368802
Lychgate and Walls About 25 Metres West of Christ Church	II	Church Road, Kilndown			22 June 1989	TQ7003135199; 51°05′27″N 0°25′36″E		1084690	Upload Photo	Q26368624
Maypole	II*	Church Road			22 June 1989	TQ7272937913; 51°06′52″N 0°27′59″E		1338670	Upload Photo	Q17547739
Memorial Cross to Emily Harrison About 1 Metre East of Christ Church	II	Church Road, Kilndown			22 June 1989	TQ7007335180; 51°05′27″N 0°25′38″E		1084693	Upload Photo	Q26368642
Mouseden	II	Church Road, Kilndown			22 June 1989	TQ6928634813; 51°05′16″N 0°24′57″E		1338693	Upload Photo	Q26622991
Outhouse About 20 Metres North East of Mill House	II	Church Road			22 June 1989	TQ7248137896; 51°06′52″N 0°27′46″E		1115650	Upload Photo	Q26409349
Row of 3 Headstones, About 20 Metres North West of Church of St Mary	II	About 20 Metres North West Of Church Of St Mary, Church Road			22 June 1989	TQ7236037828; 51°06′50″N 0°27′40″E		1084729	Upload Photo	Q26368835
Row of Chest Tombs About 30 to 40 Metres North West of Church of St Mary	II	Church Road			22 June 1989	TQ7234737832; 51°06′50″N 0°27′39″E		1084730	Upload Photo	Q26368841
Shernfold Farmhouse	II	Church Road, Kilndown			22 June 1989	TQ6982334825; 51°05′15″N 0°25′24″E		1338692	Upload Photo	Q26622990
Sundial About 30 Metres North East of Church of St Mary	II	Church Road			22 June 1989	TQ7244537837; 51°06′50″N 0°27′44″E		1084728	Upload Photo	Q26368829
The Old Lime House	II	Church Road			20 June 1967	TQ7245837867; 51°06′51″N 0°27′45″E		1115699	Upload Photo	Q26409397
Tomb of A J Beresford Hope, About 1 Metre South West of Christ Church	II	About 1 Metre South West Of Christ Church, Church Road, Kilndown			22 June 1989	TQ7004135188; 51°05′27″N 0°25′36″E		1084691	Upload Photo	Q26368631
Tomb of John, 2nd Baron Decies, About 1 Metre South of Christ Church	II	2nd Baron Decies, About 1 Metre South Of Christ Church, Church Road, Kilndown			22 June 1989	TQ7004735184; 51°05′27″N 0°25′37″E		1338691	Upload Photo	Q26622989
Tomb of Marshall Viscount Beresford, About 1 Metre South of Christ Church	II	About 1 Metre South Of Christ Church, Church Road, Kilndown			22 June 1989	TQ7005135182; 51°05′27″N 0°25′37″E		1084692	Upload Photo	Q26368636
Two Headstones, with Barrel Chests and Chest Tomb About 25 Metres East of Church of St Mary	II	With Barrel Chests And Chest Tomb About 25 Metres East Of Church Of St Mary, Church Road			22 June 1989	TQ7243337828; 51°06′50″N 0°27′44″E		1115581	Upload Photo	Q26409288
Water Pump About 1 Metre South of Lamberts	II	Church Road			22 June 1989	TQ7235137851; 51°06′51″N 0°27′39″E		1115704	Upload Photo	Q26409402
Weavers' Cottages	II	1 and 2, Church Road			20 June 1967	TQ7241537868; 51°06′51″N 0°27′43″E		1115719	Upload Photo	Q26409415
Weavers' Cottages	II	3-7, Church Road			20 June 1967	TQ7243437865; 51°06′51″N 0°27′44″E		1338669	Upload Photo	Q26685069
Clayhill	II	Clayhill			22 June 1989	TQ7208837563; 51°06′41″N 0°27′25″E		1115397	Upload Photo	Q26409135
Clayhill Cottages	II	Clayhill			22 June 1989	TQ7206837580; 51°06′42″N 0°27′24″E		1084695	Upload Photo	Q26368653
Combourne Cottages	II	Combourne			22 June 1989	TQ7415939768; 51°07′51″N 0°29′16″E		1084696	Upload Photo	Q26368658
Combourne Farmhouse	II	Combourne			22 June 1989	TQ7420839737; 51°07′49″N 0°29′18″E		1115143	Upload Photo	Q26408891
Little Combourne Farmhouse	II	Combourne			22 June 1989	TQ7429739633; 51°07′46″N 0°29′23″E		1338694	Upload Photo	Q26622992
Oasthouse About 30 Metres North East of Little Combourne Farmhouse	II	Combourne			22 June 1989	TQ7432039659; 51°07′47″N 0°29′24″E		1139036	Upload Photo	Q26431990
Stable/cartsheds About 15 Metres South of Combourne Cottages	II	Combourne			22 June 1989	TQ7415939741; 51°07′50″N 0°29′16″E		1115148	Upload Photo	Q26408895
Beechurst	II	Cranbrook Road			22 June 1989	TQ7317637852; 51°06′50″N 0°28′22″E		1084697	Upload Photo	Q26368664
Black Swan Hall	II	Cranbrook Road			22 June 1989	TQ7321737815; 51°06′48″N 0°28′24″E		1338697	Upload Photo	Q26622995
Gill House	II	Cranbrook Road			22 June 1989	TQ7434737487; 51°06′37″N 0°29′21″E		1084700	Upload Photo	Q26368680
Holly House	II	Cranbrook Road			20 June 1967	TQ7311737828; 51°06′49″N 0°28′19″E		1084701	Upload Photo	Q26368688
Holly Villas	II	1 and 2, Cranbrook Road			20 June 1967	TQ7308037835; 51°06′49″N 0°28′17″E		1338698	Upload Photo	Q26622996
Iden Green Cottages	II	1 and 2, Cranbrook Road			22 June 1989	TQ7427037561; 51°06′39″N 0°29′18″E		1139046	Upload Photo	Q26432000
Iden Green Cottages	II	6, Cranbrook Road			22 June 1989	TQ7430537558; 51°06′39″N 0°29′19″E		1338696	Upload Photo	Q26685071
Iden House Iden House, Or Old Swatlands Old Swatlands	II	Cranbrook Road			22 June 1989	TQ7409637542; 51°06′39″N 0°29′09″E		1139022	Upload Photo	Q26431980
Lime Trees Farmhouse	II	Cranbrook Road			22 June 1989	TQ7384137700; 51°06′44″N 0°28′56″E		1338695	Upload Photo	Q26622993
Little Holt	II	Cranbrook Road			11 March 1982	TQ7329437859; 51°06′50″N 0°28′28″E		1139043	Upload Photo	Q26431997
Old Park Cottage	II	Cranbrook Road			22 June 1989	TQ7489438120; 51°06′56″N 0°29′51″E		1084699	Upload Photo	Q26368675
Old Peacock Cottage	II	Cranbrook Road			22 June 1989	TQ7462437474; 51°06′36″N 0°29′36″E		1139050	Upload Photo	Q26432003
The Peakcock Inn	II	Cranbrook Road	inn		22 June 1989	TQ7473737424; 51°06′34″N 0°29′41″E		1139019	The Peakcock Inn More images	Q26431978
Triggs Farmhouse	II	Cranbrook Road			20 June 1967	TQ7300337480; 51°06′38″N 0°28′12″E		1138983	Upload Photo	Q26431949
Tylers	II	Cranbrook Road			22 June 1989	TQ7312337818; 51°06′49″N 0°28′19″E		1329914	Upload Photo	Q26615099
Well House	II	Cranbrook Road			20 June 1967	TQ7414337594; 51°06′40″N 0°29′11″E		1084698	Upload Photo	Q26368669
Curfew Cottage	II	Curtisden Green			22 June 1989	TQ7412440488; 51°08′14″N 0°29′15″E		1084702	Upload Photo	Q26368694
Curtisden Green Farmhouse	II	Curtisden Green			22 June 1989	TQ7418640466; 51°08′13″N 0°29′18″E		1139459	Upload Photo	Q26432330
Barn and Attached Outhouses About 100 Metres North West of Finchcocks	II	Finchcocks			22 June 1989	TQ6996736544; 51°06′11″N 0°25′35″E		1084705	Upload Photo	Q26368711
Coachhouse About 50 Metres North West of Finchcock	II	Finchcocks			22 June 1989	TQ7001636523; 51°06′10″N 0°25′37″E		1338699	Upload Photo	Q26622997
Finchcocks	I	Finchcocks	English country house		9 June 1952	TQ7003836460; 51°06′08″N 0°25′38″E		1318935	Finchcocks More images	Q5449829
Finchcocks Bridge	II	Finchcocks			22 June 1989	TQ6999536801; 51°06′19″N 0°25′37″E		1084703	Upload Photo	Q26368700
Ha Ha About 75 Metres West of Finchcocks	II	Finchcocks			22 June 1989	TQ6995636399; 51°06′06″N 0°25′34″E		1145837	Upload Photo	Q26438981
Stables About 50 Metres North of Finchcocks	II	Finchcocks			22 June 1989	TQ7003136540; 51°06′11″N 0°25′38″E		1318918	Upload Photo	Q26605026
Walled Garden and Summerhouse About 50 Metres South East of Finchcocks	II	Finchcocks			22 June 1989	TQ6995836348; 51°06′04″N 0°25′34″E		1084704	Upload Photo	Q26368706
Property Adjacent to Weekes Bakery, Formerly A L Remnant, Tobacconist	II	Formerly A L Remnant, Tobacconist, High Street			22 June 1989	TQ7224937768; 51°06′48″N 0°27′34″E		1084668	Upload Photo	Q26368504
Lollards	II	Gore Lane			22 June 1989	TQ7243339587; 51°07′47″N 0°27′47″E		1318922	Upload Photo	Q26605030
Grange Farm Cottage	II	Grange Lane			22 June 1989	TQ7243438615; 51°07′15″N 0°27′45″E		1084706	Upload Photo	Q26368716
The Grange	II	Grange Lane			22 June 1989	TQ7254238408; 51°07′08″N 0°27′50″E		1084707	Upload Photo	Q26368722
Grove Place	II	Grove Corner			22 June 1989	TQ7240939293; 51°07′37″N 0°27′45″E		1318891	Upload Photo	Q26605002
Barn About 30 Metres East of Little Bewl Bridge Farmhouse	II	Hastings Road			22 June 1989	TQ6872334575; 51°05′08″N 0°24′28″E		1084709	Upload Photo	Q26368733
Hillside Farm Cottage	II	Hastings Road			22 June 1989	TQ6887434560; 51°05′08″N 0°24′35″E		1338716	Upload Photo	Q26623013
Little Bewl Bridge Farmhouse	II	Hastings Road			22 June 1989	TQ6868834582; 51°05′09″N 0°24′26″E		1145855	Upload Photo	Q26439004
South Lodge	II	Hastings Road			22 June 1989	TQ6923134345; 51°05′00″N 0°24′53″E		1084708	Upload Photo	Q26368727
Bank House	II	High Street			20 June 1967	TQ7227037759; 51°06′48″N 0°27′35″E		1084675	Upload Photo	Q26368542
Church Cottage Church House	II*	High Street			9 June 1952	TQ7232737819; 51°06′50″N 0°27′38″E		1338719	Upload Photo	Q17547749
Former Lloyds Bank, Former Eight Bells Inn and Spyways	II	High Street, Cranbrook, TN17 1AL			20 June 1967	TQ7230937781; 51°06′48″N 0°27′37″E		1338720	Upload Photo	Q26623016
Fountain House	II	High Street			20 June 1967	TQ7226237755; 51°06′48″N 0°27′35″E		1299064	Upload Photo	Q26586491
Goudhurst House and Newsagent's Shop	II	High Street			22 June 1989	TQ7230237818; 51°06′50″N 0°27′37″E		1084672	Upload Photo	Q26368526
Greenaways Shop and House Attached	II	High Street			20 June 1967	TQ7228137767; 51°06′48″N 0°27′36″E		1186741	Upload Photo	Q26481981
Little Cot	II	High Street			20 June 1967	TQ7226437788; 51°06′49″N 0°27′35″E		1338717	Upload Photo	Q26623014
Manor Cottage with Projecting Wall and the Pharmacy	II	High Street			20 June 1967	TQ7228137789; 51°06′49″N 0°27′36″E		1338718	Upload Photo	Q26623015
Pharmacy Cottage	II	High Street			20 June 1967	TQ7227437789; 51°06′49″N 0°27′35″E		1084670	Upload Photo	Q26368514
The Manor House with Projecting Wall	II	High Street			20 June 1967	TQ7228237804; 51°06′49″N 0°27′36″E		1084671	Upload Photo	Q26368520
The Star and Eagle Hotel and Wall Attached	II	High Street, Cranbrook, TN17 1AL	hotel		9 June 1952	TQ7233337786; 51°06′48″N 0°27′38″E		1084673	The Star and Eagle Hotel and Wall Attached More images	Q26368532
Trundles	II	High Street, TN17 1AL			22 June 1989	TQ7229537775; 51°06′48″N 0°27′36″E		1084674	Upload Photo	Q26368537
Weeks Bakery	II	High Street			22 June 1989	TQ7225737776; 51°06′48″N 0°27′34″E		1084669	Upload Photo	Q26368510
Little Horden	II	Horden			22 June 1989	TQ7559340316; 51°08′07″N 0°30′30″E		1186754	Upload Photo	Q26481993
Goudhurst Butchers, House Attached and Rear Courtyard	II	House Attached And Rear Courtyard, The Plain			22 June 1989	TQ7223037698; 51°06′46″N 0°27′33″E		1338709	Upload Photo	Q26623007
The Cottage	II	Hunts Lane			22 June 1989	TQ7223537792; 51°06′49″N 0°27′33″E		1084648	Upload Photo	Q26368423
Cherry Garden Farmhouse and Outbuilding Attached	II	Jarvis Lane			20 June 1967	TQ7371338408; 51°07′07″N 0°28′50″E		1338722	Upload Photo	Q26623018
Lock and Key Cottage	II	Jarvis Lane			20 June 1967	TQ7377338489; 51°07′10″N 0°28′54″E		1186767	Upload Photo	Q26482003
Outbuilding About 25 Metres North of Cherry Garden Farmhouse	II	Jarvis Lane			22 June 1989	TQ7373138427; 51°07′08″N 0°28′51″E		1084677	Upload Photo	Q26368556
Baker's Farmhouse	II	Ladham Road			20 June 1967	TQ7395539471; 51°07′41″N 0°29′05″E		1087098	Upload Photo	Q26379573
Forstall Cottage	II	Ladham Road			2 April 1991	TQ7356238947; 51°07′25″N 0°28′44″E		1338767	Upload Photo	Q26623061
Lady Oak	II	Lady Oak Lane			22 June 1989	TQ7112632505; 51°03′59″N 0°26′27″E		1338723	Upload Photo	Q26623019
Coachhouse Block About 25 Metres West of Lidwells	II	Lidwells Lane			22 June 1989	TQ7232738639; 51°07′16″N 0°27′40″E		1084678	Upload Photo	Q26368561
Lidwells	II	Lidwells Lane			22 June 1989	TQ7235638648; 51°07′16″N 0°27′41″E		1087109	Upload Photo	Q26379582
Stables About 20 Metres North West Off Trottenden	II	Lidwells Lane			22 June 1989	TQ7159838377; 51°07′08″N 0°27′02″E		1084679	Upload Photo	Q26368566
Trottenden	II	Lidwells Lane			22 June 1989	TQ7162138361; 51°07′08″N 0°27′03″E		1335821	Upload Photo	Q26620382
Barn About 1 Metre East of Nursery Farmhouse	II	London Road			22 June 1989	TQ6936834122; 51°04′53″N 0°25′00″E		1084682	Upload Photo	Q26368581
Barn and Outbuildings About 100 Metres South of Clingley Manor	II	London Road			22 June 1989	TQ6931033288; 51°04′26″N 0°24′55″E		1338687	Upload Photo	Q26622986
Brick Kiln Cottage	II	London Road			22 June 1989	TQ7312733759; 51°04′37″N 0°28′12″E		1087044	Upload Photo	Q26379528
Chingley Manor	II	London Road			22 June 1989	TQ6937433330; 51°04′27″N 0°24′59″E		1087040	Upload Photo	Q26379525
Combwell Priory and Walled Garden	II	London Road			9 June 1952	TQ7056733331; 51°04′26″N 0°26′00″E		1087085	Upload Photo	Q26379562
Forge House	II	London Road			22 June 1989	TQ6990433138; 51°04′21″N 0°25′26″E		1084680	Upload Photo	Q26368572
Kilndown Poultry Farm	II	London Road			22 June 1989	TQ6959534241; 51°04′57″N 0°25′12″E		1087079	Upload Photo	Q26379556
Nursery Farmhouse	II	London Road			22 June 1989	TQ6936434107; 51°04′53″N 0°25′00″E		1084681	Upload Photo	Q26368577
Oast House About 130 Metres East of Nursery Farmhouse	II	London Road			22 June 1989	TQ6936234139; 51°04′54″N 0°25′00″E		1335847	Upload Photo	Q26620403
Stonecrouch	II	London Road			8 June 1986	TQ6999033151; 51°04′21″N 0°25′30″E		1338724	Upload Photo	Q26623020
Badgers	II	Marden Road			22 June 1989	TQ7257340123; 51°08′04″N 0°27′55″E		1084683	Upload Photo	Q26368587
Finchurst	II	Marden Road			20 June 1967	TQ7255540210; 51°08′07″N 0°27′54″E		1086981	Upload Photo	Q26379468
Milestone at 723 396 on the B2079	II	Marden Road			22 June 1989	TQ7232139600; 51°07′47″N 0°27′41″E		1338688	Upload Photo	Q26622987
Monk's	II	Marden Road			19 October 1970	TQ7256140036; 51°08′01″N 0°27′54″E		1084684	Upload Photo	Q26368591
Shear Farmhouse	II	Marden Road			22 June 1989	TQ7231439508; 51°07′44″N 0°27′40″E		1086991	Upload Photo	Q26379485
Stream Farm	II	Marden Road			22 June 1989	TQ7273440091; 51°08′03″N 0°28′03″E		1087009	Upload Photo	Q26379500
Lower Maypole Cottage	II	Maypole Lane			22 June 1989	TQ7239737530; 51°06′40″N 0°27′41″E		1084685	Upload Photo	Q26368597
1 and 2 Meadow View	II	1 and 2, Meadow View, Jarvis Lane, TN17 1LW, Worms Hill			22 June 1989	TQ7398740001; 51°07′58″N 0°29′07″E		1084630	Upload Photo	Q26368392
Briars	II	Mile Lane			22 June 1989	TQ7395337782; 51°06′47″N 0°29′02″E		1335885	Upload Photo	Q26620434
Chequer Tree Farm	II	Mile Lane			20 June 1967	TQ7408937752; 51°06′45″N 0°29′09″E		1084686	Upload Photo	Q26368603
Cliffe Cottages First Cottage First Cottage and Middle Cottage, Cliffe Cottages Middle Cottage	II	North Road			20 June 1967	TQ7221137814; 51°06′49″N 0°27′32″E		1084649	Upload Photo	Q26368425
Cliffe Cottages, 4 North Road	II	4, North Road			20 June 1967	TQ7221537825; 51°06′50″N 0°27′32″E		1338706	Upload Photo	Q26685073
Cliffe Cottages, 5 North Road	II	5, North Road			20 June 1967	TQ7221737828; 51°06′50″N 0°27′33″E		1084650	Upload Photo	Q26368429
High View	II	North Road			22 June 1989	TQ7236038074; 51°06′58″N 0°27′40″E		1084688	Upload Photo	Q26368614
Parkview	II	North Road, Gouldhurst, TN17 1JA			22 June 1989	TQ7240938146; 51°07′00″N 0°27′43″E		1086968	Upload Photo	Q26379448
Ratcliffe House Ratcliffe House and Russets and Stable Wing Attached Russets	II	North Road			22 June 1989	TQ7240838122; 51°06′59″N 0°27′43″E		1084687	Upload Photo	Q26368607
Spring Cottage	II	North Road			22 June 1989	TQ7227337967; 51°06′54″N 0°27′36″E		1338707	Upload Photo	Q26623005
Barn, Now Garage, About 25 Metres South of Little Horden	II	Horden			22 June 1989	TQ7559940285; 51°08′06″N 0°30′31″E		1084676	Upload Photo	Q26368549
Gates, Piers and Quadrant Walls Adjacent to Beresford Lodge	II	Bedgebury Road			22 June 1989	TQ7220536137; 51°05′55″N 0°27′29″E		1084715	Upload Photo	Q26368759
Oasthouse About 5 Metres West of Prior's Farmhouse	II	Prior's Heath			22 June 1989	TQ7136534863; 51°05′15″N 0°26′44″E		1338710	Upload Photo	Q26623008
Prior's Heath Farmhouse	II	Prior's Heath			22 June 1989	TQ7135034852; 51°05′15″N 0°26′43″E		1326679	Upload Photo	Q26612143
Bridge at Risebridge (712 367)	II	Ranters Lane, Risebridge			22 June 1989	TQ7126536646; 51°06′13″N 0°26′42″E		1326643	Upload Photo	Q26612116
Mount Pleasant	II	Ranters Lane, Risebridge			22 June 1989	TQ7126136746; 51°06′16″N 0°26′42″E		1338711	Upload Photo	Q26623009
Ranters Hall	II	Ranters Lane			22 June 1989	TQ7144937071; 51°06′26″N 0°26′52″E		1104878	Upload Photo	Q26398844
Risebridge Farmhouse	II*	Ranters Lane, Risebridge			22 June 1989	TQ7136736703; 51°06′14″N 0°26′47″E		1084656	Upload Photo	Q17547302
Zion Farm Cottages	II	Ranters Lane			22 June 1989	TQ7149737231; 51°06′31″N 0°26′55″E		1084657	Upload Photo	Q26368451
Oasthouse About 50 Metres North East of Riseden Farmhouse	II	Riseden			22 June 1989	TQ7037436056; 51°05′55″N 0°25′55″E		1084658	Upload Photo	Q26368455
Riseden Cottage	II	Riseden			22 June 1989	TQ7038735991; 51°05′52″N 0°25′55″E		1338712	Upload Photo	Q26623010
Riseden Farm Cottages	II	Riseden			22 June 1989	TQ7032936097; 51°05′56″N 0°25′53″E		1104889	Upload Photo	Q26398851
Riseden Farmhouse	II	Riseden			20 June 1967	TQ7033836055; 51°05′55″N 0°25′53″E		1104885	Upload Photo	Q26398849
Barn About 20 Metres West of Hillside Farmhouse	II	Riseden Lane			22 June 1989	TQ7008235448; 51°05′35″N 0°25′39″E		1104845	Upload Photo	Q26398811
Barn About 20 Metres to South of Trillinghurst Farmhouse	II	Riseden Lane			22 June 1989	TQ7115436271; 51°06′01″N 0°26′35″E		1084659	Upload Photo	Q26368460
Barn and Stable About 20 Metres North of Gatehouse	II*	Riseden Lane			22 June 1989	TQ7055835987; 51°05′52″N 0°26′04″E		1338713	Upload Photo	Q17547744
Barn and Stables About 30 Metres East of Twysden	II	Riseden Lane			22 June 1989	TQ7020635913; 51°05′50″N 0°25′46″E		1104850	Upload Photo	Q26398818
Gatehouse and Restored Early C20 Wall to Front Garden Wall (attached)	II*	Riseden Lane			9 June 1952	TQ7055135953; 51°05′51″N 0°26′04″E		1104867	Upload Photo	Q17547392
Hillside Farmhouse	II	Riseden Lane			22 June 1989	TQ7010235436; 51°05′35″N 0°25′40″E		1084661	Upload Photo	Q26368469
Kilndown House and Wall Projecting	II	Riseden Lane			22 June 1989	TQ7015935609; 51°05′40″N 0°25′43″E		1084660	Upload Photo	Q26368464
Marigolds	II	Riseden Lane			22 June 1989	TQ7040735927; 51°05′50″N 0°25′56″E		1084662	Upload Photo	Q26368473
Paine's Farmhouse	II	Riseden Lane			22 June 1989	TQ7111536516; 51°06′09″N 0°26′34″E		1104852	Upload Photo	Q26398820
Stable Courtyard About 25 Metres West of Kilndown House	II	Riseden Lane			22 June 1989	TQ7012835606; 51°05′40″N 0°25′41″E		1104839	Upload Photo	Q26398805
Trillinghurst Farmhouse	II	Riseden Lane			22 June 1989	TQ7117036290; 51°06′01″N 0°26′36″E		1326676	Upload Photo	Q26612140
Twysden	II	Riseden Lane			20 June 1967	TQ7016835907; 51°05′50″N 0°25′44″E		1338714	Upload Photo	Q26623011
Blackberry Cottage Summerhill Cottage	II	Rogers Rough Road			22 June 1989	TQ7017935130; 51°05′25″N 0°25′43″E		1338715	Upload Photo	Q26623012
Smugley Farmhouse	II	Smugley Lane			9 June 1952	TQ7252436552; 51°06′08″N 0°27′46″E		1105685	Upload Photo	Q26399618
Bedgebury Park, Stable Courts and Garden Terraces	II*	Bedgebury Park	school building		19 March 1982	TQ7211734376; 51°04′58″N 0°27′21″E		1084710	Bedgebury Park, Stable Courts and Garden Terraces More images	Q17547307
Hope Mill	II	Station Road			20 June 1967	TQ7079837205; 51°06′31″N 0°26′19″E		1084663	Upload Photo	Q26368479
Hope Mill House	II	Station Road			22 June 1989	TQ7080137189; 51°06′31″N 0°26′19″E		1084664	Upload Photo	Q26368483
Swan Farmhouse	II	Swan Lane			22 June 1989	TQ7276239402; 51°07′40″N 0°28′03″E		1326279	Upload Photo	Q26611772
Little Tattlebury Tattlebury	II	Tattlebury Corner			20 June 1967	TQ7274337961; 51°06′54″N 0°28′00″E		1105648	Upload Photo	Q26399583
Oak House	II	Tattlebury Corner			22 June 1989	TQ7276337966; 51°06′54″N 0°28′01″E		1084666	Upload Photo	Q26368493
Tattlebury Gallery the Wine List	II	Tattlebury Corner			22 June 1989	TQ7273137968; 51°06′54″N 0°27′59″E		1084665	Upload Photo	Q26368487
Ex Servicemen's Club	II	The Plain			22 June 1989	TQ7217337728; 51°06′47″N 0°27′30″E		1084651	Upload Photo	Q26368432
Forge House and Railed Forecourt	II	The Plain			22 June 1989	TQ7224037712; 51°06′46″N 0°27′33″E		1084653	Upload Photo	Q26368439
Hughenden	II	The Plain			22 June 1989	TQ7217237678; 51°06′45″N 0°27′30″E		1104936	Upload Photo	Q26398898
Outbuilding About 5 Metres South of Hughenden	II	The Plain			22 June 1989	TQ7218037666; 51°06′45″N 0°27′30″E		1084655	Upload Photo	Q26368446
Stable/coach House About 10 Metres North of Vine Hotel	II	The Plain			20 June 1967	TQ7222037775; 51°06′48″N 0°27′33″E		1338708	Upload Photo	Q26623006
The Village Hall	II	The Plain			22 June 1989	TQ7220237651; 51°06′44″N 0°27′31″E		1084654	Upload Photo	Q26368442
The Vine Hotel the Vine Hotel and Assembly Room	II	The Plain	building		20 June 1967	TQ7223237761; 51°06′48″N 0°27′33″E		1084652	The Vine Hotel the Vine Hotel and Assembly Room More images	Q26368435
Water Trough on the Plain	II	The Plain			22 June 1989	TQ7221137716; 51°06′46″N 0°27′32″E		1334373	Upload Photo	Q26619041
Raised Pavement Fronting the Star and Eagle Hotel, to Spyways	II	To Spyways, High Street			22 June 1989	TQ7233037794; 51°06′49″N 0°27′38″E		1145924	Upload Photo	Q26439074
Barn and Stable Range About 50 Metres North West of Twyssenden	II	Twyssenden, Twyssenden Manor			22 June 1989	TQ7139435258; 51°05′28″N 0°26′46″E		1084667	Upload Photo	Q26368499
Granary About 20 Metres West of Twyssenden	II	Twyssenden, Twyssenden Manor			22 June 1989	TQ7136235241; 51°05′27″N 0°26′44″E		1106359	Upload Photo	Q26400228
Twyssenden Manor and Wall Projecting	II*	Twyssenden, Twyssenden Manor			9 June 1952	TQ7136035207; 51°05′26″N 0°26′44″E		1106244	Upload Photo	Q17547397
White's Cottage and White's Lodge, Wall and Gate Piers Attached	II	Balcombes Hill			22 June 1989	TQ7238437470; 51°06′38″N 0°27′40″E		1320063	Upload Photo	Q26606104
Candleglow Cottage	II	West Road			22 June 1989	TQ7215937671; 51°06′45″N 0°27′29″E		1106333	Upload Photo	Q26400203
Cottage Attached to Rear of the Old Bricklayers	II	West Road			22 June 1989	TQ7213237629; 51°06′44″N 0°27′28″E		1338734	Upload Photo	Q26623029
The Old Bricklayers	II	West Road			22 June 1989	TQ7212837640; 51°06′44″N 0°27′28″E		1084629	Upload Photo	Q26368390
Twitten Cottages	II	1-3, West Road			22 June 1989	TQ7216337650; 51°06′44″N 0°27′29″E		1338733	Upload Photo	Q26623028
West House	II	West Road			20 June 1967	TQ7214837655; 51°06′44″N 0°27′29″E		1084628	Upload Photo	Q26368389

== See also ==
- Grade I listed buildings in Kent
- Grade II* listed buildings in Kent

== Sources ==
- Newman, John (2012) [1969], Kent: West and the Weald, The Buildings of England, New Haven and London: Yale University Press, ISBN 978-0-300-18509-6
