= Richard Carpenter (architect) =

English Gothic Revival architect (1841–1893)

Richard Herbert Carpenter
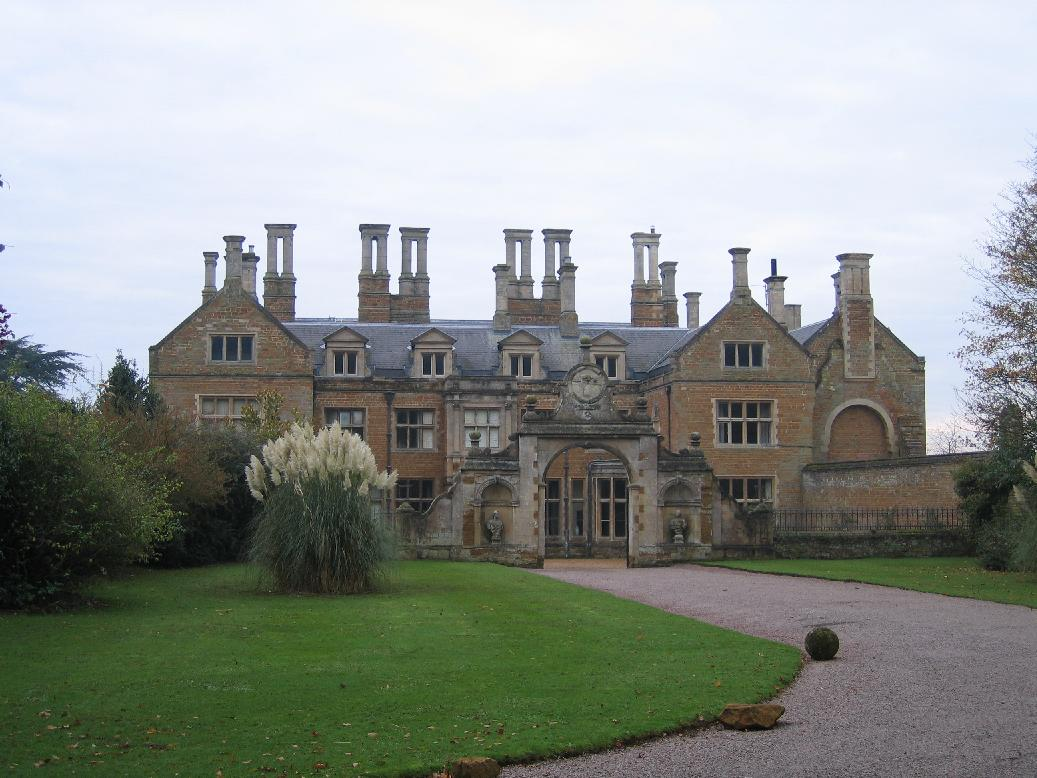
- Holdenby House
- Born: 1841; St Pancras, Middlesex, England
- Died: 1893 (aged 51–52) of St Pancras, London, Middlesex, England
- Occupation: Architect
- Known for: Gothic Revival architecture

Richard Herbert Carpenter (July 1841 – 18 April 1893) was an English Gothic Revival architect.

Carpenter was born 1841 in St Pancras, England, the son of the tractarian architect Richard Cromwell Carpenter and his wife Amelia.He is best known for his collaboration with Benjamin Ingelow; their architectural practice, founded by Carpenter's father and based in Marylebone, London, was responsible for the construction or of many ecclesiastical properties.

== Biography ==
Carpenter attended Charterhouse School and began his architectural career working with his late father's partner William Slater. Following Slater's death in 1872, Carpenter went into partnership with the chief assistant in the practice, Benjamin Ingelow.

Carpenter worked as architect to Ardingly College following the school's purchase of a 196-acre (0.79 km^{2}) site at Ardingly in 1862. He was taken into partnership with Slater in 1863 and was admitted ARIBA on 15 June of that year, his proposers being Slater, Mair and the St Pancras surveyor Henry Baker. In partnership with William Slater he designed the Gothic buildings of Denstone College (1868–73) The school buildings, hall, chapel and war memorial are all listed Grade II. The school's chapel was added in 1879–87 by Carpenter and Ingelow in a late 13th-century Gothic style; it consists of a four bay nave with polygonal apse.

Also in 1868, Carpenter started work on the ambitious Gothic chapel – with an internal height of 94 feet (29 m) – at Lancing College in Sussex. Work continued long after Carpenter's death; the projected tower was never built; plans to complete the west end have since been resurrected and as at 2013 were at the fundraising stage. Designs for the existing school buildings had been begun by his father in 1848, although construction did not begin until 1854.

In 1872 Carpenter was responsible for the design of the pulpit at Jesus Church, Forty Hill, Enfield, Middlesex. This led to a commission in 1874 for a complete church at Enfield, St Michael and All Angels. built in ragstone in a fourteenth-century Gothic style, with a clerestory with double lancet windows. The altar in the chancel is recessed into polygonal vaulted apse in the Byzantine style with stone reredos depicting the Crucifixion. Carpenter's plans could not be carried out completely, due to lack of funds.

Carpenter is perhaps best remembered for his recreation of Holdenby House. This large country house in Northamptonshire had originally been built in the sixteenth century by Sir Christopher Hatton, Lord Chancellor to Queen Elizabeth I; one of the largest and grandest houses in England, it had been subsequently sold to James I and became a royal palace. Following the Civil War it had been mostly demolished. In 1873 Carpenter was employed by the owner Viscountess Clifden to recreate the Elizabethan house incorporating the little that remained of it. Although Carpenter's house was only an eighth the size of the former palace, the completed Elizabethan-style mansion was an architectural success. The many gabled stone new house, with tall ornamental chimneys and mullioned windows was approached through the original tripartite arches of the former palace. In 1887 Carpenter returned to Holdenby to design the great panelled entrance hall. It is at Holdenby, away from the ecclesiastical Gothic, that Carpenter's versatility of style as an architect can truly be seen.

By 1875 Carpenter was again working in Northamptonshire, this time working in a thirteenth-century design for the new chancel at the church of St Margaret Luddington-in-the-Brook. A large project in 1877 was the full scale restoration of the church of St Mary the Virgin at Goudhurst, Kent. This included the building of a vestry and a large part of the south aisle. Carpenter, working in 1865 with William Slater, who had been in partnership with his father, had prepared the plans for an earlier restoration of this church.

In 1879 Carpenter and Ingelow received the commission to create the topographical crown of Nathaniel Woodard's schools – Ellesmere College with its "H" plan and gothic facade looking out over a quadrangle, terraces and playing fields towards the hills of Wales.

In 1884 Carpenter and Ingelow received an important commission to design what is today known as the Chapel Court at Jesus College, Cambridge. Working with red brick, the court with a central castellated tower blends harmoniously with its surroundings.

In 1888 the partnership unsuccessfully entered the competition to design Cathedral of St. John the Divine in New York City; the eventual winners were the New York firm of Heins & LaFarge.

The church of St Mary and All Saints, Willingham, was one of the last restorations by the partnership, completed in 1891. Carpenter died in 1893 aged 52.
