= St Mary's Church, Goudhurst =

Parish church in the village of Goudhurst, Kent, England

Coordinates: 51.11366°N 0.46156°E

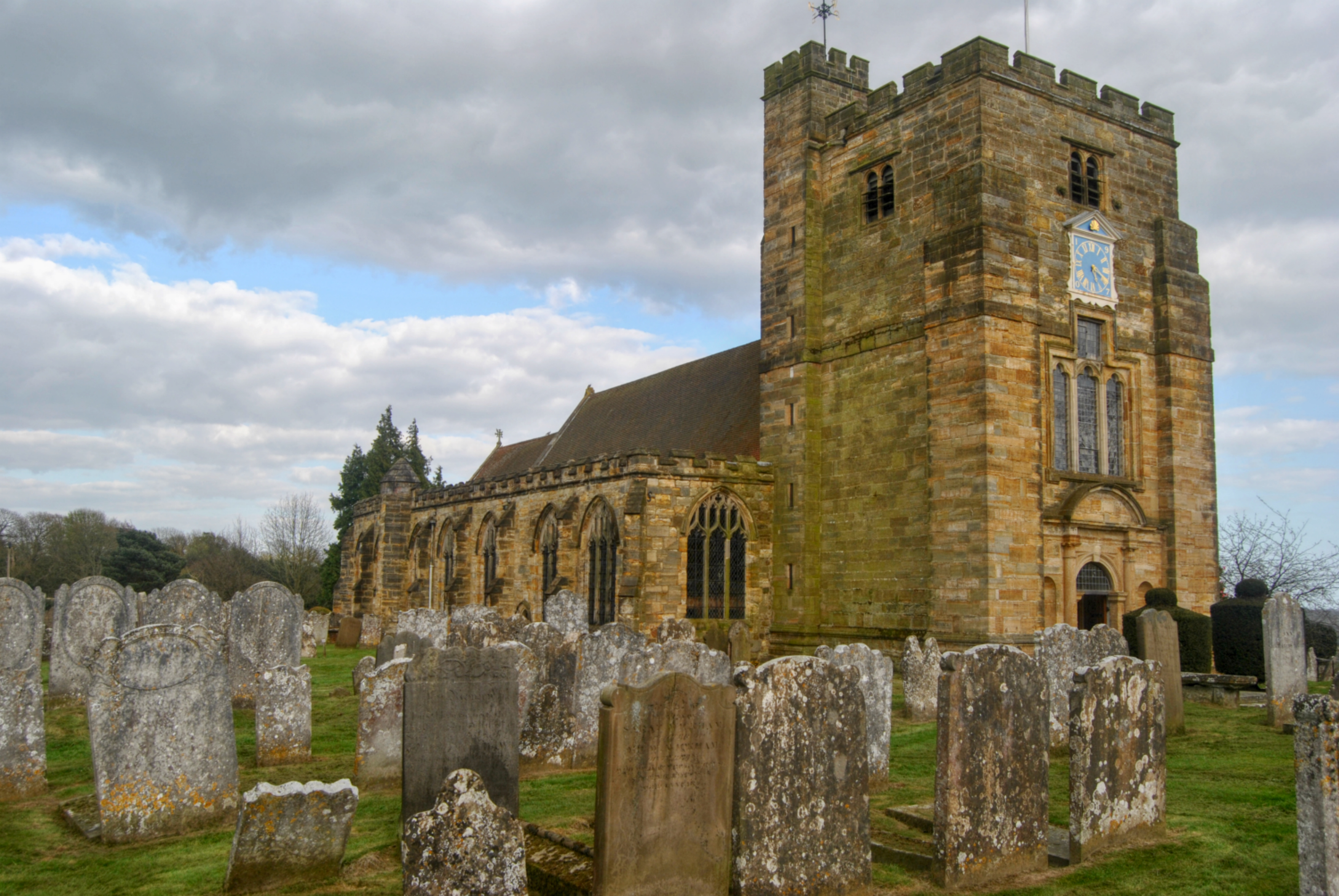

- Location within Kent
- OS grid reference: TQ 72394 37810
- Location: Goudhurst, Kent
- Country: England
- Denomination: Anglican
- Website: gkchurch.org.uk

History
- Status: Parish church

Architecture
- Functional status: Active
- Heritage designation: Grade I
- Designated: 20 June 1967
- Completed: Pre-1119

Administration
- Province: Canterbury
- Diocese: Canterbury
- Archdeaconry: Maidstone
- Deanery: Weald
- Parish: Goudhurst

St Mary's Church is a parish church in Goudhurst, Kent, England. It is a Grade I listed building.

== Building ==
The church stands on a hill and its tower commands impressive views of the surrounding countryside. For this reason it was a major surveying point in the Anglo-French Survey (1784–1790) to measure the precise distance and relationship between the Paris Observatory and the Royal Greenwich Observatory, supervised by General William Roy.

A large 13th-century sandstone church with aisles to the naves and side chapels in the chancel, the church has been altered and restored many times over the centuries. The 115 feet tall spire and the tower were destroyed by lightning on 23 August 1637, melting all five bells held within. In 1638 three London masons Edmund Kinsman, James Holman and John Young rebuilt the west tower in a truncated Classical/Gothic style. The clock face is early 20th-century. The tower now contains a ring of eight bells.

Inside there is simple arched piscina and a hollow chamfered ambry in the largely 19th-century chancel (built based on excavations made during the Victorian restoration) which has a fine 19th-century altar rail with iron-twist uprights to the Sanctuary. Attached to the tower and the vestry is a spear-head railed enclosed area for footstones to the Bathurst family. The nave is of five-bay arcades while the rood screens to the North and South chapels incorporate 14th or 15th-century panelling with the upper section of the screen to the South chapel carved as a memorial to the First World War. The pulpit with its brass candlesticks and book rest stands on an octagonal stone base and steps with iron and brass rails. The body of the pulpit is 13th-century with figures of the apostles and evangelical symbols carved in relief. The brass lectern is 19th-century while the font in the nave has a 19th-century bowl with evangelical symbols and stands on a medieval (probably 15th-century) base. Another medieval bowl is located in the north aisle decorated with arcading and crosses.

From 1865 to 1870 the church was restored by the architects William Slater and Richard Carpenter, the alterations being supervised by Ewan Christian. A further restoration by Carpenter alone in 1877 included the building of a vestry and a large part of the South aisle. The church contains a remarkable painted wood and gesso effigy to Sir Alexander Culpeper and his wife Constance.

== History ==
The first mention of a church at Goudhurst is in 1119 when Robert de Crevecoeur gave his church at Goudhurst to Leeds Priory at Leeds in Kent. This St Mary's church would have been a small building probably covering the site of the present South chapel and part of the South aisle. At this time the monks at Combwell Priory acted as chaplains. It was not until about 1300 that one of them signed himself Peter – the Vicar.

=== Bells ===
The lightning strike in 1637 destroyed the five bells previously hung in the tower. The rebuilt tower featured only a single bell from 1640, which was augmented to a three bell ring by 1690. By 1775, eight bells hung in the tower, with several earlier bells being recast for better tuning, preserving the names of the original donors. The ring as it is today was finished by 1834, when the tenor was recast. On 2 June 1858, nine men broke into the belfry at 4 o'clock in the morning and began ringing the bells in a "noisy, turbulent and disorderly manner". Complaints were made against all nine men to a Justice of the peace, and they were ordered to appear before the Justices in Cranbrook.

=== Battle of Goudhurst ===
In 1747 a full-scale battle took place in the church and churchyard between the Goudhurst Militia under 'General' William Sturt, a former army corporal, and the Hawkhurst Gang, a large and notorious 18th-century smuggling group led by Thomas Kingsmill, a native of the village. When he heard that the Militia had been formed Kingsmill became enraged by this act of defiance and threatened to burn the village and kill the residents unless the Militia was disbanded and Sturt handed over to the smugglers, setting an appointed time, 21 April 1747. These demands not being met, when the gang attacked on the appointed day they approached heavily armed with many stripped to the waist to display their scars and tattoos in an act of bravado and intimidation. However, the Militia were well enough trained to shoot dead Kingsmill's brother George in the first volley of a battle fought around St. Mary's church. Two more smugglers died during the battle. William Sturt spent his last years as Warden of Goudhurst Workhouse, while Kingsmill was hanged at Tyburn in 1749.

The body of Thomas Kingsmill was delivered to the High Sheriff of Kent in order that it could be hung up in chains at Goudhurst.

== Burials and memorials ==
In the north chapel are monuments to Edmond Roberts (died 1627), Richard Pack (died 1838) and Edward Lewis Miller (1831–1846), who died in a fall from a cliff on the Isle of Wight. He is also commemorated on a Grade II listed obelisk at Afton Down on the Isle of Wight. In the chancel are memorials to William (d.1615) and Rachel (d.1606) Campion consisting of a large hanging monument with allegorised female figures resting on a pediment with the entire monument flanked by obelisks on pedestals. William and Rachel are depicted kneeling facing each other with a prayer desk while figures of their five sons and four daughters are carved on the obelisk pedestals.

In the south chapel can be found memorial brasses to John Bedgebury (died 1424); Sir John Culpepper (1424–1480), and Walter and Agnes Culpepper (died 1462 and 1457). Here also is the alabaster standing wall monument to 'Young' Sir Alexander Culpepper (1541–1599), erected in 1608 by his son Sir Anthony Culpepper. The base represents Sir Alexander's 16 grandchildren – eleven boys and five girls. Visible at the top is the half figure of Sir Thomas Culpepper, depicted as an old armoured man holding a skull, while within the frame below Sir Alexander is depicted kneeling to the right with his son Sir Anthony behind, and Lady Mary opposite.

In the south aisle located in its own bay window is the important monument to 'Old' Sir Alexander Culpepper (died 1537), which is in the form of a lozenge-panelled chest with recumbent wooden effigies set with coloured gesso detail and is one of only eighty or so of its kind in the country. His head rests on his knight's helmet. In the reveal of one bay are relief panels depicting God in Majesty; the Virgin and Child, and St George and the Dragon with the date 1537 on the carved depiction in one bay of a prayer desk with a knight, a lady and children at prayer.

A black marble wall tablet with the head of a cherub is dedicated to Anthony Fowle of Twyssenden (died 1679). The Bathurst monuments consist of plain white and black tablets while that to John Bathurst (died 1697) is known as the 'Bread Tomb' because the 'dole' of bread was laid out on it for distribution to the poor of the parish. The grey marble tablet is to Edward Bathurst (died 1772). Also in the south chapel can be found a large plain white marble tablet with a half-bust turned to the left of a periwinkled William Campion (1640–1702). In the south west window are fragments of 15th-century glass.

== Gallery ==
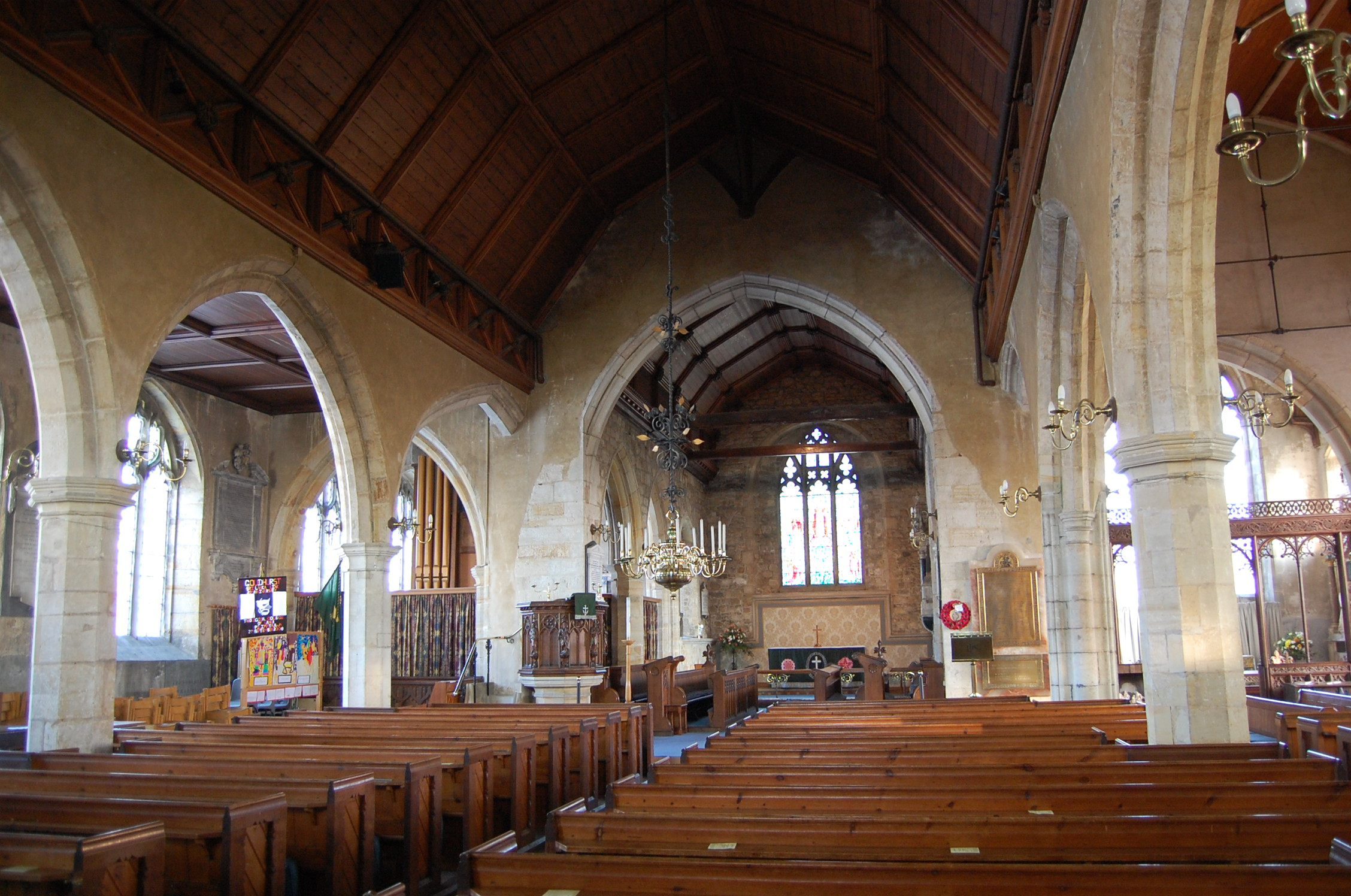
View down the nave towards the east

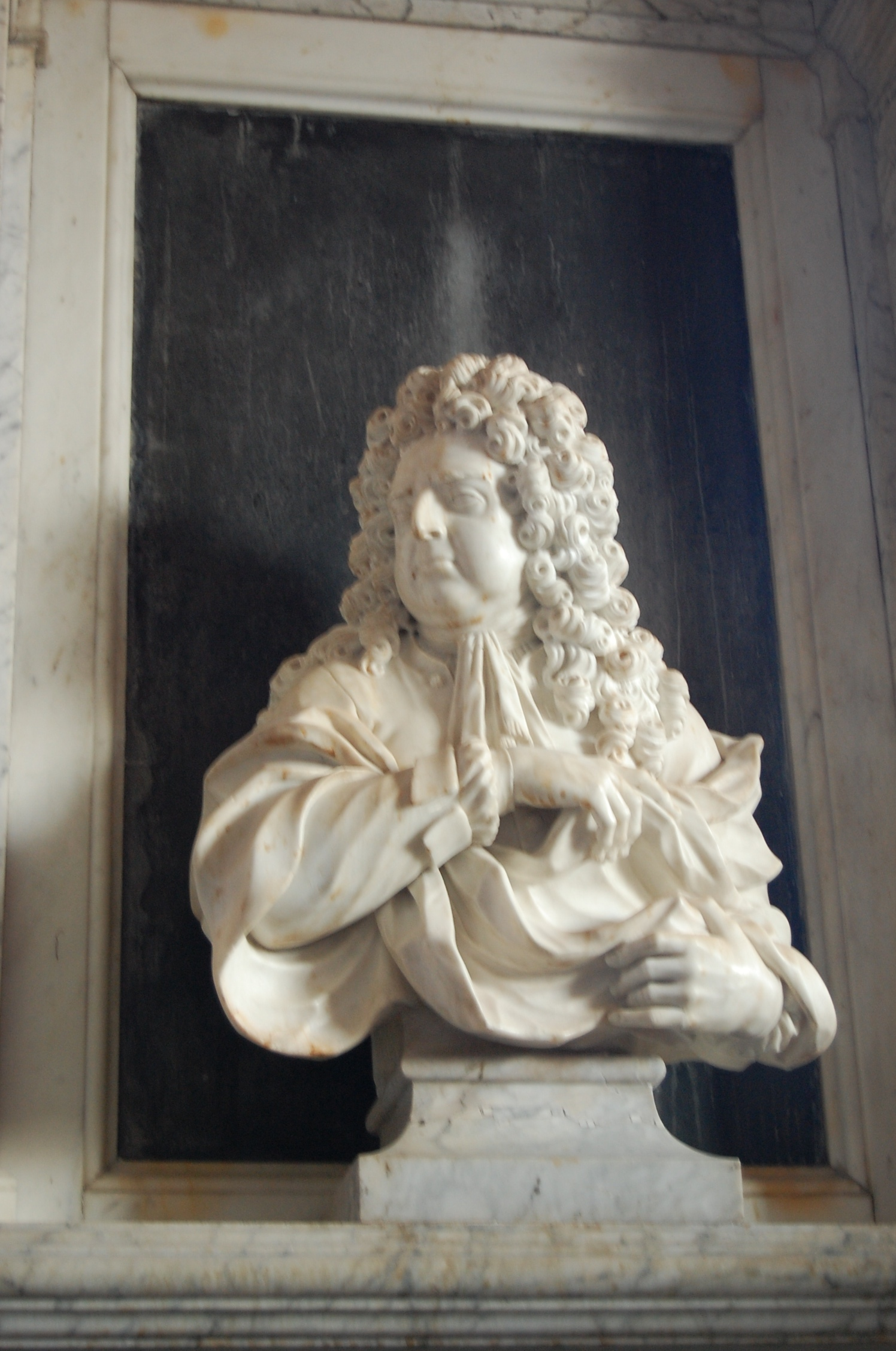
The bust on the monument of politician William Campion (1640–1702)

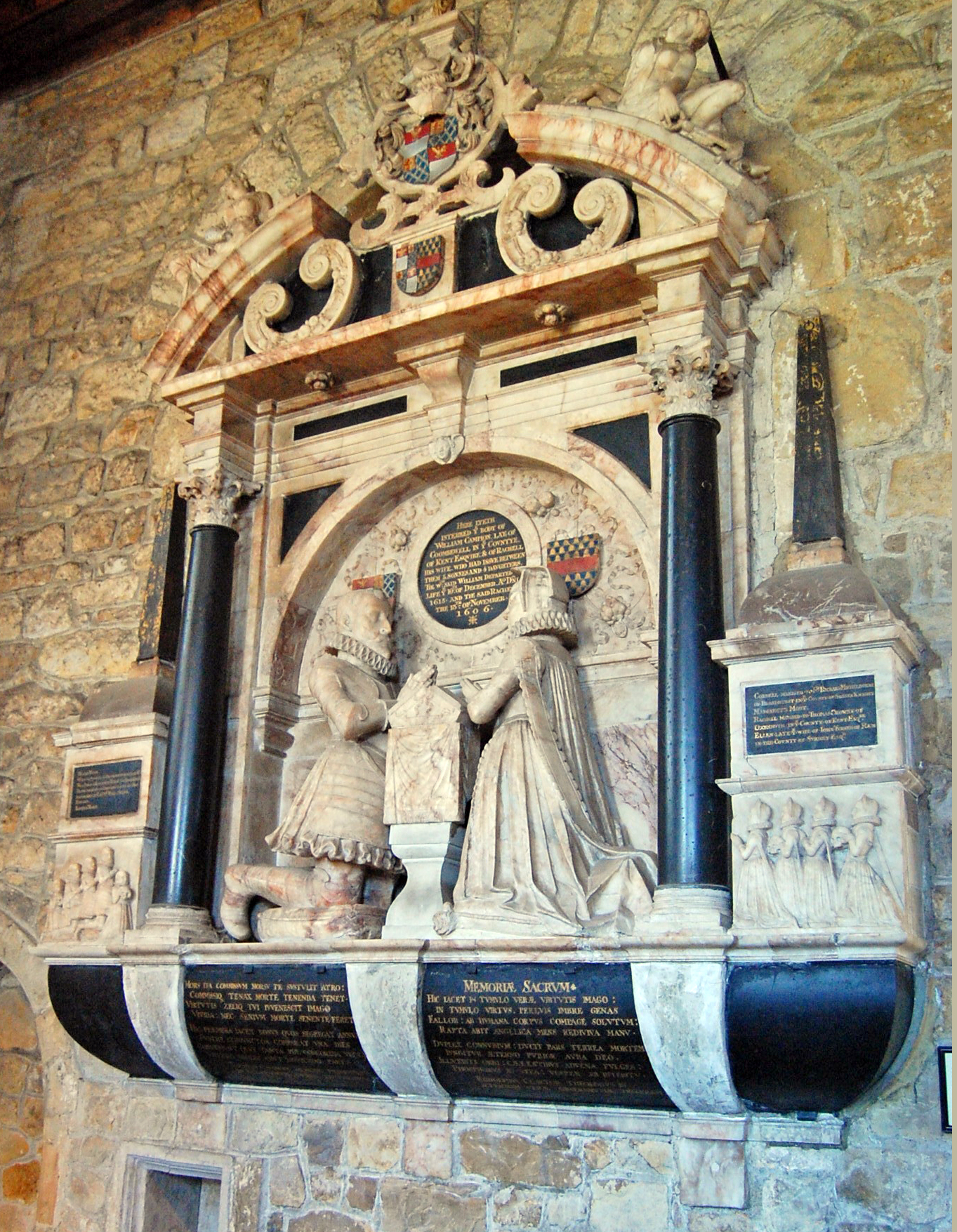
Memorial to William and Rachel Campion

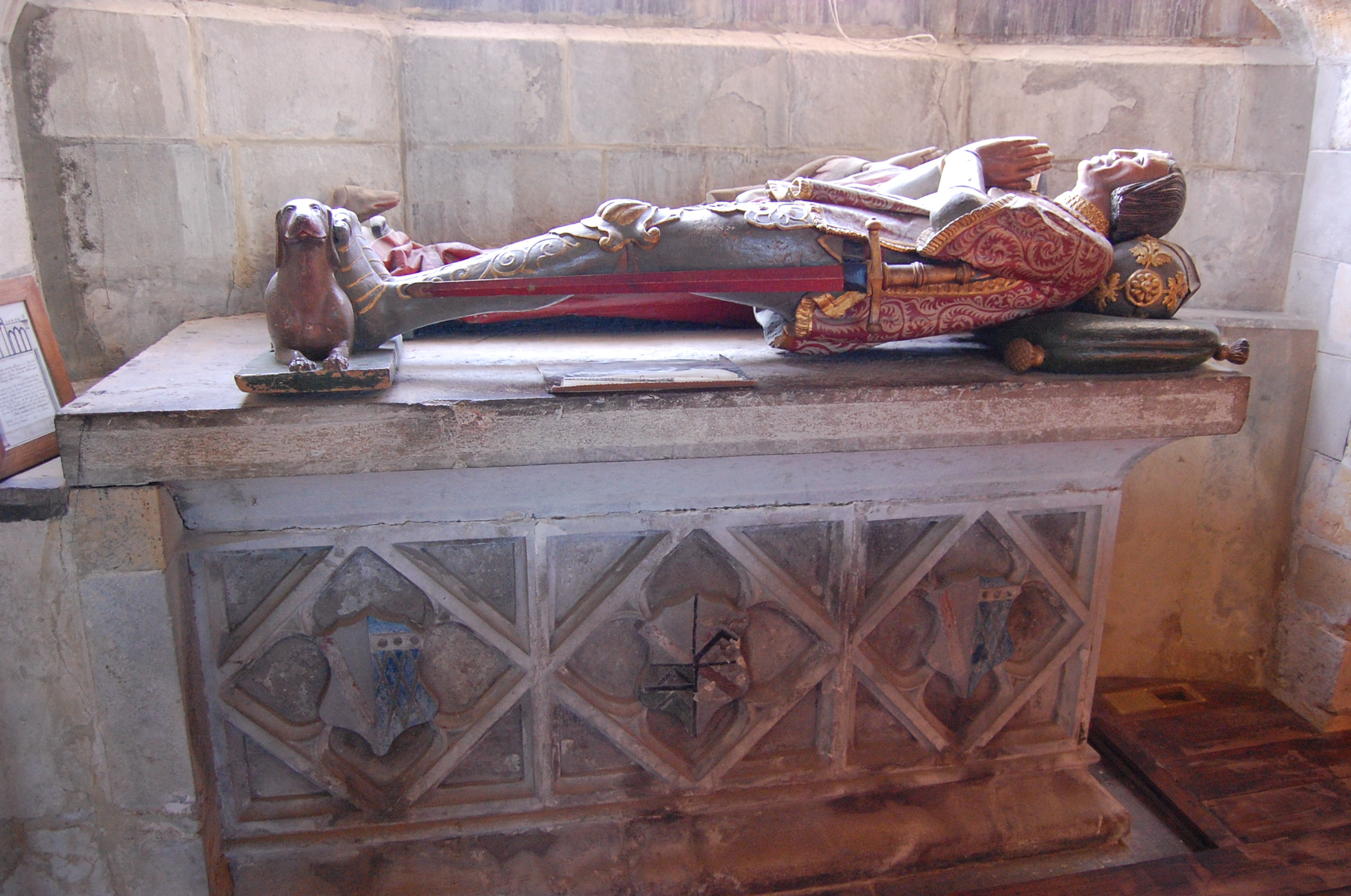
Wooden carved and painted gesso monument to 'Old' Sir Alexander Culpepper (died 1537)

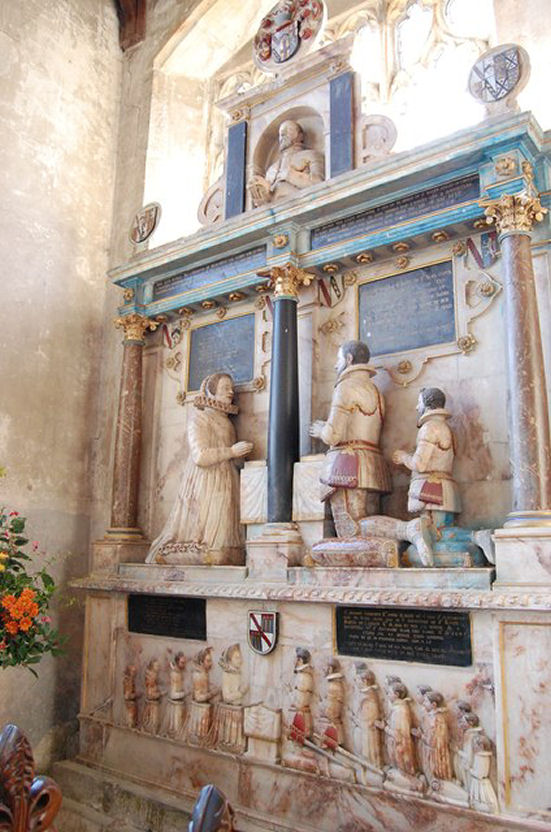
The tomb of 'Young' Sir Alexander Culpepper (died 1599) with his 16 grandchildren

== See also ==
- Goudhurst
