= William Slater (architect) =

English architect (1819–1872)

William Slater (1819 – 17 December 1872) was an English architect who was born in Northamptonshire and practised in London. He oversaw restoration of many churches, latterly in partnership with R. H. Carpenter.

== Career ==
He joined Richard Cromwell Carpenter as his first pupil. For some years lived with the Carpenter family, and he became Carpenter's assistant. Slater left to establish an independent practice with another of Carpenter's pupils, William Smith (later Bassett-Smith). Carpenter died in 1855 at the age of 42, and Slater was persuaded to take over his practice. In 1857 Carpenter's son Richard Herbert Carpenter joined him as a pupil, and became a partner in 1863.

== Work ==
Slater and Smith designed a parsonage and restored three churches. He is reported by Antram & Pevsner to have restored the chancel of St Mary, Ticehurst circa 1850 and the remainder of the church in 1855-57. He was responsible for substantially rebuilding St Bartholomew, Burwash in 1855/56.

the firm of Carpenter & Slater was responsible for the Bishop's Throne in Chichester Cathedral and after Carpenter's death Slater completed the restoration of the Cathedral {sfn Pevsner and Nairn: Sussex}

When R. C. Carpenter died he left uncompleted the rebuilding of the parish church of SS Simon and Jude, Earl Shilton, Leicestershire. Slater took over the work and completed it in 1856.

Slater was responsible for the restoration of the parish church at Etchingham, The Assumption of the Blessed Mary and St Nicholas, and was asked by the new Rector, the Reverend Robert Barton, to design the new school, which was built in 1864 {sfn PRO Ed21/17220}. He contributed an article about the church to the Sussex Archaeological Society collection.

In 1863 Slater and an architect called Gillet directed the restoration of the parish church of SS Peter and Paul, Scaldwell, Northamptonshire.

In 1867 he designed and built the Church of St Philip, Burwash Common, which Pevsner describes as "a serious job" {Pevsner: Sussex p.464}

=== Solo works ===
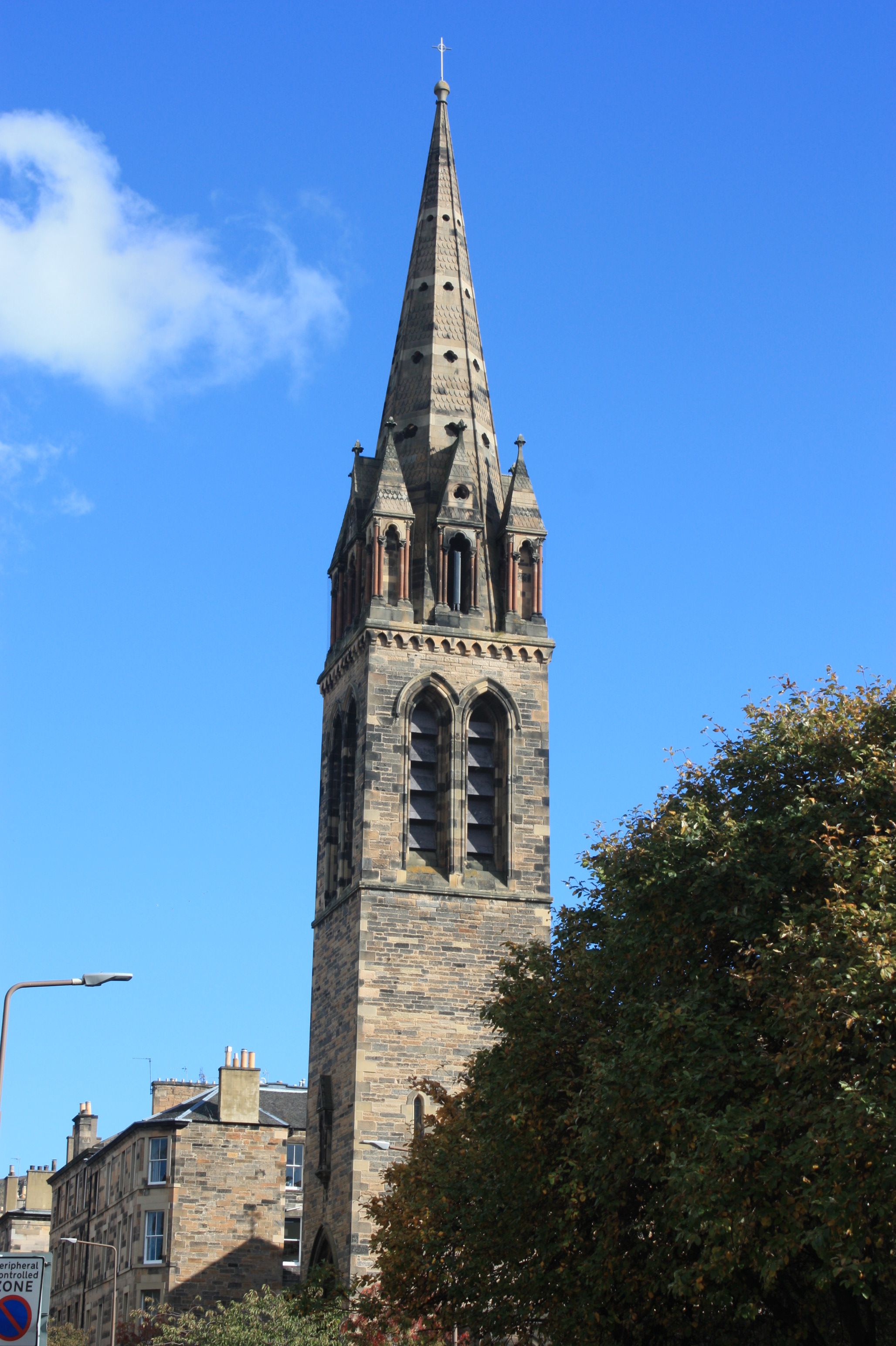
Steeple of St Peter's Episcopal Church, Lutton Place, Edinburgh, Scotland, designed by William Slater and built in 1857

- Loughborough Town Hall, Leicestershire, 1855.
- Restoration of St Mary's Church, Higham Ferrers, Northamptonshire, about 1857.
- North aisle and northwest tower of St Mary's church, Stowting, Kent, 1857–68.
- Restoration of St Mary's church, Finedon, Northamptonshire, 1858.
- Chancel of St Faith's church, Newton-in-the-Willows, Northamptonshire, 1858.
- Restoration of St Michael's church, Haselbech, Northamptonshire, 1859–60.
- Addition of battlements and spire to the tower of All Saints' church, Naseby, Northamptonshire, 1859–60.
- Restoration of the parish church of SS Peter and Paul, Easton Maudit, Northamptonshire, 1859–61.
- New pulpit for St Dionysius' Church, Market Harborough, Leicestershire, carved by J Forsyth in 1860 but removed in 1975.
- Restoration of St Wilfrid's church, Kibworth Beauchamp, Leicestershire, 1860–64.
- Restoration of St Peter's Church, Chetnole, Dorset, 1860–65.
- Rebuilding of the chancel arch in All Saints' church, Thurlaston, Leicestershire, 1861.
- Restoration of St Mary's church, Stapleford, Wiltshire, 1861.
- Plans for Church of England School at Etchingham, 1961, built 1864 {sfn PRO ED21/17220}
- Restoration of the Anglo-Saxon St Mary's Priory Church, Deerhurst, Gloucestershire, 1861–63.
- Restoration of St John the Baptist, Thorpe Achurch, Northamptonshire, 1861–63.
- Restoration of St John the Baptist, Kingsthorpe, Northamptonshire, 1863.
- East window of St Peter's church, Wymondham, Leicestershire, inserted in 1864.
- Restoration of St Mary's church, Burton Latimer, Northamptonshire, and rebuilding of tower, 1866.
- Restoration and extension of St Johns' House, Sherborne, c.1866.
- New Church of St Peter, Burwash Common {sfn Pevsner: Sussex p.464}
- Window tracery for St Peter's church, Aldwinkle, Northamptonshire (date unknown).
- Restoration of St Michael's church, Great Oakley, Northamptonshire (date unknown).
- Restoration of SS Peter and Paul, Kettering, Northamptonshire (date unknown).
- Restoration of St Botolph's church, Stoke Albany, Northamptonshire (date unknown).
- Restoration of the nave of St Mary's church, Woodford, Northamptonshire (date unknown).

=== With R. H. Carpenter ===
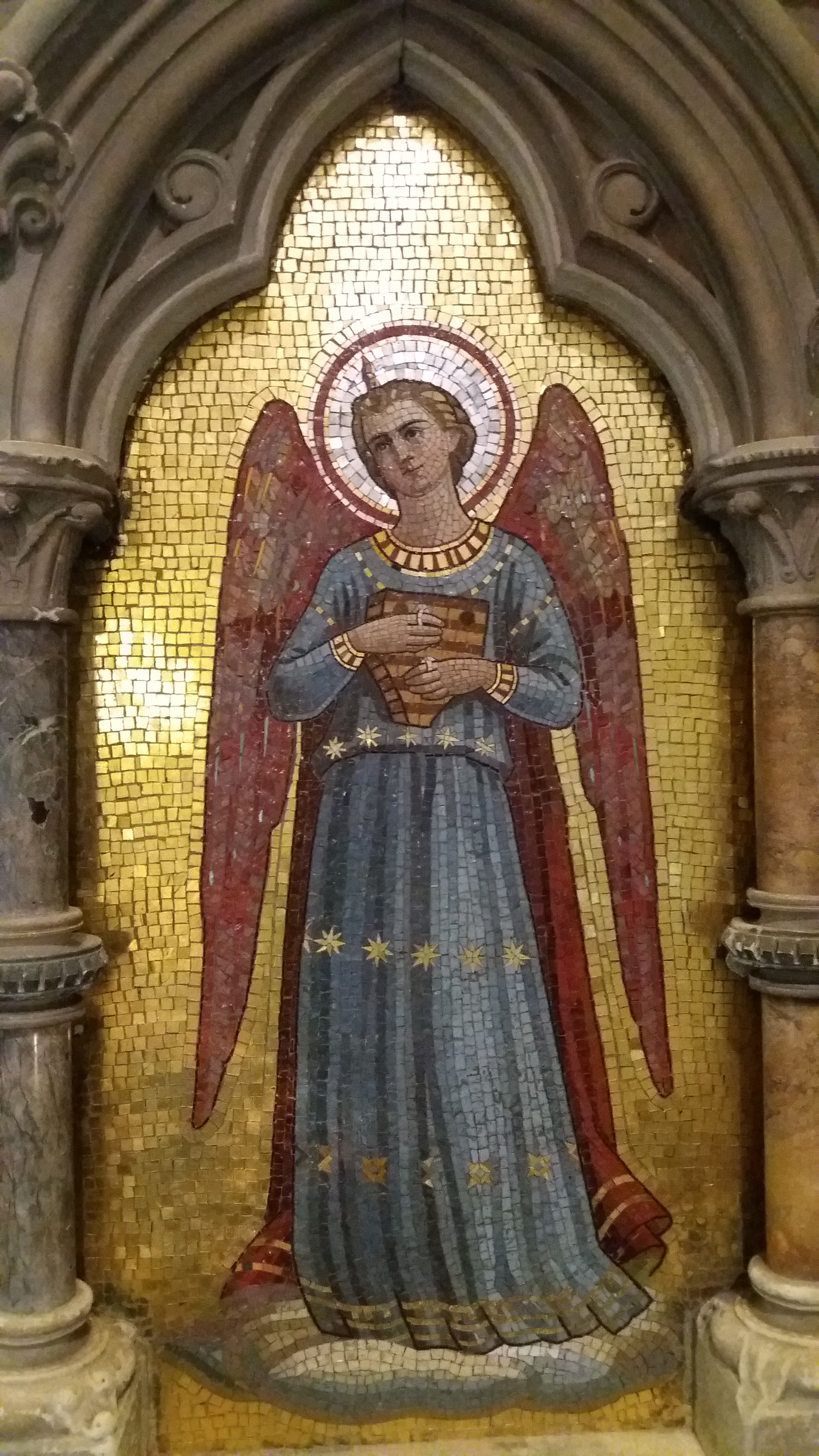
A panel of the reredos designed by Slater and made in 1860 for St Michael's, Sittingbourne, Kent

- Restoration of the church of St Michael the Archangel, Sittingbourne, Kent, 1859–73. Slater designed the reredos, which was made in 1860.
- Rebuilding of the chancel of St Mary's church, Edith Weston, Rutland, and a south chapel and organ loft, 1865.
- Restoration of St Mary's church in Goudhurst, Kent, 1865 to 1870.
- Restoration of St Peter's church, Little Oakley, Northamptonshire, 1867.
- Restoration of All Saints' church, Pitsford, Leicestershire, 1867.
- Chapel of Cheam School in Surrey, built 1867–68. Now part of the Roman Catholic church of St Christopher.
- Restoration of Market Harborough Grammar School, Leicestershire, 1868.
- Main building of Denstone College, Staffordshire, 1868–73. $
- Restoration of St Nicholas' church, Bulwick, Northamptonshire, 1870.
- Tracery for the east window of St Andrew's church, Cransley, Northamptonshire, 1870.
- Rebuilding of St Luke's church, Thurnby, Leicestershire, 1870–73.
- Restoration of St Peter's church, Alvescot, Oxfordshire, 1870–72.
- Rebuilding of St Leonard's church, Tortworth, Gloucestershire, 1872.
- Holdenby House, Northamptonshire, 1873–75.

== Bibliography ==
- Brodie, Antonia; Felstead, Alison; Franklin, Jonathan; Pinfield, Leslie, eds. (2001). Directory of British Architects 1834–1914. Vol. L–Z. London & New York: Continuum. ISBN 082645514X.
- Cherry, Bridget; Pevsner, Nikolaus (1983). London 2: South. The Buildings of England. London: Penguin Books. p. 652. ISBN 0-14-071047-7.
- Elliott, John (2011). "RC Carpenter (1812–55): the Anglicans' Pugin". In Webster, Christopher (ed.). The Practice of Architecture: eight architects, 1830–1930. Spire Studies in Architectural History. Vol. 1. Reading: Spire Books. pp. 156–157. ISBN 978-1-904965-34-3.
- Newman, John (1969). North East and East Kent. The Buildings of England. Harmondsworth: Penguin Books. pp. 444, 445, 453. ISBN 0-14-071039-6.
- Pevsner, Nikolaus; Cherry, Bridget (revision) (1973) [1961]. Northamptonshire. The Buildings of England (2nd ed.). Harmondsworth: Penguin Books. pp. 76n, 130, 131n, 168n, 199, 217n, 235n, 245n, 251, 256, 272n, 295, 309, 313, 340n, 374, 402, 415n, 427, 466n, 530. ISBN 0-14-071022-1.
- Pevsner, Nikolaus; Williamson, Elizabeth; Brandwood, Geoffrey (1984) [1960]. Leicestershire and Rutland. The Buildings of England. Harmondsworth: Penguin Books. pp. 39, 147, 188, 291, 307n, 309, 409, 410, 431, 464. ISBN 0-14-071018-3.
- Sherwood, Jennifer; Pevsner, Nikolaus (1974). Oxfordshire. The Buildings of England. Harmondsworth: Penguin Books. p. 421. ISBN 0-14-071045-0.
- Verey, David (1970). Gloucestershire: The Vale and the Forest of Dean. The Buildings of England. Vol. 2. Harmondsworth: Penguin Books. pp. 168, 169, 389.
