= Hawkhurst Gang =

18th-century English criminal organisation

The Hawkhurst Gang was a notorious criminal organisation involved in smuggling throughout south-east England from 1735 until 1749. One of the more infamous gangs of the early 18th century, they extended their influence from Hawkhurst, their base in Kent, along the South coast, where they successfully raided the Custom House, Poole. After they were defeated in a battle with the Goudhurst militia in 1747, two of their leaders, Arthur Gray and Thomas Kingsmill, were executed in 1748 and 1749, respectively.

== Early years ==
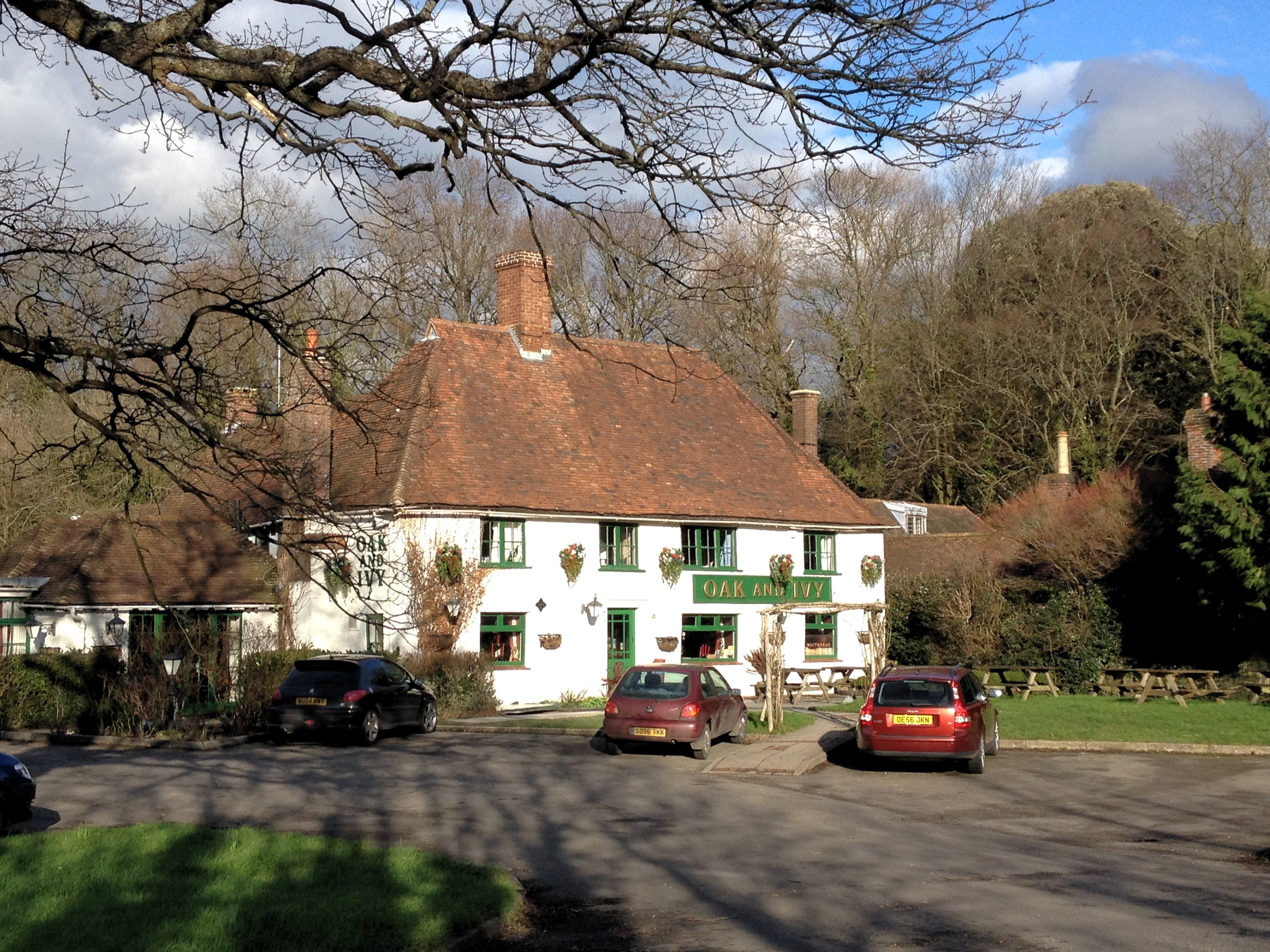
The Oak and Ivy Inn, Hawkhurst

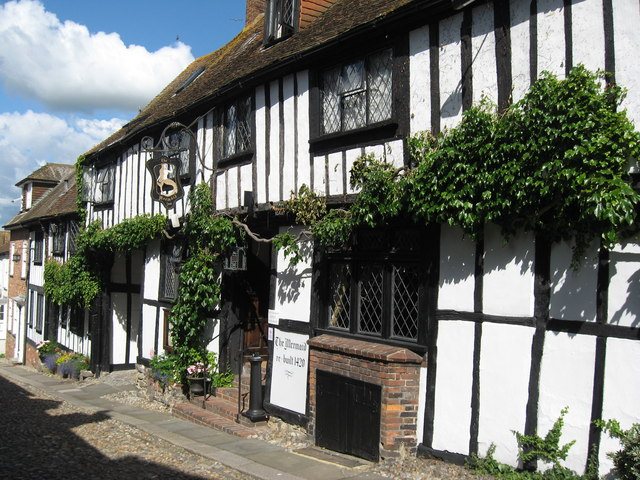
The Mermaid Inn, Rye

Named after the village of Hawkhurst, the gang was first mentioned as the Holkhourst Genge in 1735. The gang was based in the "Oak and Ivy Inn", Hawkhurst. A secondary headquarters was The Mermaid Inn in the town of Rye, where they would sit with their loaded weapons on the table. Many local legends and folklore are based on the alleged network of tunnels built by the gang. However, many hidden cellars and remote barns could have been used for storage so it is unlikely that tunnels would have been needed at that period when large armed gangs operated openly, often riding through the larger towns in daylight.

== Dominance through terror ==
In 1740, riding officer Thomas Carswell and a party of dragoons found about 15 cwt (750 kg) of smuggled tea in a barn at Etchingham and were taking it to Hastings in a cart. James Stanford of the Hawkhurst Gang rode round the area and collected about thirty men with horses and weapons. After drinking brandy to bolster their courage, they attacked the revenue party at Silver Hill between Hurst Green and Robertsbridge, shooting Carswell dead and capturing the soldiers. One of the smugglers, George Chapman, was later executed and gibbeted in his home village of Hurst Green.

On one occasion when the gang was drinking at the Mermaid Inn in Rye, some twenty of them visited the nearby Red Lion, firing their guns in the air. A young bystander, James Marshall, who took too keen an interest in them, was taken away and never seen again.

The gang generally operated freely in the area, as when in 1744 they unloaded a considerable amount of contraband from three large cutters at Pevensey, from which the smuggled goods were carried inland by around 500 pack horses.

Sometime in the early 1740s Jeremiah Curtis, who had been part of a violent gang in the Hastings area, joined forces with the Hawkhurst Gang, and was one of its most brutal members. It was Curtis who led the whipping and beating to death of Richard Hawkins, a farm labourer from Walberton whom they suspected of stealing two bags of the gang's tea. Hawkins was taken to the Dog and Partridge inn at Slindon to be interrogated. When he died of his injuries, his body was found weighted with rocks in a lake 12 miles (19 km) away at Parham Park in the spring of 1748. Parham Park was owned by Sir Cecil Bishopp, 6th Baronet.

== The Poole raid ==
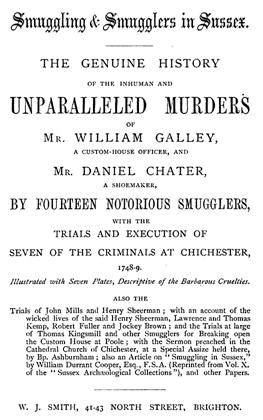
Title page of book, written at the time, about the murder of the two men.

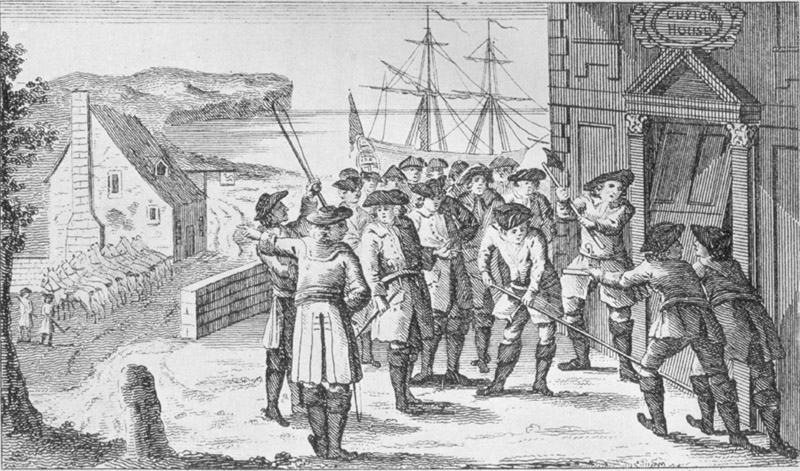
A Representation of members of the gang breaking open the King's Custom House at Poole.

In October 1747, members of the gang led a successful raid against a government Custom House in Poole in Dorset, which was holding about thirty hundredweight (3,360 lbs) of tea, thirty-nine casks of brandy and rum, and a small bag of coffee captured from the smugglers' ship Three-Brothers in September. The shipment from Guernsey, worth about £500 (equivalent to £97,636 in 2025), had been organised by the Hawkhurst Gang working with a group from east Hampshire and was intended to be landed at Christchurch Bay, but was captured by a revenue vessel Swift commanded by Captain William Johnson on 22 September 1747. The goods were then taken to Poole, after the crew had escaped in a small boat.

At a meeting in Charlton Forest Richard Perrin from Chichester, who had gone to Guernsey to buy the goods, made an agreement with the local men to recover the contraband. Thirty armed men, including Thomas Kingsmill, his lieutenant William Fairall, and about seven other Hawkhurst men, rode to Poole, stopping to rest in the New Forest. Arriving in Poole, at about 11 pm, they found that the customs house was under the guns of a naval sloop. The more local men were for abandoning the attempt, but the Hawkhurst men said they would continue alone, and it was then agreed that they would all continue. It was soon realised that as the tide fell the ship's guns would no longer be in sight of the customs house.

The gang broke into the customs house around 2 am on 8 October, escaping on horseback with the tea. They left the brandy, rum and coffee at the customs house, presumably due to insufficient transport. The smugglers were not opposed at any stage of the journey. The Customs Service offered a large reward of £500 for their capture.

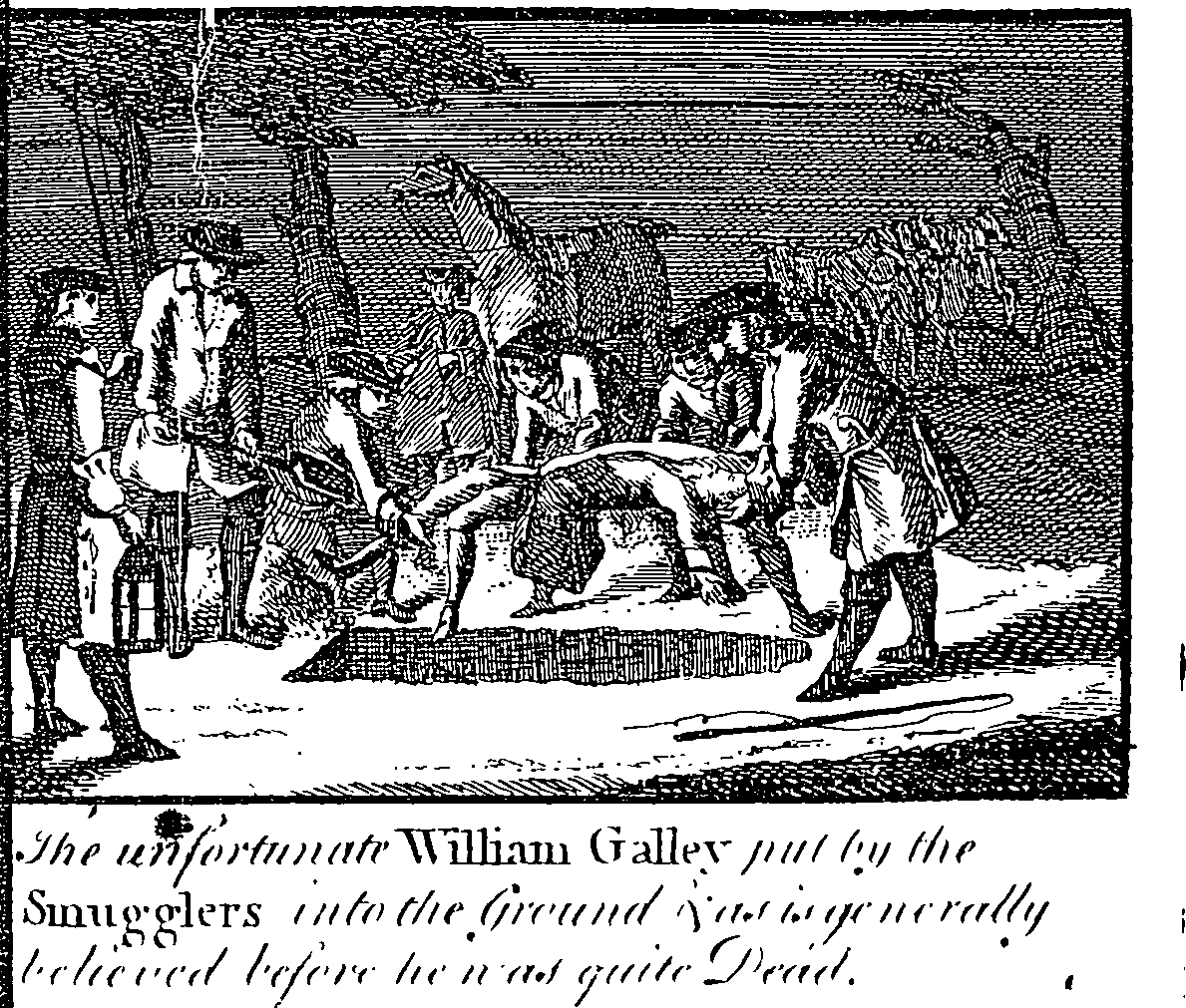
A full and genuine history of the inhuman and unparrallell'd murder of Mr. William Galley

Several months after the raid, a member of the gang known as Diamond (Note: John Diamond was also known as Dymar or Dimar) was captured and gaoled at Chichester. He had been recognised by a Fordingbridge resident, a shoemaker named Daniel Chater, who was given a small bag of tea by Diamond. Chater may not have intended to betray Diamond, but word of his knowledge got around. He was later called as a witness by the customs service, but he and an elderly revenue officer, William Galley, got lost while travelling to the remote downland village of East Marden to identify Diamond to a Justice of the Peace, Major Battine.

They stopped at the White Hart Inn at Rowlands Castle, a smugglers' pub, where the landlady fetched smugglers William Jackson and William Carter to investigate them. Galley received a blow to the face, which drew blood, and he and his witness were given drink until they fell asleep, whereupon the warrant to Galley was discovered. Both men were beaten and tied to a horse by local members of the gang, then taken north to the Red Lion Inn at Rake. During the journey they were severely whipped, to the point that they both rolled under the horse's belly with their lashed feet pointing upward and their heads colliding with the hooves. After burying the customs officer alive in a nearby fox earth the gang kept Chater chained in a turf shed at Trotton for several days before deciding to kill him. One of the gang, Tapner, used a knife to slash Chater across the eyes, nose, and forehead, before the gang took their captive to a well at Lady Holt Park. After a botched attempt at hanging him over the edge of the well, Chater was killed when the gang pushed him in and pelted his body with logs and stones. The corpses were not discovered until the authorities were tipped off in two anonymous letters.

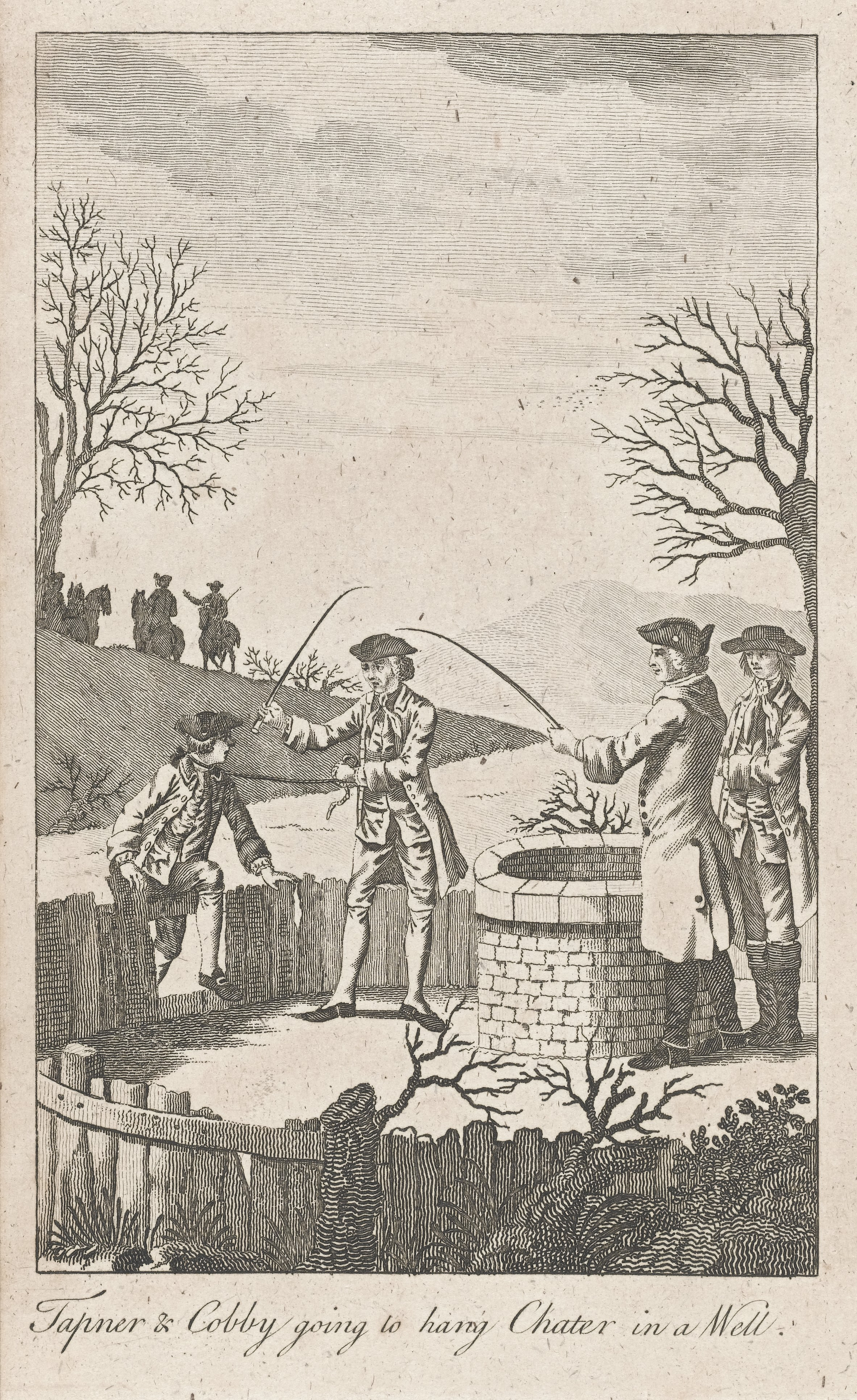
Hawkhurst gang members prepare to hang Chater down the well

== Downfall ==
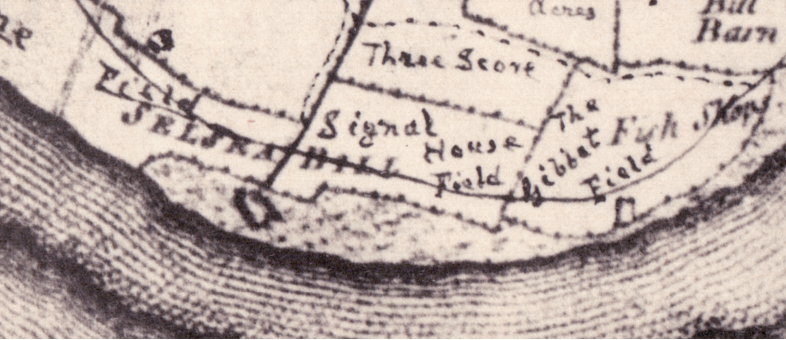
Part of 1778 map of Selsey Bill showing Gibbet Field (bottom right) where two of the murderers were believed to have been hung in chains.

Although smuggling gangs were generally supported by the local population as they provided much-needed and well-paid work, the murderous brutality of the gang had turned the residents against them. At Goudhurst, the people formed the Goudhurst Band Of Militia led by "General" William Sturt, a former army corporal. Enraged by this defiance, Thomas Kingsmill, a native of the town, threatened to burn the town and kill the residents, setting an appointed time, 21 April 1747. When the gang attacked on the appointed day, the militia were well enough trained to shoot dead Kingsmill's brother George in the first volley of the Battle of Goudhurst fought around the St. Mary's church. Two more smugglers died before the gang withdrew. The gang members were not only smugglers but robbers and extortionists. Arthur Gray was apprehended in 1748 and indicted on charges of felonious assembly with the intention of carrying away goods that customs duty had not been paid – in other words smuggling. He was executed at Tyburn on Wednesday 11 May 1748.

In 1748 the government issued a list of men wanted for murders, burglaries and robberies in Sussex as well as the Custom-house break-in at Poole. The list was published in The London Gazette along with a request for information leading to the arrest of the smugglers. Any informant was promised a royal pardon and as a further encouragement it offered a £50 reward for each smuggler who was captured.Eventually, Thomas Kingsmill, alias Staymaker; William Fairall, alias Shepherd; Richard Perin, alias Pain, alias Carpenter; Thomas Lillywhite; and Richard Glover were all indicted for being concerned, with others, in breaking into the King's Custom-house, at Poole, and stealing thirty hundred weight of tea, value £500 or more. Mary Owen, the illegitimate daughter of Sir Cecil Bishopp, 6th Baronet, was married to Thomas Lillywhite.

Sir Cecil wrote two letters to the Lord Justice in an appeal for clemency, on behalf of Thomas Lillywhite. The Lord Justice, wrote back admonishing Sir Cecil for his views.

Thomas Lillywhite's defence was that he looked after the horses while the Poole raid was taking place, he was not aware of what was happening at the time, also he was not armed. Sir Cecil Bishopp provided one of his character references. Thomas Lillywhite was acquitted.

Kingsmill, Fairall and Perrin were found guilty and sentenced to death. Richard Glover was found guilty, but recommended for mercy by the Jury and became the only member of the gang to be pardoned. Jeremiah Curtis escaped before he could be brought to justice. He went to northern France, joining the Irish Brigade in Gravelines.

Kingsmill, Fairall and Perrin were executed at Tyburn on 26 April 1749. The bodies of Thomas Kingsmill and William Fairall were delivered to the Sheriff of Kent in order that they could be hung up in chains, the former at Goudhurst, the latter at Horsendown Green, where he once lived.

Seven of the gang were tried at Chichester assizes (Note: As the brutal murders had been committed close to Chichester the Duke of Richmond, (whose family seat was in the area) had petitioned for the Assizes to be held at Chichester.) and sentenced to hang. One of their number died in gaol before sentence could be carried out. The rest were hanged north of Chichester on the Broyle. (Note: The Broyle to the north of Chichester was formerly an enclosed area of woodland. It was stocked with deer or other beasts of the chase.) The principal murderers' bodies were then hung in chains, one on the Portsmouth Road near Rake, two on Selsey Bill, one near Chichester at Rook's Hill and one at Horsmonden in Kent.

With the cruel deaths of Galley and Chater, among others, causing national outrage, the names of known smugglers were published in the London Gazette. Any smuggler so listed was instructed to hand themselves in within 40 days of the publication date.

In all, at least 75 of the gang were hanged or transported. In addition, 14 of the gang had their bodies hung in chains (gibbeted). Gibbeting was usually reserved for murderers and occasionally mail robbers; so was an unusual punishment for smugglers, but reflected how seriously the authorities took the actions of the Hawkhurst Gang.

== Legacy ==
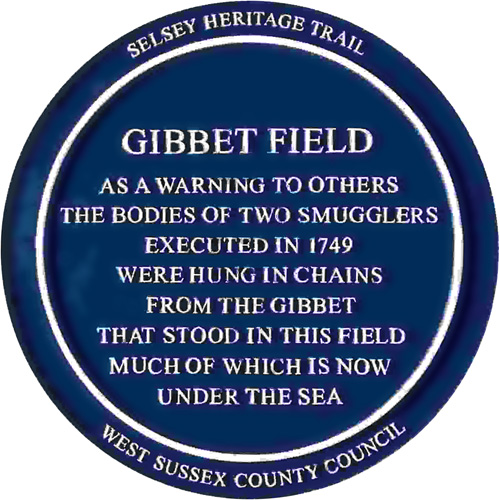
Blue plaque commemorating the hanging of two smugglers on Gibbet Field, Selsey in 1749

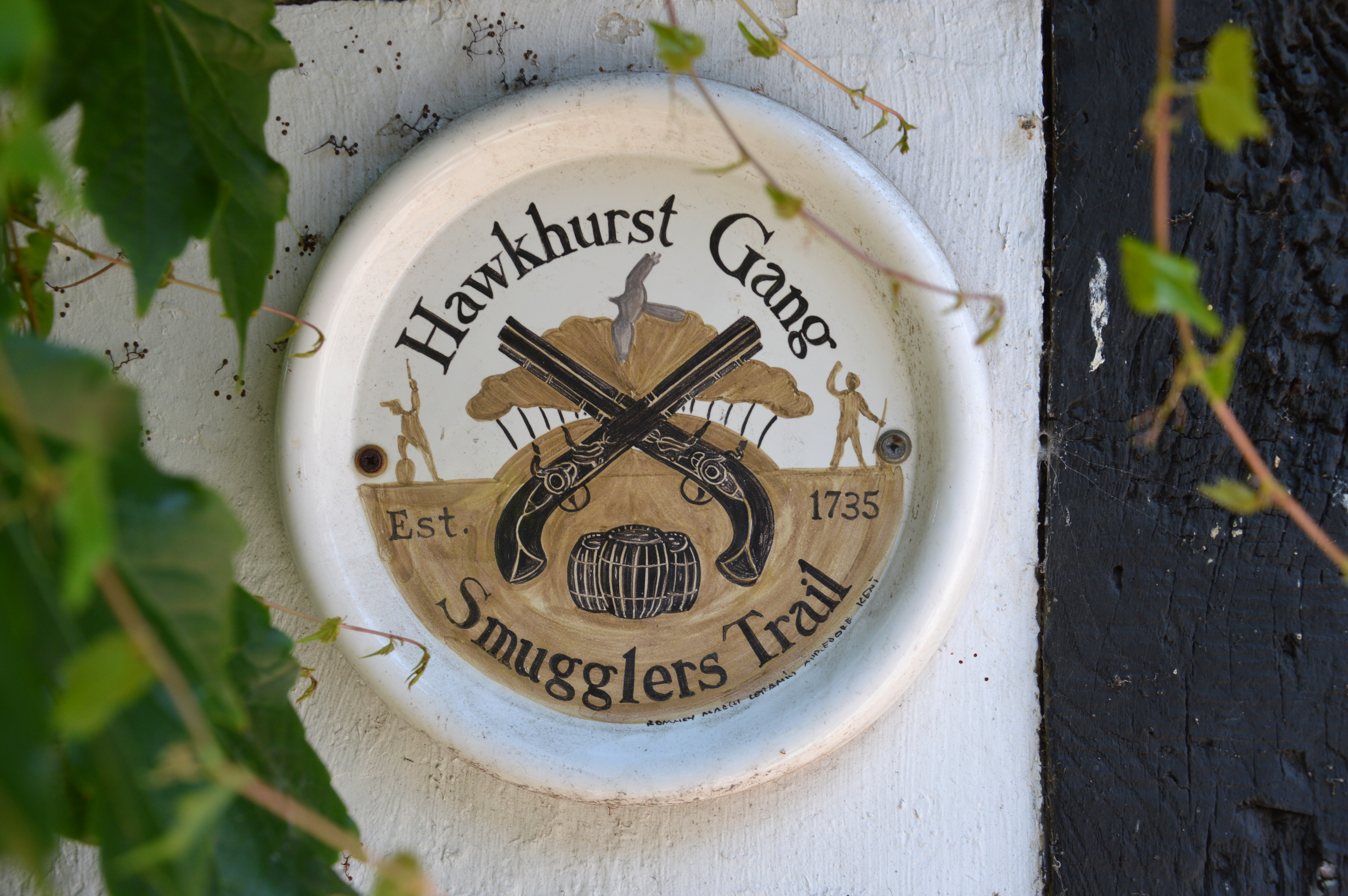
Plaque indicating the Hawkhurst Gang Smugglers Trail in Rye, East Sussex

In Kent and Sussex there are numerous 'memorials' and plaques commemorating those gang members executed and gibbeted in 1749.

On Broyle Road, in Chichester, there is a weather-beaten stone, known as the Smugglers' Stone, that was erected in 1749 to record the place of execution of six smugglers and the burial place of one of the convicted smugglers who died before his execution could be carried out. The inscription reads:

Near this place was buried the body of William Jackson, a prescribed smuggler, who upon a special commission of oyer and terminer held at Chichester on the 16th day of January 1748-9 was, with William Carter, attained for the murder of William Galley, a custom house officer and who likewise was together with Benjamin Tapner, John Cobby, John Hammond, Richard Mills the elder and Richard Mills the younger, his son, attained for the murder of Daniel Chater. But dying in a few hours after sentence of death was pronounced upon him he thereby escaped the punishment which the heinousness of his complicated crimes deserved and which was the next day most justly inflicted upon his accomplices. As a memorial to posterity and a warning to this and succeeding generations this stone is erected AD 1749.

— West Sussex info. 2019

According to the author Alex Preston, a street named Dumb Woman's Lane, located near Winchelsea, owes its name to the smugglers removing the tongue of a local woman after she informed on them to the government authorities in the 1740s.
