= Goudhurst =

Village and civil parish in the borough of Tunbridge Wells in Kent, England

Coordinates: 51.1112°N 0.4636°E

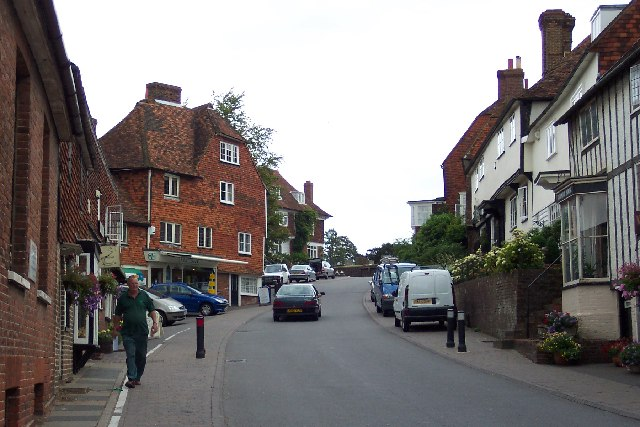
- High Street, Goudhurst

- Location within Kent
- Population: 3,327
- OS grid reference: TQ725375
- Civil parish: Goudhurst
- District: Tunbridge Wells
- Shire county: Kent
- Region: South East
- Country: England
- Sovereign state: United Kingdom
- Post town: CRANBROOK
- Postcode district: TN17
- Dialling code: 01580
- Police: Kent
- Fire: Kent
- Ambulance: South East Coast
- UK Parliament: Tunbridge Wells

Goudhurst is a village and civil parish in the borough of Tunbridge Wells in Kent, England. It lies in the Weald, around 12 miles (19 km) south of Maidstone, on the crossroads of the A262 and B2079.

The parish consists of three wards: Goudhurst, Kilndown and Curtisden Green. Hamlets include Bedgebury Cross, Iden Green, Stonecrouch and Winchet Hill.

== Etymology ==
The word Goudhurst is derived from Goud Hurst, the "Good Hurst" (an opening in a forest) due to the hill's strategic position within the local landscape. A less plausible (but attractive) derivation is the Old English guo hyrst, meaning Battle Hill, or the wooded hill on which a battle has been fought. The name apparently commemorates a battle fought on this high ground in Saxon times. The spelling has evolved over the centuries: Gmthhyrste (c. 1100), Guthurst or Guhthersts (c. 1200), Gudhersts (1232), Guthhurste (1278), Goutherst (1316), Goodherst (1610), then the current-day spelling.

== History ==
The village was one of those involved in the Wealden iron industry; it was a centre for the growing of hops and for weaving. A group of weavers' cottages stands opposite the church.

The Battle of Goudhurst in 1747 led to the end of the Hawkhurst Gang of smugglers and the execution of local gang leader Thomas Kingsmill whose body was hung in chains in the village.

=== St Mary's Church ===
The church stands on a hill and its tower commands views of the surrounding countryside. For this reason it was a major surveying point in the Anglo-French Survey (1784–1790) to measure the precise distance and relationship between the Paris Observatory and the Royal Greenwich Observatory, supervised by General William Roy. Sightings were made to Frant to the west, Tenterden to the east, Wrotham Hill to the north and Fairlight Down to the south.

St Mary's church was founded in 1170 by Robert de Crevecour. The church has been altered and restored many times over the centuries. Until 1637 it had a tall spire which was destroyed by lightning in that year. In 1638 three London masons rebuilt the west tower. During the Victorian era the church was restored by the architects William Slater and Richard Carpenter. The church contains a remarkable painted wood and gesso effigy to Sir Alexander Culpeper (d.1599) and his wife Constance.

=== Bedgebury ===
Bedgebury is one of the oldest estates in Kent: having given its name to the de Bedgebury family, it passed into the hands of the Culpeper family in 1450. When the estate was sold in 1680, a new house was built which itself became a girls' school in the 1920s (closed in the summer of 2006). In 2007 the school was purchased by the Bell Educational Trust, an educational charity. In the summer of 2007 the school reopened as the Bell Bedgebury International School, and the grounds also played host to the Bell Bedgebury Language Centre. In November 2010, the owners decided to close and sell the school.

=== Village Green ===
A former Glebe Field at the East end of St Mary's Church was registered as a village green by Kent County Council in June 2016. It is 2.47 acres (1 ha) in extent and is surrounded by trees and hedges. It is owned by the Diocese of Canterbury and is maintained by Goudhurst Parish Council which has a long lease for this purpose. A volunteer group called The Friends of Goudhurst Village Green has been established with the aim to protect and preserve Goudhurst Village Green for the use of the residents of Goudhurst Parish by right, for lawful sports and pastimes, in perpetuity. St Mary's Church is permitted to use the village green for parking for occasional events such as large weddings and funerals.

=== Public transport ===
In the past, the branch railway line from Paddock Wood had a station for the village. It was opened on 1 October 1892 and was originally named 'Hope Mill for Goudhurst and Lamberhurst' before being renamed to 'Goudhurst' on 4 September 1893, the day the final part of the line came into service – the extension to Hawkhurst via Cranbrook; physically, the station was about half a mile from the centre of Goudhurst, and somewhat further from Lamberhurst. The station was closed on 12 June 1961 because of lack of use, passenger numbers having dropped to fewer than 200 per day. The track was lifted in 1964, and in 1967 the station sites were offered for sale.

At present, the only public transport for Goudhurst are three bus routes– the 23 via Yalding and 27 via Linton l, both of which run to Maidstone and are run by Nu-venture of Aylesford. Additionally the 297 'wealden link' runs to Tunbridge Wells and Pembury in the west and Cranbrook, and Tenterden in the east, this is run by Hams Travel of Flimwell. There are also various other school time only routes.

== Education ==
The village is in the Cranbrook School catchment area.

== Notable people ==
- Ernest Alfred Benians (1880–1952), academic and historian, was born in Goudhurst.
- William Beresford, 1st Viscount Beresford (1768–1856), owned the Bedgebury Estate and built Kilndown in the 1840s.
- Harry Christophers (b 1956), conductor, was born in Goudhurst.
- Leonard Benjamin Franklin (1862–1944), barrister and politician, was born in Goudhurst.
- Sir Jeffrey Gilbert ( 1674–1726 ), jurist and author, was born in Goudhurst.
- Stephen Groombridge (1755–1832), astronomer, was born in Goudhurst.
- Daniel Horsmanden (1691–1778), judge, was born in Goudhurst.
- Sir George Johnson (1818–1896), eminent physician who became recognized as an authority on cholera and kidney diseases, was born in Goudhurst.
- Stephen Law (d c. 1788), Governor of Bombay from 1739 to 1742, lived in Goudhurst at the time of his death.
- William Howard Vincent Levett (1908–55), Kent and England cricketer, was born in Goudhurst.
- Richard Milbourne (d 1624), bishop, was vicar of Goudhurst 1611–15
- Alfred Mynn (1807–61), cricketer, was born in Goudhurst.
- William Rootes (1894–1964), founder of Rootes Group was born in Goudhurst.
- Sir James Stirling (1836–1916), jurist and Privy Councillor, lived at Finchcocks in Goudhurst from 1890 until his death

== Media ==
=== Newspapers ===
Newspapers available in Goudhurst are the free and Maidstone extra owned by KM Group and yourtunbridgewells and yourmaidstone both owned by KOS Media

=== Radio ===
The Local radio station is KMFM West Kent however KMFM Maidstone is also available. County-wide stations Heart South, Gold and BBC Radio Kent are available.

== See also ==
- Listed buildings in Goudhurst
