= Custom House, Poole =

Listed building in Poole, Dorset, England

Coordinates: 50°42′44″N 1°59′20″W

Custom House
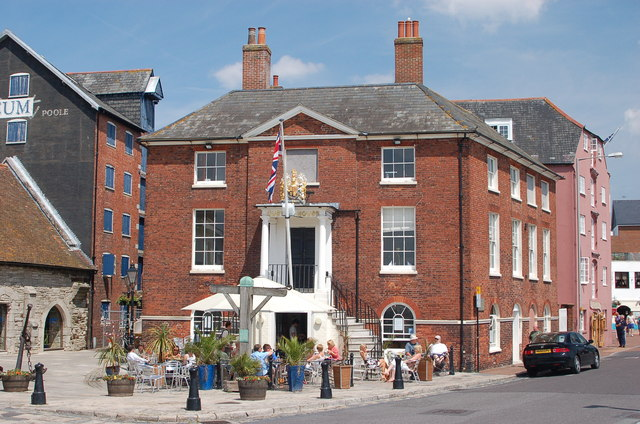
- The Custom House on Poole Quay
- Interactive map of the Custom House area

General information
- Location: Poole Quay, Poole, United Kingdom
- Opened: 1747

The Custom House (formerly known as the King's Custom House) is a Grade II* listed building in Poole, Dorset, England. It is a Georgian building located in the oldest part of Poole Quay, and is currently used as a restaurant.

== History ==
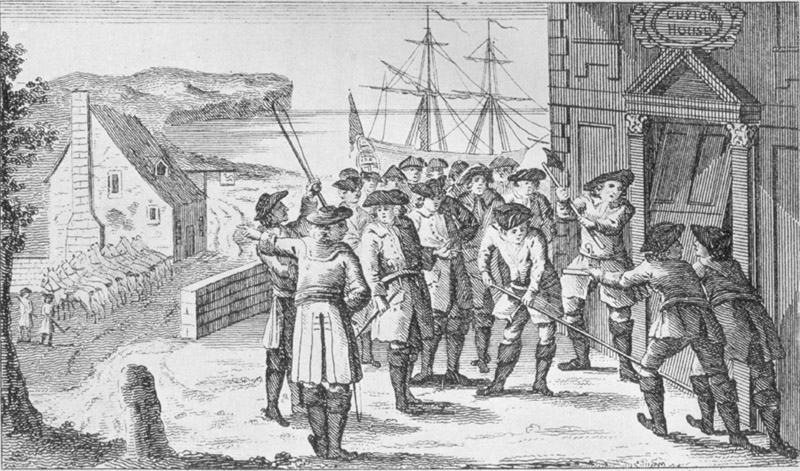
A representation of the Custom House being raided, as in 1747.

The original Custom House building was built in 1747. In the same year, the Custom House was the site of a burglary, in which 30 smugglers, led by members of the Hawkhurst Gang, raided the house and took two tons of smuggled tea and 39 barrels of rum, worth over £500, that had previously been confiscated. The raid happened at night, with the gang reaching Poole at 11 p.m. The tea was then taken through Fordingbridge. Four men were convicted at the Old Bailey in 1749, during which they argued that "there was no crime in smuggling" and that they were just "recovering their own goods". Three of the four men convicted were hanged at Tyburn.

In 1788 the Custom House produced a report on notorious smuggler Isaac Gulliver, noting he focused mainly on wine smuggling. The current Custom House in Poole was built in 1813, during a time in which Poole and Bournemouth were growing; the old Custom House building was destroyed by fire. In the nineteenth century, the Custom House was used for collecting extra taxes for boats entering Poole Harbour. In 1838, the building was run by Gartside & Co. The Custom House was closed by HM Treasury in 1883, with the customs being transferred to Weymouth's custom house. In 1954, the Custom House became a Grade II* listed building.

== Restaurant ==
The Custom House was restored and originally opened as a seafood restaurant in 1997 before changing to the Custom House Cafe in 2018. It overlooks Poole Quay with views of Brownsea Island. On summer Thursdays, the restaurant hosts live music as part of the Poole Quay fireworks displays.
