= List of people gibbeted in the United Kingdom =

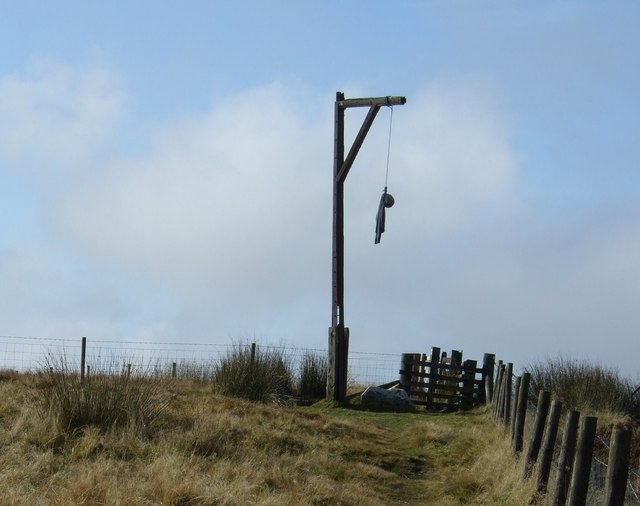
Replica of William Winter's gibbet at Steng Cross, Northumberland

The following is a list of people gibbeted in the United Kingdom and its predecessor states. Gibbeting was the display of the body in some form of cage after death, also known as 'hanging in chains'.

It was fairly common in the 17th century to leave bodies of murderers hanging from the gallows after death. However, from 1660 through 1699, at least 25 men and one woman were specifically hung in chains, all for murder. In the 18th century, specially designed gibbet cages increased in use. There is not evidence that any individual was gibbeted alive after the start of the 18th century. A complete account of all English criminals whose bodies were gibbeted before the early 1730s will likely never be available. At least 226 men were gibbeted between 1700 and April 1752, when the Murder Act came into force. This act stated that criminals convicted of murder should not be buried, but instead hung in chains or anatomised and dissected, regularising the practice. However, it did not considerably increase the number of people gibbeted during the latter half of the 18th century. From 1752 until the outlawing of the practice in the United Kingdom in 1834, two bodies were gibbeted per year in England and Wales with 22 people total being gibbeted in Scotland over this period. The practice had largely died out before 1834, with the exceptions of William Jobling and James Cook, the latter being the last person to be gibbeted by the United Kingdom.

== List of people gibbeted in after 1600 ==
=== 1600s ===
| Offender | Assize county | Crime | Sentenced | Place of execution | Executed | Gibbet location | Grid ref. Geo-coordinates | Gibbeted | Ref. |
|---|---|---|---|---|---|---|---|---|---|
| Wife of Edward Bustle | | Murder of Edward Bustle | | | 1609 | Parish boundary crossing with major road at Shute Shelve, near Axbridge | ST422560 51.30063°N 2.82974°W | 1609 | |
| Humfry Hawkins | | Murder of Edward Bustle | | | 1609 | Parish boundary crossing with major road at Shute Shelve, near Axbridge | ST422560 51.30063°N 2.82974°W | 1609 | |
| Richard Whitfield | | Murder and robbery | | | 1656 | Shooter's Hill | | 1656 | |
| Thomas Lancaster | | Murder of family with poison | | In front of home | 1678 | Gibbet Moss near Hawkshead | | | |
| George Broomham | Hampshire | Murder of wife and son | 1676 | Winchester | 3 Mar 1676 | Combe Gibbet, Gallows Down | SU364622 51.35816°N 1.47790°W | 1676 | |
| Dorothy Newman | Hampshire | Murder of Broomham's wife and son | 1676 | Winchester | 3 Mar 1676 | Combe Gibbet, Gallows Down | SU364622 51.35816°N 1.47790°W | 1676 | |
| Edward Mangall | Yorkshire | | | | | Twin Rivers, East Riding of Yorkshire | SE805208 53.67747°N 0.78280°W | 1690 | |
| Adam Barnes | Buckinghamshire | | | | | Jibbet Ground, Calverton, Buckinghamshire | SP793392 52.04597°N 0.84439°W | 1693 | |

=== 1700–1749 ===
| Offender | Assize county | Crime | Sentenced | Place of execution | Executed | Gibbet location | Grid ref. Geo-coordinates | Gibbeted | Ref. |
|---|---|---|---|---|---|---|---|---|---|
| Edward/Edmund Tool, alias Toolley | Middlesex | Murder and robbery | 15 Feb 1700 | | 2 Feb 1700 | Finchley Common | | Feb 1700 | |
| Michael van Berghen | Middlesex | Murder | 24 Jun 1700 | | 19 Jul 1700 | Between Mile End and Bow | | Jul 1700 | |
| Dromelius Beachere/Gerrard Dromelius | Middlesex | Murder | 24 Jun 1700 | | 19 Jul 1700 | Between Mile End and Bow | | | |
| Roger Lowen | | Murder | | | | Turnham Green, in view of victim's house | | Oct 1706 | |
| William Elby, alias Dunn | Middlesex | Murder | 2 Aug 1717 | | 12 Sept 1707 | Fulham | | Sept 1707 | |
| John Herman Brian | Middlesex | Arson at St James' Street | 16 Oct 1707 | | 24 Oct 1707 | Acton Common gravel pits | | Oct 1707 | |
| William Johnson, alias Holloway | Middlesex | Murder at Newgate | 10 Sept 1712 | | 19 Sept 1712 | Near Holloway, between Islington and Higate | | Sept 1712 | |
| Richard Keele | Middlesex | Murder and housebreaking at Clerkenwell Workhouse | 10 Dec 1713 | | 23 Dec 1713 | Holloway | | Dec 1713 | |
| William Lowther | Middlesex | Murder and housebreaking at Clerkenwell Workhouse | 10 Dec 1713 | | 23 Dec 1713 | Holloway | | Dec 1713 | |
| John Tomkins | Middlesex | | 27 Feb 1717 | | 20 Mar 1717 | Unknown | | | |
| Joseph Still, alias Cotterell | Middlesex | Murder | 28 Feb 1717 | | 22 Mar 1717 | Stamford Hill on Kingsland Road, near Newington | | March 1717 | |
| Francis Williams | | Robbery of mail | | | | Turnham Green | | May 1717 | |
| Matthew Chessey | | Robbery of mail | | | | Enfield parish | | May 1717 | |
| John Price | Middlesex | Murder at Bunhill Fields | 24 Apr 1718 | | 31 May 1718 | Stone bridge by Kingsland | | May 1718 | |
| Matthew Clark | Middlesex | Murder | Unknown | | 28 Jul 1721 | Wilsden Green, near Five Mile Stone | | Jul 1721 | |
| James Shaw | Middlesex | Murder | 12 Jan 1722 | | 8 Feb 1722 | Between Pancras Church and Kentish Town | | Feb 1722 | |
| John Hawkins | Middlesex | Robbery of mail | 10 May 1722 | | 21 May 1722 | Hounslow Heath | | May 1722 | |
| George Simpson | Middlesex | Robbery of mail | 10 May 1722 | | 21 May 1722 | Hounslow Heath | | May 1722 | |
| Benjamin Child | Middlesex | | 10 May 1722 | | 21 May 1722 | Hounslow Heath | | | |
| Robert Bolas | Shropshire | | Unknown | | Unknown | Bolas Hole, River Tern | | | |
| William Bolas | Shropshire | | Unknown | | Unknown | Bolas Hole, River Tern | | | |
| Leonard Thorn | | Murder | | | | Windsor Forest | | June 1723 | |
| John Hawthorn | | Murder | | | | Windsor Forest | | June 1723 | |
| John Gilbert | | Murder | | | | Windsor Forest | | June 1723 | |
| Thomas Hatch | | Murder | | | | Windsor Forest | | June 1723 | |
| John Gutteridge | Surrey | | 19 Mar 1724 | | 1 Apr 1724 | Bristow Causeway | | | |
| George Cutler | Hampshire | | 11 Mar 1726 | | 11 Mar 1726 | Waltham Chase | | | |
| John Winter | Hampshire | | 11 Mar 1726 | | 11 Mar 1726 | Waltham Chase | | | |
| Edward Burnworth | Middlesex | | 5 Apr 1726 | | 10 Apr 1726? | St George's Fields, Southwark | | | |
| William Blewitt | Middlesex | | 5 Apr 1726 | | 10 Apr 1726? | St George's Fields, Southwark | | | |
| Emanuel Dickinson | Middlesex | | 5 Apr 1726 | | 10 Apr 1726? | Kennington Common | | | |
| Thomas Berry | Middlesex | | 5 Apr 1726 | | 10 Apr 1726? | Kennington Common | | | |
| Legee Higgs | Middlesex | | 5 Apr 1726 | | 10 Apr 1726? | Putney Common/Putney Heath | | | |
| John Higgs | Middlesex | | 5 Apr 1726 | | 10 Apr 1726? | Putney Common/Putney Heath | | | |
| Rice Jones | Denbighshire | | 10 Apr 1726 | | 15 Apr 1726 | Wrexham | | | |
| Thomas Billings | Middlesex | Murder | 20 Apr 1726 | | 9 May 1726 | 100 yds from hanging, on road to Paddington, near Tyburn | | May 1726 | |
| John Humphrey | Glamorgan | | 5 Sept 1726 | | 7 Oct 1726 | Unknown | | | |
| Roger Bryany | Gloucestershire | | 11 Mar 1727 | | Unknown | Unknown | | | |
| Henry Brookman | Somerset | | 8 Apr 1727 | | 26 Apr 1727 | Belton Meeting House, Hursley Hill | | | |
| John Wilson | Surrey | | 8 Apr 1729 | | Unknown | Kennington Common | | | |
| William 'Old' Skull | Somerset | | 14 Aug 1729 | | Unknown | Old Down | | | |
| Ferdinando Shrimpton | Middlesex | Murder and robbery | 28 Feb 1730 | | 17 Apr 1730 | Stamford Hill, near Joseph Still | TQ3365587805 51.57328°N 0.07276°W | Apr 1730 | |
| Robert Drummond | Middlesex | Murder and robbery | 28 Feb 1730 | | 17 Apr 1730 | Stamford Hill, near Joseph Still | TQ3365587805 51.57328°N 0.07276°W | Apr 1730 | |
| Hugh Horton/Norton | Middlesex | Robbery of mail at Knightsbridge | 8 Apr 1730 | Committed suicide at Newgate prior to execution | 12 May 1730 | Hounslow Heath | | May 1730 | |
| John Chappel | Middlesex | | 24 Feb 1731 | | 8 Mar 1731 | Stone Bridge | | | |
| William Williams | Middlesex | Murder at Somerset House | 24 Feb 1731 | Turnham Green | 8 Mar 1731 | Turnham Green | | Jan 1735 | |
| Robert Weaver | Herefordshire | | 14 Mar 1731 | | 27 Mar 1731 | White Hill, Weobley | | | |
| John Naden | Staffordshire | | 16 Aug 1731 | | 30 Aug 1731 | Gun-Heath, Leek | | | |
| Benjamin Cruse | Devon | | 20 Mar 1732 | | 12 Apr 1732 | Unknown | | | |
| Stephen Woon | Devon | | 20 Mar 1732 | | 12 Apr 1732 | Unknown | | | |
| Ely Hatton | Gloucestershire | | 19 Aug 1732 | | 4 Sept 1732 | Meane Hill near Mitchel Dean | | | |
| Isaac Hallam | Lincolnshire | | 5 Mar 1733 | | 20 Mar 1733 | Near crime | | | |
| Thomas Hallam | Lincolnshire | | 5 Mar 1733 | | 20 Mar 1733 | Faldingworth | | | |
| John Notton | Suffolk | | 5 Mar 1734 | | 3 Apr 1734 | Rymerton | | | |
| John Jacob Davies | Sussex | | 12 Aug 1734 | | 21 Aug 1734 | Ditchelling | | | |
| Joseph Rose | Middlesex | Burglary | 26 Feb 1735 | Tyburn | 10 Mar 1735 | Hendon Lane, near Edgware | | Mar 1735 | |
| William Bush/Saunders | Middlesex | Burglary | 26 Feb 1735 | Tyburn | 10 Mar 1735 | Red Hill, near Edgeware Turnpike | | Mar 1735 | |
| Humphrey Walker | Middlesex | Burglary | 26 Feb 1735 | Tyburn | 10 Mar 1735 | Hendon Lane, near Edgware | | Mar 1735 | |
| John Field | Middlesex | Burglary | 26 Feb 1735 | Tyburn | 10 Mar 1735 | Red Hill, near Edgeware Turnpike | | Mar 1735 | |
| Samuel Gregory | Middlesex | Rape, robbery and burglary | 26 Feb 1735 | Tyburn | 4 Jun 1735 | Edgeware Road by St George's Fields | | Jun 1735 | |
| Evan Hugh Jones | Montgomeryshire | | 2 Aug 1735 | | Aug 1735 | Manafon | | | |
| Herbert Hayns | Essex | | 23 Jul 1735 | | 8 Aug 1735 | Essex | | | |
| John Weekes | Sussex | | 2 Aug 1735 | | 11 Aug 1735 | Unknown | | | |
| Edmund Goodrich | Gloucestershire | | 9 Aug 1735 | Gloucester | 22 Aug 1735 | Corse Lawn, Cheltenham | | | |
| William Blackwell/Blackwall | Middlesex | Burglary | 15 Oct 1735 | Tyburn | 8–10 Nov 1735 | Paddington Common | | Nov 1735 | |
| Thomas Marshall | Buckinghamshire | | 8 Mar 1736 | Wycombe | 22 Mar 1736 | Rye Common, Chipping Wicombe | | 22 Mar 1736 | |
| Richard Marshall | Buckinghamshire | | 8 Mar 1736 | Wycombe | 22 Mar 1736 | Rye Common, Chipping Wicombe | | 22 Mar 1736 | |
| Hugh Moss | Cheshire | | 21 Apr 1736 | | 8 May 1736 | Ettley Heath | | | |
| William Hawthorne | Cheshire | | 21 Apr 1736 | | 8 May 1736 | Ettley Heath | | | |
| David Anderson | Kent | | 16 Aug 1736 | Hambledown | 2 Sept 1736 | Hambledown | | | |
| John James | Surrey | | 6 Aug 1735 | Kennington Common | 20 Aug 1735 | Kennington Common | | | |
| Joseph Emerson | Surrey | | 6 Aug 1735 | Kennington Common | 20 Aug 1735 | Kennington Common | | | |
| William Maw | Middlesex | Murder at St Margaret's, Westminster | 16 Feb 1737 | Tyburn | 3 Mar 1737 | Shepherd's Bush near Kensington Gravel Pits | | Mar 1737 | |
| Jeffrey Morat | Middlesex | Burglary at St George's, Hanover Square | 16 Feb 1737 | Tyburn planned, died in Newgate prior to execution | 3 Mar 1737 | Shepherd's Bush near Kensington Gravel Pits | | Mar 1737 | |
| Michael Moorey | Hampshire | | 2 Mar 1737 | Winchester | 19 Mar 1737 | Arreton, Isle of Wight | | | |
| Thomas Savage | Warwickshire | | Unknown | 12 miles from Warwick gaol | Apr 1737 | 12 miles from Warwick gaol | | | |
| George Price | Middlesex | | 13 Jan 1738 | | 21 Feb 1738 | Hounslow Heath? | | | |
| John Sturabout | Berkshire | | 27 Feb 1738 | Tilehouse Heath | 11 Mar 1738 | Coldbourne Hill, Tilehouse Heath | | 11 Mar 1738 | |
| Gill Smith | Surrey | | 16 Mar 1738 | Kennington Common | 10 Apr 1738 | Kennington Common | | 10 Apr 1738 | |
| John Cotton | Northamptonshire | | 6 Mar 1739 | | 22 Mar 1739 | Paulerspury Common | | | |
| Thomas Willot | Staffordshire | | 15 Mar 1749 | Mere Heath | Apr 1739 | Mere Heath | | | |
| James Caldclough | Middlesex | Robbery at Knightsbridge | 7 Jun 1739 | Tyburn | 2 Jul 1739 | Hounslow Heath | | Jul 1739 | |
| Joseph Morris | Middlesex | Robbery at Knightsbridge | 7 Jun 1739 | Tyburn | 2 Jul 1739 | Hounslow Heath | | Jul 1739 | |
| Michael Curry | Northumberland | | 20 Aug 1739 | Newcastle | 4 Sept 1739 | St Mary's Isle or Hartley | | | |
| Thomas Limpous | Somerset | | 29 Aug 1739 | Dunkit Hill, a mile from Wells | 21 Sept 1739 | Dunkit Hill | | 21 Sept 1739 | |
| Henry Wheeler | Wiltshire | | 8 Mar 1740 | | 29 Mar 1740 | Unknown | | | |
| Charles Drew | Suffolk | | 24 Mar 1740 | | 9 Apr 1740 | Long Melford | | | |
| Edward Ellis | Flintshire | | 12 Apr 1740 | | 26 Apr 1740 | Flint marshes | | | |
| Cornelius York | Somerset | | 31 Mar 1740 | | 3 May 1740 | Brislington Common | | | |
| Benjamin Randall | Buckinghamshire | | 16 Jul 1740 | | 8 Aug 1740 | Loudwater | | | |
| William Creake | Surrey | | 30 Jul 1740 | | 25 Aug 1740 | Gibbet Lane between Camberley and Bagshot | | | |
| John Millard | Somerset | | 31 Aug 1740 | | 4 Sept 1740 | Bedminster Down | | | |
| Thomas Edwards | Denbighshire | | 22 Aug 1740 | | 8 Sept 1740 | Llangollen | | | |
| Lawrence Holliday | Sussex | | 16 Mar 1741 | | 1 Apr 1741 | Fairlight Common | | | |
| Bryan Connell | Northamptonshire | | 10 Mar 1741 | | 3 Apr 1741 | Weedon Common | | | |
| Matthew Mahony | Somerset | | 2 Apr 1741 | | 17 Apr 1741 | Bristol, by river | | | |
| Captain Goodere | Somerset | | 2 Apr 1741 | | 17 Apr 1741 | Bristol, by river | | | |
| John Carr | Middlesex | Robbery | 5 Apr 1741 | | 2 May 1741 | Finchley Common | | May 1741 | |
| James Hall | Middlesex | Murder (petty treason) and robbery at Catherine Street, the Strand | 28 Aug 1741 | | 14 Sept 1741 | Shepherd's Bush, 3 miles from Tyburn Turnpike, on road to Acton | | Sept 1741 | |
| William Tyler | Lincolnshire | | Unknown | | Mar 1742 | Pinchbeck | | | |
| Richard Pilgrim | Hertfordshire | | 4 Mar 1742 | | 22 Mar 1742 | Knebworth | | | |
| Robert Carleton | Norfolk | | 18 Mar 1742 | | 5 Apr 1742 | Diss | | | |
| Domingo Goodheart | Hampshire | | 1 Mar 1743 | | 16 Mar 1743 | Unknown | | | |
| Joseph Mulloe | Gloucestershire | | 3 Mar 1743 | | 22 Mar 1743 | Rodborough Hill | | | |
| John Codlin | Norfolk | | 10 Mar 1743 | | 7 Apr 1743 | Bunwell | | | |
| John Roberts | Caernarfon | | Unknown | | 22 Apr 1743 | Twllhely Marsh | | | |
| Hugh Edward | Caernarfon | | Unknown | | 22 Apr 1743 | Twllhely Marsh | | | |
| John Breads | Sussex | | Unknown | | 8 Jun 1743 | Rye | | | |
| Edward Wollaston | Shropshire | | 30 Jul 1743 | | Aug 1743 | Unknown | | | |
| Thomas Cambrey | Gloucestershire | | 3 Mar 1744 | | 20 Mar 1744 | Bowling Green House, Cirencester | | | |
| Andrew Burnet | Gloucestershire | | 3 Mar 1744 | | 22 Mar 1744 | Hot Well, Durdham Down | | | |
| Henry Payne | Gloucestershire | | 3 Mar 1744 | | 22 Mar 1744 | Hot Well, Durdham Down | | | |
| John Knott | Bedfordshire | | 12 Jul 1744 | | 28 Jul 1744 | Luton Down | | | |
| John Snell | Hertfordshire | | 28 Mar 1745 | | Mar 1745 | Hanging Wood | | | |
| John Parr | Oxfordshire | | Unknown | | Unknown | Banbury | | | |
| Thomas Dyer | Devon | | 17 Mar 1746 | Woodbury Down | 11 Apr 1746 | Woodbury Down | | 11 Apr 1746 | |
| Matthew Henderson | Middlesex | Murder (petty treason) | 9-11 Apr 1746 | | 25 Apr 1746 | Edworth Road, possibly Edgware Road | | Apr 1746 | |
| Francis Wilkins | Somerset | | 2 Sept 1746 | Taunton | Sept 1746 | Black Down | | | |
| Marey John Galway | Somerset | | 2 Sept 1746 | Taunton | Sept 1746 | Chiluton Heath, possibly Chilton Cantilo | | | |
| Richard Ashcroft | Middlesex | Smuggling in Sussex | 4 Jun 1747 | | 16 Jul 1747 | Shepherd's Bush | | 29 Jul 1747 | |
| John Cook | Middlesex | Smuggling in Kent | 15 Jul 1747 | | 16 Jul 1747 | Shepherd's Bush | | 29 Jul 1747 | |
| Samuel Hullock | Middlesex | Murder near Tower of London | Unknown | | 31 Jul 1747 | Stamford Hill | TQ3365587805 51.57328°N 0.07276°W | Jul 1747 | |
| Hosea Youell | Middlesex | Murder at Devonshire Square | 14 Oct 1747 | | 16 Nov 1747 | Stamford Hill | | Nov 1747 | |
| Samuel Austin | Middlesex | Smuggling in Kent | 9 Dec 1747 | | 21 Dec 1747 | Shepherd's Bush | | 21 Dec 1747 | |
| William Whurrier | Middlesex | | 24 Feb 1748 | | 18 Mar 1748 | Finchley Common | | | |
| Thomas Bibby | Hertfordshire | | 10 Mar 1748 | | 25 Mar 1748 | Gravel Pits, St Albans | | | |
| Abraham Durrill | Wiltshire | | 5 Mar 1748 | | 30 Mar 1748 | Great Bedwyn | | | |
| Stephen Pettitt | Suffolk | | 14 Mar 1748 | | 2 Apr 1748 | 1 mile from Ipswich | | | |
| William Salter | Norfolk | | 10 Mar 1748 | | 12 Apr 1748 | Holt | TG092392 52.909409°N 1.10963°E | | |
| Francis Herbert | Kent | | 21 Mar 1748 | | 14 Apr 1748 | Unknown | | | |
| William Hartnup | Kent | Smuggling | 21 Mar 1748 | | 14 Apr 1748 | Goudhurst Gore | | 14 Apr 1648 | |
| Arthur Gray | Middlesex | Smuggling | 20 Apr 1748 | | 11 May 1748 | Stamford Hill | TQ3365587805 51.57328°N 0.07276°W | 11 May 1748 | |
| Adam Graham | Cumbria | | 13 Aug 1748 | | 10 Sept 1748 | Kingmoor, Carlisle | | | |
| Richard 'Dick' Biggs | Somerset | Murder of wife | 23 Aug 1748 | | 14 Sept 1748 | Three Holes Down, Bath | ST737626 51.36230°N 2.37841°W | | |
| John Juckers | Cambridgeshire | | Unknown | | 7 Nov 1748 | Whitlesea | | | |
| Benjamin Tapner | Sussex | Murder | 16 Jan 1749 | | 18 Jan 1749 | Rook's Hill, Chichester | | 19 Jan 1749 | |
| William Carter | Sussex | Murder | 16 Jan 1749 | | 18 Jan 1749 | Portsmouth Road, Rake | | 19 Jan 1749 | |
| John Cobby | Sussex | Murder | 16 Jan 1749 | | 18 Jan 1749 | Selsey Isle | | 19 Jan 1749 | |
| John Hammond | Sussex | Murder | 16 Jan 1749 | | 18 Jan 1749 | Selsey Isle | | 19 Jan 1749 | |
| John Mills | Sussex | Murder | 13 Mar 1749 | Sindon Common | 20 Mar 1749 | Sindon Common | | 20 Mar 1749 | |
| Henry Shearman/Sheerman | Sussex | Murder | 13 Mar 1749 | Rake | 21 Mar 1749 | Rake | | 21 Mar 1749 | |
| James Watkins | Monmouthshire | | 9 Mar 1749 | | 29 Mar 1749 | Unknown | | | |
| William Fairall | Middlesex | Robbery of Customs House | 5 Apr 1749 | Tyburn | 26 Apr 1749 | Gibbet Lane, Horsmonden | TQ70124078 51.14106°N 0.43057°E | 26 Apr 1749 | |
| Thomas Kingsmill | Middlesex | Robbery of Customs House | 5 Apr 1749 | Tyburn | 26 Apr 1749 | Goudhurst Gore | | 26 Apr 1749 | |
| Richard Maplesden/Mapelden | Middlesex | Smuggling | 5 Jul 1749 | | 4 Aug 1749 | Lamberhurst or Lewes, Sussex | | 4 Aug 1749 | |
| Edmund Richards | Sussex | Murder | 29 Jul 1749 | Hambrook Common | 9 Aug 1749 | Hambrook Common | | 9 Aug 1749 | |
| George Chapman | Sussex | Murder | 29 Jul 1749 | Hurst Common | 19 Aug 1749 | Hurst Common | | 19 Aug 1749 | |
| Joseph Abseny | Gloucestershire | | 5 Aug 1749 | Durdham Down | 25 Aug 1749 | Durdham Down | | 25 Aug 1749 | |
| Thomas Supple | Surrey | | 3 Aug 1749 | | 25 Aug 1749 | Kingston | | | |

=== 1750–1799 ===
| Offender | Assize county | Crime | Sentenced | Place of execution | Executed | Gibbet location | Grid ref. Geo-coordinates | Gibbeted | Ref. |
|---|---|---|---|---|---|---|---|---|---|
| Gabriel Tomkins | Bedfordshire | | 8 Mar 1750 | | 23 Mar 1750 | Chalk Hill between Dunstable and Hockley | | | |
| Thomas Wakelin | Northamptonshire | | 13 Mar 1750 | | 23 Mar 1750 | Dunstable Road | | | |
| Richard Merrick | Gloucestershire | | 10 Mar 1750 | | 28 Mar 1750 | By monument on Lansdown | | | |
| Thomas Nunn | Essex | | 13 Mar 1750 | | 6 Apr 1750 | Harrolds Wood Common, near Rumford Gallows | | | |
| John Hall | Essex | | 13 Mar 1750 | | 6 Apr 1750 | Harrolds Wood Common, near Rumford Gallows | | | |
| William Kemp | Hampshire | | 6 Mar 1750 | | 16 Jun 1750 | Unknown | | | |
| John Ogleby | Kent | | 31 Jul 1750 | | 23 Aug 1750 | Alberry Hill | | | |
| Toby Gill | Suffolk | | 16 Aug 1750 | | 14 Sept 1750 | Blythburgh | | | |
| Garrett Delaney | Cheshire | | 3 Sept 1750 | | 22 Sept 1750 | Great Saughall | | | |
| Edward Johnson | Cheshire | | 3 Sept 1750 | | 22 Sept 1750 | Great Saughall | | | |
| John Barchard | Norfolk | | 10 Aug 1750 | | 26 Sept 1750 | By the sea, 1 mile from Yarmouth Gallows | TG47381783 52.701428°N 1.660089°E | | |
| James Cooper | Surrey | | 9 Aug 1750 | | 30 Aug 1750 | Croomhurst | | | |
| Thomas Colley | Hertfordshire | | 29 Jul 1751 | Gubblecote | 24 Aug 1751 | Gubblecote | | 24 Aug 1751 | |
| James Welch | Surrey | | 15 Aug 1751 | | Unknown | Drixton Causeway | | | |
| Thomas Jones | Surrey | | 15 Aug 1751 | | Unknown | Drixton Causeway | | | |
| Robert Steel | Middlesex | | 11 Sept 1751 | | 23 Oct 1751 | Shepherd's Bush | | | |
| Anthony De Rosa | Middlesex | | 19 Feb 1752 | | Mar 1752 | Stamford Hill | | | |
| John Swan | Essex | | 9 Mar 1752 | Epping Forest | 28 Mar 1752 | Ten Mile Stone, Epping Forest, possibly Buckets Hill, 6 miles from execution | | 30 March 1752 | |
| John Young/Davy | Devon | | 16 Mar 1752 | | 3 Apr 1752 | Ingoldsby Common, 45 miles from Exeter | | | |
| Robert Derby | Surrey | | 30 Mar 1752 | | 24 Apr 1752 | Black Water | | | |
| John Salisbury | Middlesex | Robbery of turnpike officer at Smallberry Green | 8 Apr 1752 | | 27 Apr 1752 | Hounslow Heath/Smallberry Green | | Apr 1752 | |
| William Chaplain | Norfolk | | 28 Jul 1752 | | 22 Jul 1752 | Kings Lynn Common, Wisbech Road-Saddlebow Road junction | TF6194518895 52.743396°N 0.397595°E | | |
| Anthony Colpris | Dorset | | 23 Jul 1752 | | 25 Jul 1752 | Windmill Point, Poole | | | |
| Thomas Otley | Suffolk | | 23 Jul 1752 | Bury St Edmunds | 27 Jul 1752 | Black Close Hill near road to Newmarket | | | |
| John Grace | Kent | | 29 Jul 1752 | Hoo/Howe/Hope Common near Rochester | 13 Aug 1752 | Hoo/Howe/Hope Common near Rochester | | 13 Aug 1752 | |
| Christopher Johnson | Middlesex | Murder and robbery of mail | 18 Jul 1753 | | 23 Jul 1753 | Winchmore Hill | | July 1753 | |
| John Stockdale | Middlesex | Murder and robbery of mail | 18 Jul 1753 | | 23 Jul 1753 | Winchmore Hill | | July 1753 | |
| William Morgan | Radnorshire | | 4 Apr 1754 | | 10 Apr 1754 | Llowes | | | |
| George Davies | Buckinghamshire | | 10 Mar 1755 | Gerrards Cross on Holtspur Heath, road from Beaconsfield to High Wycombe | 31 Mar 1755 | Gerrards Cross on Holtspur Heath, road from Beaconsfield to High Wycombe | | 31 Mar 1755 | |
| Josiah Hugh | Glamorgan | | 19 Aug 1755 | | 10 Sept 1755 | Penmark | | | |
| Edward Morgan | Glamorgan | | 30 Mar 1757 | | 6 Apr 1757 | Eglwysilan common | | | |
| John Gatward | Hertfordshire | | 11 Apr 1757 | Colliers End | 27 Apr 1757 | Colliers End | | 27 April 1757 | |
| Matthew Snatt | Essex | | 29 Jul 1757 | Chelmsford | 12 Aug 1757 | Buckett's Hill/Bare Faced Stagg in Epping Forrest | | | |
| John Freeman | Cambridgeshire | | Unknown | | 17 Oct 1757 | Guyhirn | | | |
| James Pookey | Essex | | 13 Mar 1758 | Chelmsford | 18 Mar 1758 | Chinkford Hatch, Epping Forrest, Walthamstow | | | |
| William Moore | Kent | | 20 Mar 1758 | | 27 Mar 1758 | Chatham Hill | | 29 March 1758 | |
| John Grindrod | Lancashire | | 17 Mar 1759 | Lancaster | 24 Mar 1759 | Pendleton Moor | | | |
| Thomas Brown | Lincolnshire | | 12 Mar 1759 | Ancholm Corner near Spital | 28 Mar 1759 | Ancholm Corner near Spital | | 28 Mar 1759 | |
| Benjamin Downing | Essex | | 12 Mar 1759 | Chelmsford | 30 Mar 1759 | Radwinter | | | |
| Eugene Aram | Yorkshire | | 28 Jul 1759 | York | 6 Aug 1759 | Knaresborough Forest | | | |
| Thomas Darby | Shropshire | | 6 Aug 1759 | Salisbury | 11 Aug 1759 | Darby's Hill, Oldbury | | | |
| Joseph Darby | Shropshire | | 6 Aug 1759 | Salisbury | 11 Aug 1759 | Darby's Hill, Oldbury | | | |
| Robert Saxby | Surrey | | 9 Aug 1759 | | 13 Aug 1759 | Wootton | | | |
| John Cardinal | Hertfordshire | | 5 Dec 1760 | | 17 Mar 1760 | Unknown | | | |
| Jacob Murton | Hertfordshire | | 5 Dec 1760 | | 17 Mar 1760 | Unknown | | | |
| Francis Roper | Glamorgan | | 9 Apr 1760 | | 15 Apr 1760 | Llantwit | | | |
| William Odell | Middlesex | Murder | 10 Sept 1760 | | 15 Sept 1760 | Ealing Common near Acton | | Sept 1760 | |
| Patric McCarty | Middlesex | Murder at Drury Lane | 22 Oct 1760 | | 25 Oct 1760 | Finchley Common | | Oct 1760 | |
| Daniel Ginger | Hertfordshire | | 4 Mar 1761 | Colney | 11 Mar 1761 | Colney, 15 miles from Hertford | | | |
| Edward Johnson | Suffolk | | 16 Mar 1761 | Sudbury | 23 Mar 1761 | Sudbury | | 23 Mar 1761 | |
| Jean Baptiste Pickard | Kent | | 16 Mar 1761 | Possibly Sissinghurst | 25 Mar 1761 | Possibly Sissinghurst | | | |
| Theodore Gardelle | Middlesex | Murder at Leicester Fields | 1 Apr 1761 | | 4 Apr 1761 | Hounslow Heath | | Apr 1761 | |
| Francis Arsine | Hampshire | | 29 Jun 1761 | Winchester | 4 Jul 1761 | Blockhouse Point, Portsmouth | | 4 Jun 1761 | |
| Robert Williams | Glamorgan | | 4 Aug 1761 | | 10 Aug 1761 | Swansea | | | |
| Patrick Ward | Somerset | | Unknown | | 20 Oct 1761 | Broad Pitt near Kingsroad | | | |
| Richard Parrott | Middlesex | Murder | 21 Oct 1761 | | 26 Oct 1761 | Hounslow Heath | | Oct 1761 | |
| George Harger | Yorkshire | | 6 Mar 1762 | | 18 Apr 1762 | Unknown | | | |
| John Plackett | Middlesex | Robbery at Wellclose Square | 14 Jul 1762 | | Jul 1762 | Finchley Common | | Jul 1762 | |
| Daniel Ryan | Lincolnshire | | 26 Jul 1762 | | Aug 1762 | Unknown | | | |
| William Buckley | Worcestershire | | 11 Aug 1762 | Worcester | 14 Aug 1762 | Wyre Forest | | | |
| Daniel Blake | Middlesex | Murder at Berkeley Square | 23 Feb 1763 | | Feb 1763 | Hounslow Heath | | Feb 1763 | |
| Thomas Hanks | Gloucestershire | | 9 Mar 1763 | | 14 Mar 1763 | Wick Bissington, near murder site | | 16 Mar 1763 | |
| Thomas Watkins | Berkshire | | 5 Mar 1764 | Market Place, Windsor | 9 Mar 1764 | Gallows Lane, Windsor | | 9 Mar 1764 | |
| John Croxford | Northamptonshire | | 31 Jul 1764 | Northampton | 4 Aug 1764 | Hollowell Green | | | |
| William Corbet | Surrey | | 29 Mar 1764 | Kennington Common | 6 Apr 1764 | Gallery Wall between Rotherhithe and Deptford | | | |
| William Jacques | Wiltshire | | 4 Aug 1764 | Stanton Fields, Stanton Street, Quentin | 14 Aug 1764 | Stanton Fields | | 14 Aug 1764 | |
| Andrew Benevenuto | Kent | | Unknown | | Unknown | Pennenden Heath | | | |
| Simon Pignano | Kent | | Unknown | | Unknown | Pennenden Heath | | | |
| Edward Drury | Warwickshire | Murder | 6 Apr 1765 | Stoneleigh Common | 17 Apr 1765 | Gibbett Hill, Stoneleigh Common | SP30707480 52.37044°N 1.55044°W | 17 Apr 1765 | |
| Robert Lesley | Warwickshire | Murder | 6 Apr 1765 | Stoneleigh Common | 17 Apr 1765 | Gibbett Hill, Stoneleigh Common | SP30707480 52.37044°N 1.55044°W | 17 Apr 1765 | |
| Moses Baker | Warwickshire | Murder | 6 Apr 1765 | Stoneleigh Common | 17 Apr 1765 | Gibbett Hill, Stoneleigh Common | SP30707480 52.37044°N 1.55044°W | 17 Apr 1765 | |
| William Whittle | Lancashire | | 29 Mar 1766 | | 5 Apr 1766 | Cliff Lane Ends, Farington | | | |
| John Smith | Lancashire | | 9 Aug 1766 | | 23 Aug 1766 | Beacon's Gutter, 1 mile from Liverpool | | | |
| Robert Rymes | Dorset | | 19 Mar 1767 | Western Road | 24 Mar 1767 | Western Road | | 24 Mar 1767 | |
| John Scott | Shropshire | | 4 Apr 1767 | Bridgnorth | 21 Apr 1767 | Coppy foot on the Morse, Bridgnorth | | 21 Apr 1767 | |
| Phillip Phillip | Camarthen | | 15 Apr 1767 | | 22 Apr 1767 | Newcastle Emlyn | | | |
| Robert Jones | Gloucestershire | | 1 Aug 1767 | | 7 Aug 1767 | Bourton on the Hill | | | |
| Robert Downs/Downe | Nottinghamshire | | 6 Aug 1767 | Nottingham | 10 Aug 1767 | Mansfield Forest | | | |
| Thomas Nicholson | Cumbria | | 25 Aug 1767 | Penrith | 31 Aug 1767 | Carlton Fell, Penrith | | 31 Aug 1767 | |
| John Curtis | Wiltshire | | 5 Mar 1768 | Hernham Hill | 14 Mar 1768 | Hernham Hill or Lower Burn Beck, Britford | | | |
| Thomas Lee | Yorkshire | | 16 Jul 1768 | York | 25 Jul 1768 | Grassington Gate | | | |
| James Williams | Hampshire | | 16 Jul 1768 | | 28 Jul 1768 | Southsea Beach, Portsmouth | | | |
| Philip Hooton | Lincolnshire | | 1 Mar 1769 | | 6 Mar 1769 | Surfleet Common | | | |
| John Whitfield | Cumbria | | 29 Jul 1769 | Carlisle | 9 Aug 1769 | Near Armithwaite | | 9 Aug 1769 | |
| John Franklin | Wiltshire | | 31 Mar 1770 | Bockington Abney | 20 Apr 1770 | Bockington Abney | | | |
| William Spiggott | Herefordshire | | 24 Jul 1770 | Hereford | 30 Jul 1770 | Hardwick Common, Hay | | | |
| William Walter Evan | Herefordshire | | 24 Jul 1770 | Hereford | 30 Jul 1770 | Hardwick Common, Hay | | | |
| John Stretton | Middlesex | Robbery of mail | 11 Jul 1770 | | 1 Aug 1770 | Finchley Common | | Aug 1770 | |
| Peter Conoway | Middlesex | Murder | 11 Jul 1770 | | 1 Aug 1770 | Bow Common | | Aug 1770 | |
| Michael Richardson | Middlesex | Murder | 11 Jul 1770 | | 1 Aug 1770 | Bow Common | | Aug 1770 | |
| Robert Hazlett | Durham | | 14 Aug 1770 | | 18 Sept 1770 | Gateshead Fell | | | |
| John/Jack Uppington/Upperton | Sussex | | 18 Mar 1771 | Horsham | 6 Apr 1771 | Wepham Wood | | | |
| Joseph Guyant | Middlesex | Robbery of mail | 3 Jun 1772 | | 8 Jul 1772 | Finchley Common | | Jul 1772 | |
| Joseph Allpress | Middlesex | Robbery of mail | 3 Jun 1772 | | 8 Jul 1772 | Finchley Common | | Jul 1772 | |
| William Keeley | Gloucestershire | | 22 Aug 1772 | Campden | 28 Aug 1772 | Campden | | 28 Aug 1772 | |
| William Amor | Wiltshire | | 6 Mar 1773 | | 16 Mar 1773 | Pewsey Down | | | |
| Edward Corbett | Buckinghamshire | | 19 Jul 1773 | Buckingham | 23 Jul 1773 | Bierton | | | |
| Walter Kidson | Worcestershire | | 21 Aug 1773 | | 27 Aug 1773 | Stourbridge Common | | | |
| Thomas Owen | Radnorshire | | 23 Mar 1754 | | 29 Mar 1754 | Evenjobb Hill, New Radnor | | | |
| Robert Jones | Flintshire | | 5 Apr 1774 | | 25 Apr 1774 | Lightwood | | | |
| Robert Thomas | Yorkshire | | 16 Jul 1774 | York | 6 Aug 1774 | Beacon Hill, Halifax | | | |
| Matthew Cocklane | Derby | | 16 Mar 1776 | | 21 Mar 1776 | Bradshaw Hay | | | |
| Matthew Norminton | Yorkshire | | 9 Mar 1776 | York | 15 Apr 1776 | Beacon Hill, Halifax | | | |
| James Hill | Hampshire | | 4 Mar 1777 | | 10 Mar 1777 | Blackhouse Point | | | |
| Samuel Thorly | Cheshire | | 3 Apr 1777 | Boughton | 10 Apr 1777 | Congleton Heath | | 11 Apr 1777 | |
| John Thomas | Denbighshire | | 28 Mar 1777 | | 21 Apr 1777 | Rosset Green, Marfod Mill | | | |
| Joseph Armstrong | Gloucestershire | | Unknown | | Unknown | Near Cheltenham | | | |
| Joseph Maseley | Hampshire | | 3 Mar 1778 | | 9 Mar 1778 | Exton | | | |
| Morris Rowlands | Caernarfon | | 18 Apr 1778 | | 25 Apr 1778 | Dalar Hir | | | |
| Thomas Arthur | Glamorgan | | 22 Aug 1778 | | 28 Aug 1778 | Monydd Buchan | | | |
| George Easthop | Staffordshire | | 25 Mar 1779 | Bradbury/Cradley Heath | 29 Mar 1779 | Bradbury/Cradley Heath | | 29 Mar 1779 | |
| John Bowland | Rutland | | 7 Jul 1789 | Oakham | 15 Jul 1789 | Empington/Erpingham Common | | | |
| John Spencer | Nottinghamshire | | 22 Jul 1779 | Nottingham | 26 Jul 1779 | Scrooby | | | |
| Thomas/John Knight | Kent | | 13 Mar 1780 | Maidstone | 18 Mar 1780 | Bostall Hill, Whitstable | | | |
| William Wotton | Devon | | 13 Mar 1780 | | 20 Mar 1780 | Broadbury Down | | | |
| John Clay | Warwickshire | | 22 Mar 1783 | Warwick | 29 Mar 1781 | Chilvers Common | | | |
| Thomas Hammond | Warwickshire | | 27 Mar 1781 | Washwood Heath | 2 Apr 1781 | Washwood Heath | | 2 Apr 1781 | |
| John Pitmore | Warwickshire | | 27 Mar 1781 | Washwood Heath | 2 Apr 1781 | Washwood Heath | | 2 Apr 1781 | |
| John Bryan | Hampshire | | 24 Jul 1781 | Winchester | 30 Jul 1781 | Blockhouse Point, Portsmouth | | | |
| John Andrews | Devon | | 6 Aug 1781 | Exeter | 24 Aug 1781 | Unknown | | | |
| William Smith | Middlesex | Robbery of mail | 20 Feb 1782 | | 24 Apr 1782 | Finchley Common | | Apr 1782 | |
| Francis Fearn | Yorkshire | | 13 Jul 1782 | | 23 Jul 1782 | Loxley Common | | | |
| Charles Storey | Kent | | 22 Jul 1782 | Maidstone | 26 Jul 1782 | Cartham | | | |
| James May | Suffolk | | 18 Mar 1783 | | 24 Mar 1783 | Eriswell | | | |
| Jeremiah Theobald | Suffolk | | 18 Mar 1783 | | 24 Mar 1783 | Eriswell | | | |
| Jenkin William Prothero | Gloucestershire | | 26 Mar 1783 | | 31 Mar 1783 | Durdham Down | | | |
| Thomas Wardle | Worcestershire | | 2 Aug 1783 | | 7 Aug 1783 | Bromsgrove Lock | | | |
| William Peare | Wiltshire | | Unknown | | 19 Aug 1783 | Near Chippenham | | | |
| George Goodwin | Somerset | | 23 Aug 1783 | | 10 Sept 1783 | Bedminster Down | | | |
| Richard Rendall | Somerset | | 25 Mar 1784 | | 8 Apr 1784 | Totterdown | | | |
| Thomas Dunsden | Gloucestershire | | 24 Jul 1784 | Capslodge Plain, Wynchwood | 30 Jul 1784 | Capslodge Plain, Wynchwood | | 30 Jul 1784 | |
| Henry Dunsden | Gloucestershire | | 24 Jul 1784 | Capslodge Plain, Wynchwood | 30 Jul 1784 | Capslodge Plain, Wynchwood | | 30 Jul 1784 | |
| John Roberts | Northamptonshire | | 24/2/1785 | | 5 Mar 1785 | Northampton | | | |
| John Price | Oxford | | 2 Mar 1785 | | 7 Mar 1785 | Milton Common | | | |
| James Cliffen | Norfolk | | 17 Mar 1785 | | 24 Mar 1785 | Yaxham-Mattishall parish boundary on Badley Moor | TG022112 52.660735°N 0.988404°E | | |
| John Shilling | Norfolk | | 17 Mar 1786 | Norwich | 25 Mar 1786 | Gallows Hill, Shilling's Field between Burnham Thorpe and North Creake | TF87254004 52.925068°N 0.784134°E | | |
| John Hastings | Hampshire | | 25 Jul 1786 | | 31 Jul 1786 | Hardway, near Gosport | | | |
| Gervaise/Jarvis Matcham | Huntingdonshire | | 29 Jul 1787 | Huntingdon | 2 Aug 1787 | Wolley Road Junction, Alconbury, Cambridgeshire | TL190740 52.35160°N 0.25354°W | 1796 | |
| Abraham Tull | Berkshire | | 7 Mar 1787 | Mortimer Common | 9 Mar 1787 | Mortimer Common | | 9 Mar 1787 | |
| William Hawkins | Berkshire | | 7 Mar 1787 | Mortimer Common | 9 Mar 1787 | Mortimer Common | | 9 Mar 1787 | |
| Edward Lannigan | Surrey | | 2 Apr 1787 | Hindhead Common | 7 Apr 1787 | Hindhead Common | | | |
| James Marshall | Surrey | | 2 Apr 1787 | Hindhead Common | 7 Apr 1787 | Hindhead Common | | | |
| Michael Casey | Surrey | | 2 Apr 1787 | Hindhead Common | 7 Apr 1787 | Hindhead Common | | | |
| John Kennedy | Hertfordshire | | 19 Jul 1787 | | 3 Aug 1787 | Charley Wood Common | | | |
| Thomas Smith | Hertfordshire | | 19 Jul 1787 | | 3 Aug 1787 | Charley Wood Common | | | |
| William Emmanuel | Camarthen | | 2 Aug 1788 | | 9 Aug 1788 | Pembrey Common | | | |
| John Richards/Williams | Devon | | 17 Mar 1788 | Exeter | 24 Mar 1788 | Stoke | | 28 Mar 1788 | |
| William/Richard Smith | Devon | | 17 Mar 1788 | Exeter | 24 Mar 1788 | Stoke | | 28 Mar 1788 | |
| Cornelius Carty | Middlesex | Murder and robbery | 14 Jan 1789 | Burrows Lane, Hendon | Jan 1789 | Four Mile Stone, Edgeware Road | | Jan 1789 | |
| Richard Weldon | Rutland | | 13 Mar 1789 | | 16 Mar 1789 | Hambleton Hill | | | |
| William Weldon | Rutland | | 13 Mar 1789 | | 16 Mar 1789 | Hambleton Hill | | | |
| John Walford | Somerset | | 15 Aug 1789 | | 20 Aug 1789 | Doddington Green | | | |
| John Day | Middlesex | | Unknown | | Sept 1789 | Kennington Common | | | |
| William Saville | Essex | | 8 Mar 1790 | Manuden | 15 Mar 1790 | Manuden | | 15 Mar 1790 | |
| Thomas Jackson | Norfolk | | 12 Mar 1790 | | 19 Mar 1790 | Methwold Common | | | |
| William Jones | Herefordshire | | 29 Jul 1790 | Hereford | 2 Aug 1790 | Longtown Green | | | |
| John Dean | Cheshire | | 31 Aug 1790 | Boughton | 2 Sept 1790 | Stockport Moor | | | |
| James Macnamara | Lancashire | | 14 Aug 1790 | | 11 Sept 1790 | Kersal Moor | | | |
| Henry Lowndes/Clark | Cheshire | | 14 Apr 1791 | Boughton | 21 Apr 1791 | Helsby Tor | | | |
| Ralph Smith | Lincolnshire | | 10 Mar 1792 | | 16 Mar 1792 | Frampton, near murder site | | | |
| William Anthony | Norfolk | | 16 Mar 1792 | Norwich | 24 Mar 1792 | Gibbet Piece, Kettlestone Common | TF96012919 52.824528°N 0.907743°E | | |
| Roger Benstead | Suffolk | | 21 Mar 1792 | Bury St Edmunds | 26 Mar 1792 | Undly Common near Lakenheath | | | |
| Spence Broughton | Yorkshire | | 19 Mar 1792 | York | 14 Apr 1792 | Broughton Lane, Attercliffe | | | |
| William Winter | Northumberland | | 4 Aug 1792 | Newcastle | 10 Aug 1792 | Steng Cross | NY9619890774 55.211196°N 2.06129°W | | |
| John Bettley | Staffordshire | | 14 Mar 1793 | | 20 Mar 1793 | Unknown | | | |
| Richard Ellis | Staffordshire | | 14 Mar 1793 | | 20 Mar 1793 | Unknown | | | |
| John Riddle | Staffordshire | | 14 Mar 1793 | | 20 Mar 1793 | Unknown | | | |
| Francis Martin | Devon | | 18 Mar 1793 | Haldown | 28 Mar 1793 | Brow of Halldown | | 28 Mar 1793 | |
| Edward Howell | Sussex | | 18 Mar 1793 | Horsham | 23 Apr 1793 | Peterdene Lane, near Shoreham | | | |
| James Rook | Sussex | | 18 Mar 1793 | Horsham | 23 Apr 1793 | Peterdene Lane, near Shoreham | | | |
| Edward Miles | Lancashire | | 10 Aug 1793 | Lancaster | 14 Sept 1793 | The Twysters, Manchester Road, Warrington | | | |
| John Nichols | Suffolk | | 19 Mar 1794 | Bury St Edmunds | 26 Mar 1794 | Honington | TL883753 52.3438°N 0.7636°E | | |
| Francis Jennison | Hampshire | | 29 Jul 1794 | Langton Harbour | 4 Aug 1794 | Cumberland Fort | | 4 Aug 1794 | |
| William Butterworth | Hampshire | | 29 Jul 1794 | Langton Harbour | 4 Aug 1794 | Cumberland Fort | | 4 Aug 1794 | |
| Thomas Campion | Devonshire | | 27 Jul 1795 | Bovey Heath | 6 Aug 1795 | Bovey Tracey/Heath | | 6 Aug 1795 | |
| Patrick Quin/Coine | Hampshire | | 29 Jul 1794 | | 16 Aug 1794 | Northwood, Isle of Wight | | | |
| Stephen Watson | Norfolk | | 20 Mar 1795 | Thetford | 25 Mar 1795 | West Bradenham | TF90980847 52.640301°N 0.821145°E | | |
| William Bennington | Norfolk | | 20 Mar 1795 | Thetford | 25 Mar 1795 | West Dereham | | | |
| Jeramiah Abershaw | Surrey | | 27 Jul 1795 | | 3 Aug 1795 | Putney Heath | | | |
| James Scully | Cambridgeshire | | Unknown | | 24 Oct 1795 | Wisbech | | | |
| Michael Quin | Cambridgeshire | | Unknown | | 24 Oct 1795 | Wisbech | | | |
| Thomas Brown | Cheshire | | 4 Apr 1796 | Boughton | 30 Apr 1796 | Mickle Trafford | | | |
| James/John Price | Cheshire | | 4 Apr 1796 | Boughton | 30 Apr 1796 | Mickle Trafford | | | |
| William Suffolk | Norfolk | | 17 Mar 1797 | Norwich | 24 Mar 1797 | Gibbett Loke, North Walsham | | | |
| George Prince | Hampshire | | 18 Jul 1794 | | 23 Jul 1798 | Brook, Bramshaw | | | |
| John Haines | Middlesex | Shooting at officer on Bow Street | 9 Jan 1799 | | Mar 1799 | Hounslow Heath | | | |
| Thomas Clarke | Middlesex | Shooting at officer on Bow Street, other crime in Gloucester | | | Nov 1799 | Hounslow Heath, on Haines's gibbet | | Nov 1799 | |
| Thomas Austin | Kent | | 11 Mar 1799 | | 28 Mar 1799 | Charing Heath | | | |
| Richard Williams | Somerset | | 28 Mar 1799 | Ilton | 1 Apr 1799 | Ilton | | | |
| Robert Drewitt | Sussex | | 25 Mar 1799 | Horsham | 13 Apr 1799 | North Heath Common, near Midhurst | | | |
| William Drewitt | Sussex | | 25 Mar 1799 | Horsham | 13 Apr 1799 | North Heath Common, near Midhurst | | | |

=== 1800–1832 ===
| Offender | Assize county | Sentenced | Place of execution | Executed | Gibbet location | Grid ref. Geo-coordinates | Gibbeted | Ref. |
|---|---|---|---|---|---|---|---|---|
| John Holt | Berkshire | 4 Mar 1800 | | 6 Mar 1800 | Curbridge Common | | | |
| John Deegin | Hampshire | 4 Mar 1800 | | 10 Mar 1800 | Botley | | | |
| James Weldon | Lancashire | 25 Mar 1800 | | 19 Apr 1800 | Barlow Street, Collyhurst | | | |
| James Austin | Kent | Unknown | | 2 Aug 1801 | Bedgebury? | | | |
| John Massey | Leicestershire | 18 Mar 1801 | | 23 Mar 1801 | Congerstone Heath | SK3616304515 52.637184°N 1.467058°W | | |
| David Dutfield | Pembrokeshire | Unknown | | Unknown | Unknown | | | |
| John Palmer | Warwicks | 23 Mar 1801 | | 1 Apr 1801 | Unknown | | | |
| John Gubby | Hampshire | 6 Mar 1804 | | 12 Mar 1804 | East Parley Common | | | |
| Jonathan Harben | Hampshire | 6 Mar 1804 | | 12 Mar 1804 | East Parley Common | | | |
| Thomas Temporel/Otter | Lincolnshire | 8 Mar 1806 | | 14 Mar 1806 | Drinsey Nook | | | |
| William Hove | Staffordshire | 11 Mar 1813 | | 18 Mar 1813 | Gibbet Wood | | | |
| Anthony Lingard | Derbyshire | 22 Mar 1805 | | 28 Mar 1815 | Wardlow | | | |
| John Rolfe | Cambridgeshire | Unknown | | 24 Feb 1823 | Littleport Turnpike | | | |
| William Jobling | Durham | 1 Mar 1832 | | 3 Aug 1832 | Jarrow Slake | | | |
| James Cook | Leicestershire | 4 Aug 1832 | | 10 Aug 1832 | Saffron Lane-Aylestone Road junction | | | |
