= Gibbeting of Stephen Watson =

1795 post-execution display of English murderer

Coordinates: 52.64039°N 0.82122°E

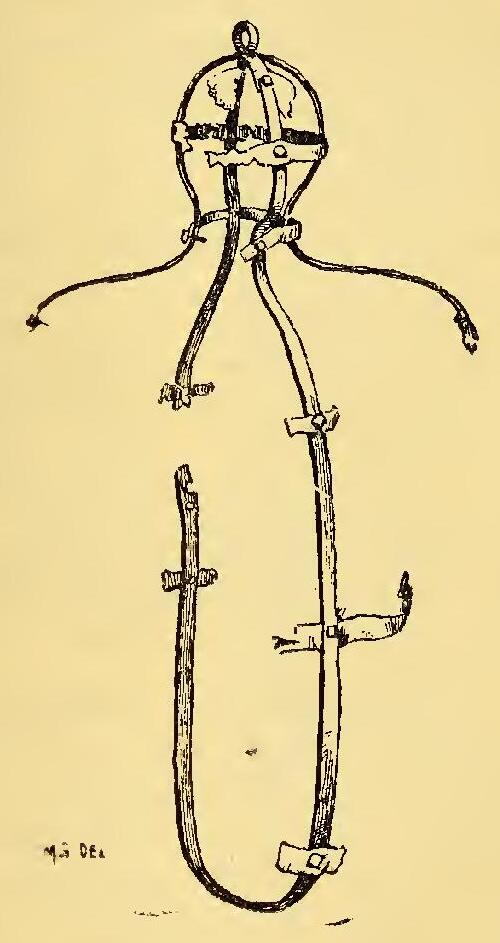
Watson's gibbet iron after being dug up near West Bradenham in the late 19th century. Parts of Watson's skull are depicted in the headpiece.

In 1795 on common land between the parishes of West Bradenham and Holme Hale, the body of the murderer Stephen Watson was gibbeted (displayed in a cage) following his execution by hanging in Thetford alongside another murderer, William Bennington. Watson had been convicted of murder by poisoning his wife at the Norfolk assizes, and as a result was sentenced to death.

The gibbet (TF90980847) remained hanging for at least 42 years, being purportedly taken down temporarily around 8 June 1801 to remove a starling's nest from Watson's breast, and later likely being encountered at night by Reverend Charles Hardy in October 1837. As such, it was the last gibbet to stand in Norfolk. A skull was found there by Reverend H. B. J. Armstrong in 1882. The gibbet was found buried by the novelist H. Rider Haggard in the late 19th century; a significant part of the cage as well as two skull fragments are now held at Norwich Castle Museum.

== Conviction and execution ==
Watson was accused of poisoning his wife, at a parish not far from Thetford. She had given birth a week prior to her murder. He was tried at the Norfolk assize in Thetford, alongside William Bennington who was accused of murdering his master, John Filbee of West Dereham, at another parish not far from the town. Watson was reputedly one of the most hardened criminals to appear before the Court of Justice; The Norfolk Chronicle wrote that "his barborous usage were such that they excited general horror in court". He pleaded innocent persistently. On 20 March 1795, the court sentenced him to death for the "cruelties he inflicted upon the poor unfortunate woman his wife", condemning him to hang from the gallows at Thetford and for his body to be taken back to West Bradenham to be "hung in chains". Bennington was also sentenced to hang.

Watson's execution took place on 25 March 1795. Due to the Murder Act, two days were permitted between sentencing and execution. This was seen as insufficient time for the transportation of Watson and Bennington to the usual location of Castle Hill in Norwich for hanging; festivities that took place on this road risked causing a delay. As such, the decision was taken to execute Bennington and Watson at Thetford rather than the usual Norwich location to retain solemnity for the occasion. The Morning Post at the time reparked that although "an execution had not taken place at Thetford for many years, the propriety of it in the present instance is obvious. The interval allowed in cases of murder between sentence and execution is only 48 hours, which time, had the unhappy men been conveyed to Norwich would have been consumed in festivity on the road instead of being dedicated to penitence and supplication."

== Gibbeting ==
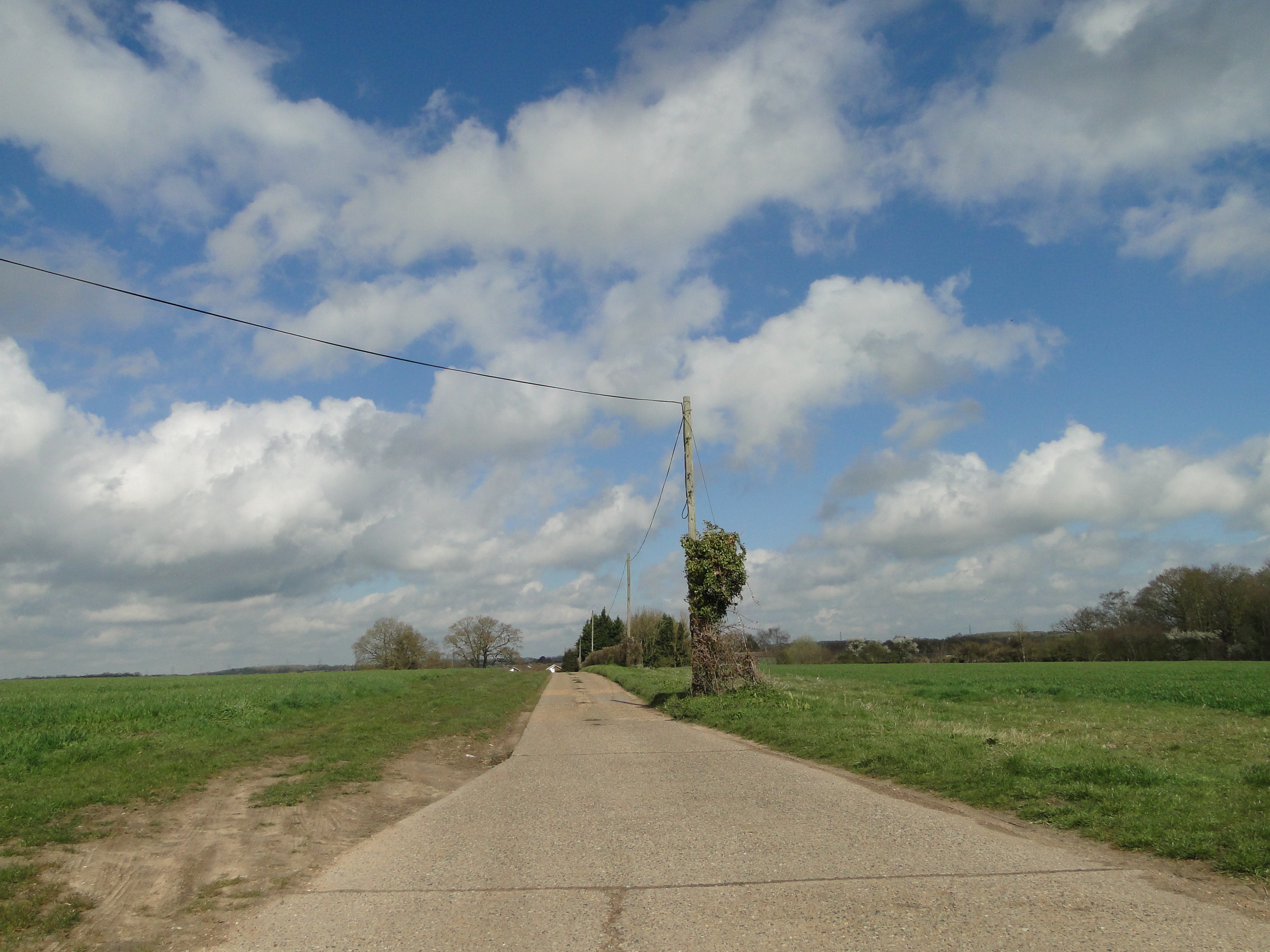
The site of the gibbet in 2019

After he was hung, his body was taken to West Bradenham and he was gibbeted in the middle of common land between the parishes of West Bradenham and Holme Hale. The gibbet was likely fitted by its smith through soldering or welding, leaving scorch marks on Watson's skull in the process. The gibbet appears on William Faden's 1797 map of Norfolk.

Watson's gibbet was temporarily taken down in 1801, around 8 June. This was because, according to Machie’s Norfolk Annal, a starling's nest and its young had to be removed from Watson's breast. This was purportedly watched by an audience of "hundreds of people" from across the county, and it was reported that spectators witnessed this "as something singular and extraordinary". The land was enclosed in 1804; Watson's gibbet was located almost exactly on the parish boundary line fixed during this enclosure.

The Reverend Charles Hardy recounted in his work Social England from eighty years ago to the present jubilee year that in an October in about 1837, when he was driving over West Bradenham Common at night his horse began to "plunge violently" and he heard a "clink, clank" sound above his head, his servant telling him it was the sound of a gibbet swaying in the breeze; this must have been Watson's gibbet which had thus far survived 42 years.

Reverend H. B. J. Armstrong recounted discovering a skull at the site on 20 July 1882. He falsely referred to it as being 100 years old.

=== Excavation ===
Novelist H. Rider Haggard excavated Watson's gibbet cage and part of his skull in the 1890s

By 1899, awareness that a murderer was hung in chains on Bradenham Heath was still present, with a significant additional belief in the false assertion that he had been hung there alive; this was such that the novelist H. Rider Haggard went to excavate the site to find the gibbet cage. The remains of the gibbet, as well as "a portion of the skull of the murderer", were in fact discovered by Haggard. He found that the skull had clear scorch marks, and concluded in his work A Farmer's Year that this was "a mark of the searing of a hot iron", writing that as a result of this evidence Watson could not have been gibbeted alive, as "even during the last century, hot irons would not have been welded onto a living man". While Haggard was correct that Watson was not gibbeted alive, the scorch marks were more likely a result of the welding done to secure the gibbet, not a hot iron.

Norwich Castle Museum holds a significant part of Watson's gibbet cage, as well as two of his skull fragments. It is affected by rust, though features a headpiece with four vertical straps, one of which very likely covered part of Watson's face. It also features a torso consisting of vertical bars continuing from the head piece, and horizontal bands which have largely not survived. The horizontal straps were punched several times, likely to make them adjustable. No arm or leg pieces survive, although the leg pieces were likely attached by a rivet hole in the gusset. The swivel eye is very worn. The skull fragments now have no visible scorch marks, likely due to cleaning they underwent after their acquisition into the museum.

== Sources ==
- Tarlow, Sarah (2017). The Golden and Ghoulish Age of the Gibbet in Britain. London: Palgrave Macmillan UK. pp. 33–78. doi:10.1057/978-1-137-60089-9. ISBN 978-1-137-60088-2.
