= Bradenham =

Bradenham may refer the following places in England:

- Bradenham, Buckinghamshire
- Bradenham, Norfolk
