= Knobstick =

Knobstick may refer to:

- Strikebreaker or blackleg, a derogatory archaic term for a worker who is not part of a union and works when others are striking
- A weapon, a short stick with a knob at the top traditionally used by the indigenous peoples of South Africa. From the Afrikaans knopkierie
- The Knobstick, an 1893 novel by C. Allen Clarke

== See also ==
- Knobstick wedding, a forced marriage of a pregnant single woman with the man known or believed to be the father
