= Rosie Curston's Meadow, Mattishall =

Protected area in Norfolk, England

Coordinates: 52.669°N 1.017°E

- Site of Special Scientific Interest
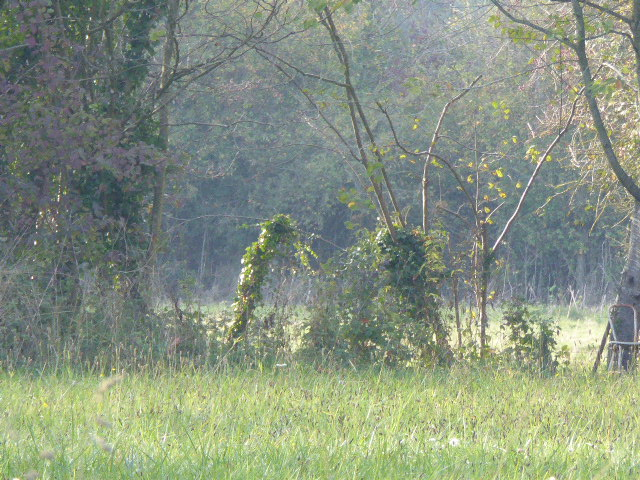
- Location of Rosie Curston's Meadow, Mattishall.
- Area of search: Norfolk
- Grid reference: TG 041 122
- Interest: Biological
- Area: 2.3 hectares (5.7 acres)
- Notification date: 1994
- Location map: Magic Map

Rosie Curston's Meadow is a 2.3-hectare (5.7-acre) biological Site of Special Scientific Interest in Mattishall in Norfolk, England.

This unimproved calcareous clay meadow is managed by cattle grazing. It has over sixty grass species and a rich variety of herbs, including green-winged orchid, adder's tongue, bee orchid, twayblade and yellow rattle.

The site is private land with no public access.
