= Dekichatta kekkon =

Japanese slang term for marriage due to pregnancy

In Japan, the slang term dekichatta kekkon (出来ちゃった結婚), or dekikon (デキコン) for short, emerged in the late 1990s. The term can literally be translated as "oops-we-did-it-marriage," implying an unintended pregnancy (and is therefore analogous to the English phrase "shotgun wedding"). A quarter of all Japanese brides are pregnant at the time of their wedding, according to the Health Labor and Welfare Ministry, and pregnancy is one of the most common motivations for marriage. The prevalence and celebrity profile of dekichatta-kon has inspired Japan's wedding industry to introduce an even more benign phrase, sazukari-kon (授かり婚; blessed wedding).

== Notable individuals ==
Notable celebrities with these marriages include Namie Amuro, Yōko Oginome, Hitomi Furuya, Ami Suzuki, Kaori Iida, Nozomi Tsuji, Anna Tsuchiya, Meisa Kuroki, Leah Dizon, Melody Miyuki Ishikawa, Riisa Naka and Rie Miyazawa.

TV personality and news presenter Christel Takigawa announced her plan to marry Japanese politician Shinjiro Koizumi on August 7, 2019. Five months later, their first child was born in January 2020, and Koizumi subsequently took paternity leave. As the couple announced the pregnancy during the marriage announcement, they were accused of having a shotgun wedding. Some commentators defended the couple, pointing to pressures for Koizumi to marry and for Takigawa to have children, that may have prompted the announcement. Because the child was born less than 200 days following the couple's wedding in August, and was thus conceived before the marriage, Koizumi is not listed as the father in the birth registry, as per Japanese Civil Code.

== See also ==
- Shotgun wedding
- Forced marriage
- Knobstick wedding
- Premarital sex
- Oklahoma!, a play where one character, Ali Hakim, is forcibly coerced towards marriage on two occasions.
- Marriage of convenience
