= Gibbeting of Tom Otter =

British murderer (1735–1806)

Tom Otter
- Born: 1782
- Died: 14 March 1806 (aged 23–24); Lincoln Gaol
- Cause of death: Hanging
- Resting place: Gibbetted on Saxilby Moor
- Other name: Thomas Temporel
- Occupation: Navvy
- Known for: Murder of Mary Kirkham
- Criminal charges: Murder
- Criminal penalty: Execution

Tom Otter, also known as Thomas Temporel, was a British murderer who on 3 November 1805, at Drinsey Nook in Lincolnshire, killed his pregnant wife, Mary (née Kirkham) who he had married the same day in a likely knobstick wedding. Otter was sentenced to death by hanging on 14 March 1806. His body was gibbeted 100 yards (91 m) from where Mary's body had been found, which was a highly popular event resembling a fair.

The gibbet remained for 46 years until it was blown down during a storm in 1850; its headpiece and a leg brace survives in a private collection at Doddington Hall. Otter's life and death has been the subject of multiple pieces of local folklore.

== Early life and career ==
Otter was born in Treswell, a village in Nottinghamshire, in 1782. He married Martha Rawlinson in Treswell in 1804, with his daughter being christened at Hockerton the same year. He began navvying work on the canals of Lincoln in 1805, at the time being known as Thomas Temporel, this surname being his mother's maiden name. In Lincoln he met a local woman, Mary Kirkham, who also became pregnant. As a result of a need to avoid illegitimacy and a requirement to support unmarried mothers and bastard children on parish relief, he was compelled to marry Kirkham.

== Marriage to and murder of Mary Kirkham ==
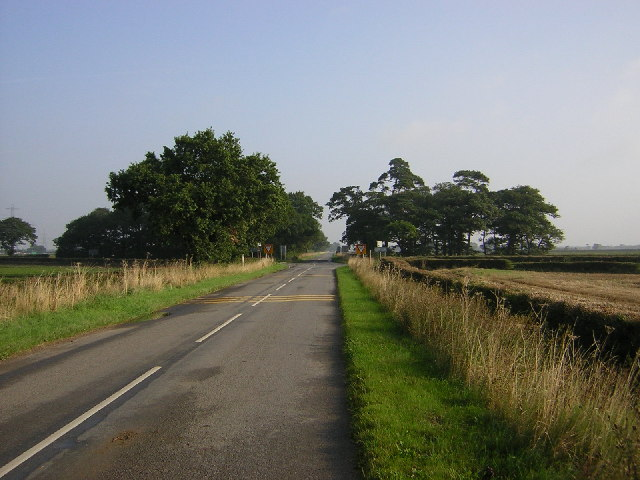
The scene of the murder, now known as Tom Otter's Lane

Kirkham was about 8 months pregnant at the time of the wedding on 3 November 1805. The marriage at South Hykeham was witnessed by Overseers of the Poor for that parish, William and John Shuttleworth, and as such it was likely a knobstick wedding. On the same 3 November, when the couple were returning to Doddington where Thomas lived, he attacked Mary with a hedge stake, killing her at Drinsey Nook.

The following day, Thomas was arrested and taken to Lincoln Castle, whereas Mary's body was moved to the local Sun Inn in Saxilby for post-mortem examination. Following this, her body was buried in the north-east corner of Saxilby's churchyard.

== Trial and execution ==
Otter's trial took place during the March assizes of 1806. His guilt was never in doubt during the trial, and he was sentenced to death and dissection, in accordance with the Murder Act 1752. Prior to the judge leaving town, however, the post-mortem section of the sentence was changed to hanging in chains. A gibbet cage was measured for Otter, an experience upon which "all his fortitude appeared to forsake him", and he was hanged at Lincoln Gaol on 14 March.

== Gibbeting ==
Following Otter's execution, his body was covered in a layer of pitch before being dressed and placed in his gibbet cage. His body was then transported to Saxilby Moor, about 100 yards (91 m) from the place where Mary's body had been discovered, where the cage was hung on a pole 30 feet (9.1 m) high. A very large crowd formed to see this event, and this gathering continued for days afterward. One source states that the gibbeting "inaugurated a week of merry-making of the most unseemly character. Booths were pitched near the gibbet, and great numbers of the people came to see the wretch suspended". According to an eyewitness account the gathering was "just like a fair", and according to another, "For several days after the event, the vicinity of the gibbet resembled a country fair with drinking booths, ballad singers, Gypsy fiddlers, and fortune-tellers".

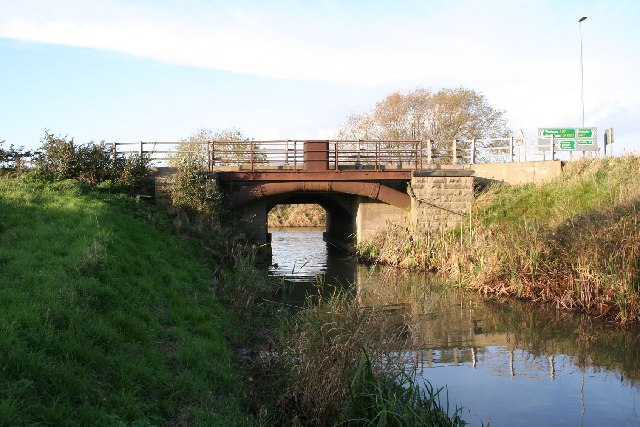
Tom Otter's Bridge in 2005

The gibbet stayed suspended as Otter's remains slowly decayed and fell away. The road on which the gibbet stood was named Tom Otter's Lane, and this now leads to Tom Otter's Bridge. Next to this to the south-east are Gibbet Wood and the Gibbet lane cottages, as well as Gibbetwood Farm, all named after Otter's gibbet.

In 1850, 46 years after the gibbet was first hung up, a violent storm caused the gibbet cage to fall. The lord of the manor Edwin George Jarvis wrote in his notebook that he obtained the headpiece of the gibbet, but that "the gypsies made off with nearly all the remains", likely for scrap metal value. The headpiece as of 2017 resided at Doddington Hall, which was as of 2017 is home to Jarvis's descendant Claire Birch. It consists of a solid and substantial iron piece and features three arms bent into a head shape and bolted to a heavy hinged collar. Its top is reinforced using a bolted-on plate, and its hook passes through a central hole. Doddington Hall also retains a leg brace from the gibbet.

== Folklore ==
Otter has been the subject of multiple pieces of local folklore and false stories, all of which can be traced back to a story published by the Lincoln Times by Thomas Miller in 1859. A covering letter from Miller to the Lincoln Times makes clear that the stories are intended as fiction. These stories are more recently perpetuated on the internet.

One of these legends describes without evidence that Otter's gibbet fell from its post twice, and that this second fall killed a man whom, earlier, had taunted Otter. Another story claims that on each anniversary of Kirkham's murder, the hedge stake murder weapon disappeared from the wall of the Peeweet Inn (now Pyewipe Inn), instead appearing bloody in the field where she died. An extension of this legend claims that a group of men attempted to watch for its appearance, but all fell asleep simultaneously and missed the moving of the stake. The story purportedly ended when the Bishop of Lincoln burned the stake outside Lincoln Cathedral, stilling it. Another false claim is that he murdered his baby, and that the Sun Inn where Mary's body was taken for inquest is haunted by the ghost cries of Otter’s baby. Further general ghosts of Drinsey Nook are a regular subject for paranormal interest groups and ghost tours in the area.

In 1976, a play at the Lincolnshire Show was being staged to commemorate the murder by students of the Bishop Grossesteste College. This play was based on the trial records, a broadsheet about Otter's confession on the gallows, as well as parish registers and local folklore.
