= Shotgun wedding =

Wedding following premarital pregnancy

A shotgun wedding is a wedding arranged in response to a pregnancy. The phrase comes from the figurative imagining that the relatives of the pregnant bride threaten the reluctant male groom with a shotgun in order to ensure that he marries the woman.

== Rationale ==
One purpose of such a wedding can be to get recourse from the man for the act of impregnation; another reason is trying to ensure that the child is raised by both parents. In some cases, as in the early United States and in the Middle East, a major objective was restoring the social honor of the mother. The practice is a loophole method of preventing the birth of illegitimate children or, if the marriage occurs early enough in the gestation period, to conceal the fact that conception had already occurred prior to marriage.

In some societies, the stigma attached to pregnancy out of wedlock can be enormous, and coercive means (in spite of the legal defense of undue influence) for gaining recourse are often seen as the prospective father-in-law's "right". Often, a couple will arrange a shotgun wedding without explicit outside encouragement, and some religious groups consider it a moral imperative to marry in that situation.

== By culture ==
=== West Asia ===
Premarital sexual relations remain taboo across all social strata throughout the Islamic and Arab world. In many cases, fornication is illegal and even a criminal offence under Sharia law. Even when it is not, the social response can be extreme, especially against women who have lost their virginity prior to marriage.

In Arabian culture, shotgun weddings serve to obscure the fact that a baby was conceived prior to marriage. When that proves impossible, the social standing of the couple involved is irreparably damaged. Nevertheless, shotgun weddings help prevent the individuals involved, especially the women, from becoming social pariahs.

Apart from instances of regional slang, there is no universal, specific term for "shotgun weddings" in Arabic. This is because they are not recognised as a regular social phenomenon and because a successfully conducted Middle Eastern shotgun wedding is generally unknown to the guests. In some Persian Gulf nations, the term "police station marriage" (Arabic: زواج مخفر) may be the closest colloquial analogue for the concept of a "shotgun wedding".

=== East Asia ===
Marriages preceded by pregnancy by age in Japan (2010).

- In Japan, the slang term dekichatta kekkon (出来ちゃった結婚), or dekikon (デキコン) for short, emerged in the late 1990s. The term can literally be translated as 'oops-we-did-it-marriage', implying an unintended pregnancy. A quarter of all Japanese brides are pregnant at the time of their wedding, according to the Health Labor and Welfare Ministry, and pregnancy is one of the most-common motivations for marriage. The prevalence and celebrity profile of dekichatta-kon has inspired Japan's wedding industry to introduce an even more benign phrase, sazukari-kon (授かり婚; blessed wedding).
- In China, the term 奉子成婚 (pinyin: fèngzǐchénghūn; lit. 'married by the order of the child') means that the couple married because conception occurred outside of marriage. It is a pun on the phrase 奉旨成婚 (pinyin: fèngzhǐchénghūn; lit. 'married by an imperial edict order'). It is becoming increasingly common among China's youngest generation. However, in the same age group, there is objection and criticism to such a practice.
- In South Korea, the slang term 속도위반 (RR: sokdowiban; literally: 'speeding over the limit') refers to the situation in which the pregnancy preceded the marriage.
- In Vietnam, the term bác sĩ bảo cưới (literally meaning 'because the doctor said so') is often used with humorous intention.

=== Southeast Asia ===
- The Philippines has a shotgun wedding tradition (Tagalog: pikot) where a man is forced to marry a woman for various reasons. Although the most common ground is impregnation, another variant of this practise include the woman's parents forcing marriage on the man to their daughter due to his social status or wealth, rather than his desire to marry her for love; this occurs even if the former did not penetrate the latter. Weapons may or may not be used in coercion, but other means include litigation, particularly when the woman's family threatens to file rape and lascivious acts charges against the man.
- Indonesia has a similar condition with the Philippines; this is usually called "married by accident".

=== Europe ===
Following the sexual revolution beginning in the 1960s, the concepts of love, sexuality, procreation and marriage began to separate after being intimately entangled in social consciousness for centuries. However, sexual practice had not always followed social convention, resulting in shotgun or Knobstick weddings.

- In the United Kingdom, one source reports that almost 40% of all brides were pregnant in 1850.
- In Denmark, a 1963 study found that 50% of all brides were pregnant.
- In the Netherlands and Belgium, the Dutch term moetje was a commonly used euphemism for marriage resulting from unintended pregnancy. The noun is formed from imperative of the verb moeten ('must', 'to have to') with the added suffix -je, indicating a diminutive. Thus, it might be translated as a 'little must' or a 'little you-have-to', i.e. one is compelled to marry to avoid the shame of giving birth out of wedlock.
  Moetjes were a common occurrence in Belgium and the Netherlands during the first half of the 20th century. In the early 1960s, about a quarter of all marriages in the Netherlands were shotgun marriages; however, in some areas, up to 90% of the brides were pregnant. By the late 2000s, the practice had become so rare that the term was growing obsolete. According to a 2013 by the Centrum voor Leesonderzoek, the word moetje was recognised by 82.5% of the Dutch and 43.1% of the Flemish.
- In Spain shotgun weddings are called casarse de penalty in Spanish or casar-se de penal in Catalan (lit. 'marry by penalty'), in which language also the expression fer Pasqua abans de Rams (lit. 'to celebrate Easter before Palm Sunday', or 'to put the cart before the horse') is widely used.

=== North America ===
In the United States and Canada, the use of duress or violent coercion to marry is no longer common, although many anecdotal stories and folk songs record instances of such coercion in 18th- and 19th-century America and Canada. Pressure to marry immediately due to pregnancy has become less common as the stigma associated with out-of-wedlock births has declined and the number of such births has increased. As a result, the typical, voluntary wedding during pregnancy might be more neutrally termed a mid-pregnancy marriage. Mid-pregnancy weddings are common enough that many suppliers of both bridal gowns and maternity clothing sell wedding dresses that fit during the later stages of pregnancy.

While a 2016 study suggests that couples who wed while pregnant do not necessarily have an increased risk of subsequent divorce, another study by Duke University from that same year demonstrated that, among whites, divorce rates increased from 19% for non-pregnant brides to 30%.

== In popular culture ==
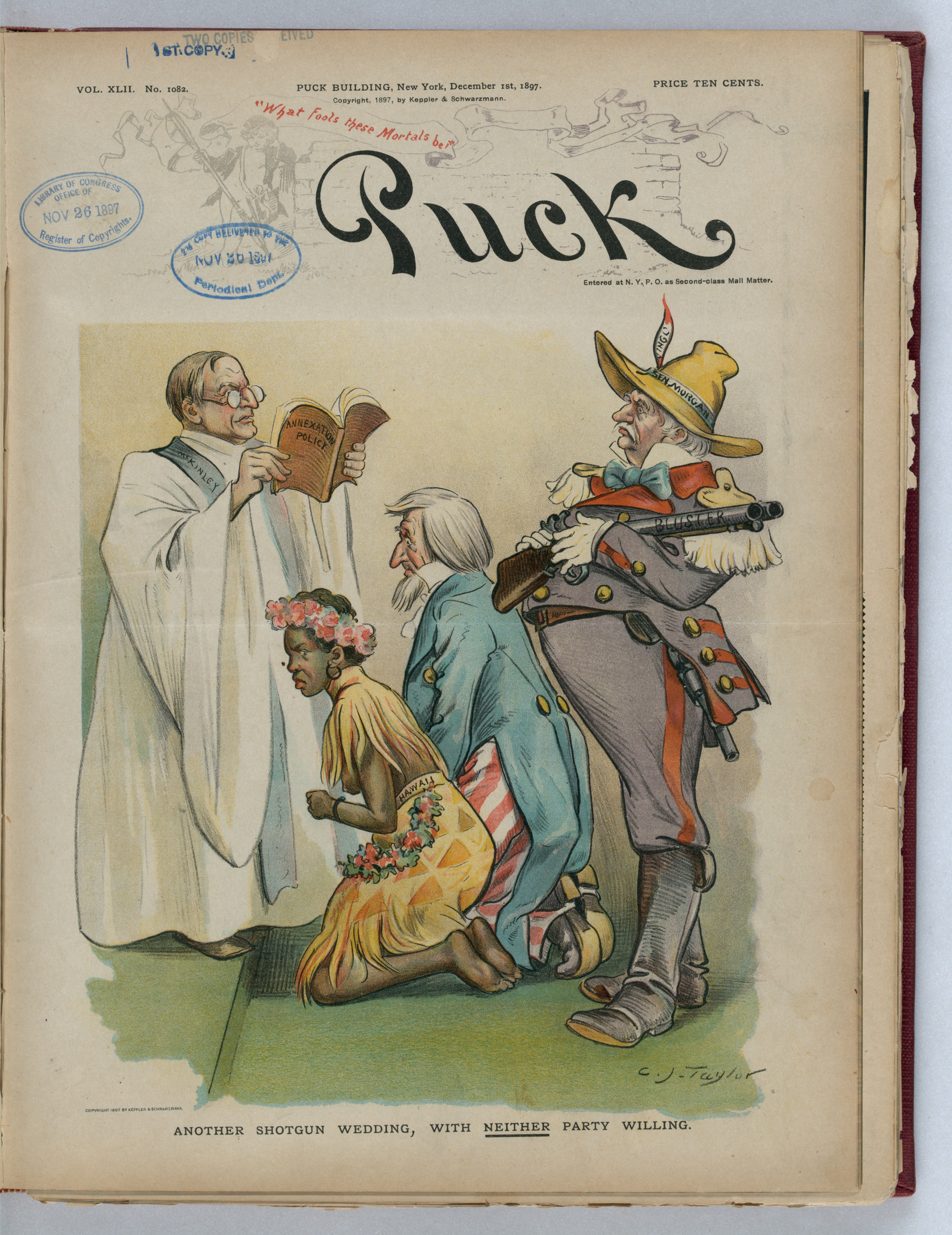
This 1897 political cartoon portrays the American annexation of Hawaii as "Another shotgun wedding, with neither party willing".

=== Films ===
- Acht Mädels im Boot (1932), German musical film
- Eight Girls in a Boat (1934), American feature film, refilming of Acht Mädels im Boot
- Nightmare Alley (1947), American carnival noir
- Seven Brides for Seven Brothers (1954)
- Jenny, first Dutch fullcolour feature film, refilming of Acht Mädels im Boot
- A Kind of Loving (1962), British feature film
- Girl with Green Eyes (1964), Irish feature film
- Ride with the Devil (1999) Confederate Bushwaker film.
- Shotgun Wedding (2022), American feature film

=== Books ===
- The Lonely Girl (1962), Irish novel on which Girl with Green Eyes is based

== See also ==
- Cohabitation
- Forced marriage
- Knobstick wedding
- Marry-your-rapist law
- Premarital sex
- Oklahoma!, a play where one character, Ali Hakim, is forcibly coerced towards marriage on two occasions.
- Marriage of convenience
