= St Mary's Church, East Bradenham =

Coordinates: 52.6389°N 0.8522°E

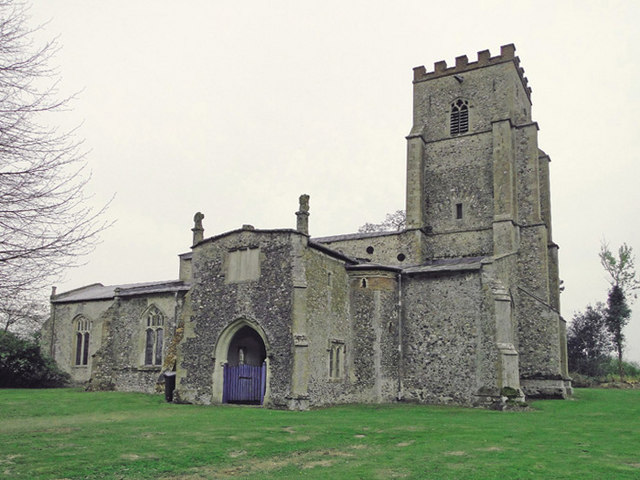
- St Mary's Church, East Bradenham, from the northwest

- Location in Norfolk
- OS grid reference: TF 931 084
- Location: Bradenham, Norfolk
- Country: England
- Denomination: Anglican
- Website: Churches Conservation Trust

Architecture
- Functional status: Redundant
- Heritage designation: Grade I
- Designated: 23 June 1960
- Architectural type: Church
- Style: Gothic

Specifications
- Materials: Flint and brick

St Mary's Church, East Bradenham, is a redundant Anglican church in the village of Bradenham, Norfolk, England. It is recorded in the National Heritage List for England as a designated Grade I listed building, and is under the care of the Churches Conservation Trust. The church stands at the east end of the village.

== History ==
The church dates from the 14th century, with additions and alterations in the 15th and 19th centuries.

== Architecture ==
=== Exterior ===
St Mary's is constructed in flint with dressings in ashlar and brick. The roofs are lead. Its plan consists of a four-bay nave with a clerestory, north and south aisles, a north porch, a chancel, and a west tower flanked by the aisles. The tower dates from the 14th and 15th centuries. Its style is Perpendicular. It is in three stages, has angle buttresses and a battlemented parapet. On the west side is a doorway, over which is a 19th-century three-light window. In the top stage are two-light Perpendicular bell openings. In the west walls of both aisles are two-light windows. The north porch is in two storeys, and to its west is a stair turret. On its north side is an arched doorway, with a three-light window above, and on the east and west sides is a two-light window. On its summit are finials consisting of mutilated figures. On the north side of the church are two two-light windows, and the east wall of the north aisle contains a three-light window. The windows in the south aisle are similar, plus a 14th-century doorway. In the clerestory on both sides are six round 14th-century windows with quatrefoil tracery. On both sides at the east ends of the clerestory is a three-light window. The chancel has, on both sides, four two-light windows and a priest's door, the door on the south side being blocked. The east window dates from the 19th century and has three lights.

=== Interior ===
Inside the church are 14th-century four-bay arcades with octagonal piers. There are piscinae in the south aisle and the chancel. Also in the south aisle is a medieval altar slab. The octagonal font dates from the 14th century with a 17th-century cover. There is a monument in the chancel to John Greene and his wife, dated 1684. Also in the church is a Rococo-style monument dated 1750 to Gisbon Lucas. The organ was built in 1786 by Samuel Green of London for Huntingfield Hall, Norfolk. It was moved into the church in 1883. Repairs were undertaken in 1892 by Norman and Beard. In 1940 the organ was moved to its present position from the south wall of the chancel. It was granted a Historic Organ Certificate in 1999, and plans are in hand for it to be restored.

== See also ==
- List of churches preserved by the Churches Conservation Trust in the East of England
