= James Cliffen =

British murderer (died 1785)

- Died: 24 March 1785; Norwich Castle Hill
- Cause of death: Hanging
- Resting place: Gibbetted on Yaxley-Mattishall parish boundary
- Occupation: Footpad
- Known for: Murder of Peter Seamen
- Criminal charges: Murder
- Criminal penalty: Execution

James Cliffen (died 24 March 1785) was a British footpad and murderer who killed Peter Seamen while robbing him and his brother Henry Seamen in Yaxham, Norfolk in January 1785. He was found guilty on 21 March that year before being executed at Norwich Castle Hill on 24 March and then gibbeted at the parish boundary between Yaxham and Mattishall for around 25 years.

== Murder of Peter Seamen ==
In January 1785, the footpad James Cliffen conducted a violent robbery on a footpath at Yaxham, Norfolk, near Yaxham Road, against the brothers Peter and Henry Seamen, both of whom were elderly. Prior to taking their valuables, he "knocked them both down". He then beat them, likely with a blunt instrument. He then left them to die. Whereas Henry Seamen recovered from his wounds, Peter died shortly after the attack.

On 17 March 1785, Cliffen was brought before the Norfolk Assizes at Thetford, persistently arguing for his innocence. He was found guilty of the wilful murder of Seamen in Yaxham on 21 March.

== Execution and gibbeting ==
On 24 March 1785, though he continually pleaded that he was innocent, he was executed on Castle Hill in Norwich. The Times commented that he "appeared quite hardened and very indifferent about his unhappy situation", and Parson Woodforde wrote that he had "behaved most daringly audacious" while at the scaffold.

Following the execution, his body was then conveyed to Dereham, and then to Badley Moor, where he was "hung in chains" and left to decompose on the parish boundary between Yaxham and Mattishall (TG022112), on a gibbet that measured 33 feet (10 m) in height. This gibbet was made by Samuel Banham and cost 8 pounds and 16 shillings. Reputedly, hundreds of people came to see Cliffen gibbeted; Badley Moor resembled a fair for several weeks after his death. On Sundays during this time, booths were erected for the sale of alcohol, which reportedly caused "very hilarious scenes". Parson Woodforde wrote in his diary that on 4 April 1785, "it being fine weather", he rode "to Baddeley Moor where Cliffen stands in Chains."

The gibbet and Cliffen's remains were a local landmark for around 25 years, visible across the moor and on William Faden's 1797 map of the county. It remained until enclosure, the privatisation of the parish's common land, led to its removal the same year as that enclosure took place. Cliffen's body was buried around 50 years after his gibbeting, though five years after this his bones were ploughed up and his skull passed into private possession.

The headpiece of Cliffen's iron gibbet cage survives only, and as of 2014 was on display at Norwich Castle Museum. It is made up of two bars crossed and bent into a cage with four vertical bars, one of which is cut short to allow the display of Cliffen's face and the others being attached to a hinged collar. There is a swivel eye on top.

== Sources ==
- Durston, Gregory J (2017). Fields, Fens, and Felonies: Crime and Justice in Eighteenth-Century East Anglia. Waterside Press. ISBN 978-1-909976-11-5.
