= A Farmer's Year =

A Farmer's Year: Being His Commonplace Book for 1898
- First edition
- Author: H. Rider Haggard
- Language: English
- Publisher: Longmans, Green, and Co.
- Publication date: 1899
- Publication place: United Kingdom

A Farmer's Year: Being His Commonplace Book for 1898 is a non-fiction book by H Rider Haggard.

It was written as a serial for Longman's Magazine.
