= Yaxley =

Yaxley may refer to:

- Yaxley (surname)
- Yaxley, Cambridgeshire (historically in Huntingdonshire), near Peterborough, England
  - Yaxley F.C. a football club in Yaxley, Cambridgeshire
- Yaxley, Suffolk, near Eye, England
- Lord Yaxley, a minor fictional character in the Jeeves novels of P. G. Wodehouse, see Bertie Wooster
- Corban Yaxley, a death eater in J. K. Rowling's book Harry Potter and the Deathly Hallows
- Yaxley, a town in Felipe Carrillo Puerto Municipality, Quintana Roo, Mexico
