= Gibbeting of John Haines and Thomas Clarke =

1799 post-execution display of English highwaymen

The gibbeting of John Haines and Thomas Clarke took place in March and November 1799 on Hounslow Heath, in what was then Middlesex. Haines (also written as Haynes), a notorious highwayman, was executed in March and gibbeted at the site of the crime for shooting at Bow Street police officers, and Clarke, his accomplice, was gibbeted on the same site seven months later after being convicted of a different crime in Gloucester, forming a double gibbet. The gibbet was the last to be erected in London, standing for five years, and saw a significant amount of controversy concerning its placement on the Heath.

== Conviction and decision of gibbeting site ==
Haines was a notorious highwayman. He was convicted of shooting at Bow Street police officers, who were patrolling Hounslow Heath.

Haines's accomplice, Thomas Clark, was also considered guilty of the crime, though was not yet sentenced to death. Haines, however, was sentenced to death on 9 January 1799, and King George III personally sanctioned the execution and gibbeting of Haines at the Recorder's Report. While Bow Street requested that he should be gibbeted at the site of the crime, the Home Office was highly uncertain as the practice of hanging in chains around London had become unusual, and thus sought the advice of law officers. Lord Chancellor Eldon, the Attorney General, advised the government on this issue. This resulted in the issuing of a warrant allowing the gibbeting to go ahead in that location, though a private communication to the sheriffs noted that it would be "desirable that a Spot should be chosen [...] remote from the Windsor Road." This was likely communicated so as to avoid the King being troubled by the sight of Haines's decaying corpse while travelling between London and Windsor Castle.

== Gibbeting of Haines ==
Haines was executed in March. His gibbet was erected on Hounslow Heath, Middlesex. At the time, the area was gentrifying though the gibbet site had not yet been developed.

The gibbet location, on "the most public road in the kingdom", was controversial, and prompted recurring expressions of dismay in the London papers for over a month. One London newspaper, the Whitehall Evening Post, criticised Haines's gibbet for being "shamefully placed close to the high road". This was echoed by the Oracle and Daily Advertiser, which put forward that its only effect was "to frighten women and poison travellers". Reports claimed that the gibbet had been seen by well-to-do coach passengers and, in one account, young boys at a nearby boarding school. The Morning Post and Advertiser reported that the royal family had begun travelling by a different road to avoid seeing the gibbet. However, another paper, the Morning Herald, claimed that "so far from being offensively situated, [it] is placed at the distance of at least five hundred yards from the high road", also noting that it was not in sight of any house. This latter claim is possibly dubious as the Morning Chronicle reported that on the night of 16 March 1799, Haines's body, still inside the gibbet irons, had been blown from the gibbet into a nearby house's garden. However, this itself is improbable as a new gibbet was unlikely to have been so weak.

== Gibbeting of Clarke ==
Haines's accomplice Thomas Clarke was later convicted of a separate crime at the Gloucester assizes. Clarke was recognised for his equal guilt in the crime on Hounslow Heath, and as such was gibbeted on the same heath seven months after Haines, in November. This received similarly negative reactions; one paper commented in February 1800, with sarcasm, that "The neighbourhoods of Hounslow, Feltham-hill, and Belfont have the double gibbet of Haines and Clarke to embellish their rural prospects!" and declared it to be "unquestionably, a nuisance of the highest magnitude." The property on which the gibbet stood was enclosed soon after this, and residential housing was built in the area. This led to a petition from prominent resident Sir William Gibbons in July 1804, arguing that more houses could be built "if so disagreeable an Object was removed". He made use of his status as a man who had been robbed five times on Hounslow Heath in 1798 alone despite the presence of gibbets to make the case that gibbets did not work to deter crime:

[T]he Owner of the Land suffers much in his Crops of Corn by Passengers from curiosity treading them down, and the Proprietors of the Houses already built complain of the Nuisance. [...] The effect of Terror is over, I believe, as the only Robbery committed in the neighbourhood for some time was on the High Road exactly opposite to the Gibbet.

In response, the government responded by ordering the Sheriffs to "cause the Bodies of [...] Haynes and Clark to be removed from Hounslow Heath and to be Gibbeted on some convenient spot within” the county, “or otherwise disposed of as You shall think proper." There is no evidence of reports that Haines and Clarke were hung anywhere else, meaning their bodies likely met the latter fate. The double-gibbet thus stood for five years, and was the last gibbet to be erected in London.
