= Gibbeting of William Hawkins and Abraham Tull =

1787 post-execution display of English murderers

On 9 March 1787, two English murderers, William Hawkins and Abraham Tull, from Ufton Nervet, Berkshire, were gibbeted at a crossroads on a common between Mortimer, Padworth, and Ufton after their execution there the same day. Hawkins was around 19 and Tull was 17. The pair had on 2 February murdered William Billimore, an elderly labourer from Stratfield Mortimer, while attempting to rob him. They were tried for the crime at the Berkshire assizes beginning 7 March 1787, where they were sentenced to death by hanging.

Their gibbeting took place on the same day after their execution. The gibbets were removed from their original location under order from a wealthy woman from Wokefield Park. Only a single leg piece of one of the gibbet cages remains, though it is unclear whether this was Hawkins's or Tull's. It resides with Reading Museum.

== Murder of William Billimore ==
On 2 February 1787, two teenagers William Hawkins and Abraham Tull, from Ufton Nervet, killed William Billimore, an elderly labourer from Stratfield Mortimer on a common between Mortimer, Padworth, and Ufton, in an effort to obtain money for spending at the Reading Fair. They used a lead weighted club to do so, stealing his pocket watch while failing to obtain any money. They sold the pocket watch after escaping to Maidenhead, though were apprehended there and held in Reading's County Gaol at Castle Street.

== Trial and execution ==
On 7 March 1787, the Berkshire assizes at which Hawkins and Tull were tried began; their case may have been heard on this date or on 8 March. Their sentencing was given by Sir Nash Grose; he ordered their execution on Mortimer Common, Berkshire, which was nearby the location where the murder was committed, for the next Friday. He also ordered for them to be hung in chains; gibbeted.

The pair were teenagers at the time of their execution, with Tull being around 19 and Hawkins being 17. For Tull's transport from the gaol to his execution, Tull's father, sister, brother-in-law a cousin were permitted to ride with him in the cart and give him comfort publicly. Hawkins had an extensive goodbye with his own parents, which was reported as "truly distressing". On 9 March, on a common between Mortimer, Padworth, and Ufton, frequently referred to as Mortimer Common, either one or two days after the hearing of their case, Tull and Hawkins were executed for the murder.

== Gibbeting ==
On the same day, the pair were gibbeted on the same common where they were executed, at Round Oak, near a crossroads. The total cost of their execution and gibbeting was, according to the sheriff's cravings, £60 8s 9d.

Later, one Mrs Brocas of Beaurepaire, a wealthy woman who lived at Wokefield Park, expressed that the sight of Hawkins and Tull's gibbet cages "greatly distressed" her whenever she rode past them, and thus privately ordered the removal and burial of the gibbets which was carried out.

The only part of the gibbet cages that have been recovered is a single leg piece, of either Hawkins or Tull's cage. It consists of iron hoops onto which two straight iron strips are fastened on either side. The hoops are curved and flanged, and it would have been possible to tighten them around the leg's circumference. An attachment remains which was for a foot piece. This leg piece is with Reading Museum.

== Sources ==
- Tarlow, Sarah (1 December 2014). "The Technology of the Gibbet". International Journal of Historical Archaeology. 18 (4). doi:10.1007/s10761-014-0275-0. ISSN 1092-7697. PMC 4372825. PMID 25834380.
