= Murder of Grace Bennet =

1694 murder

- Location: Calverton Manor, Calverton, Buckinghamshire, England
- Date: 19 September 1694
- Deaths: 1
- Victim: Grace Bennet
- Perpetrator: Adam Barnes
- Motive: Theft
- Verdict: Guilty
- Convictions: Murder
- Convicted: 1

The murder of Grace Bennet was committed by Adam Barnes at her and her husband Simon Bennet's manor house, Calverton Manor in Calverton, Buckinghamshire on 19 September 1694.

== Background ==
Little knowledge of Grace Bennet can be fully verified as almost all of it originates from others' comments in letters, lawsuits, memoirs and histories. Her husband Simon Bennet renovated their Tudor mansion at Calverton, Buckinghamshire in 1659. She had two daughters of important political and social rank; Frances who was Countess of Salisbury and wife of the 4th Earl of Salisbury James Cecil, and Grace who was the wife of Member of Parliament John Bennet. This makes Bennet's murder unusual as she was not an isolated widow and as murder rates were declining in the late 17th century. She may have been the only woman relative of a peer to be murdered in the seventeenth century.

By 1694 the mansion and its fields were neglected after Simon's death, and Bennet had gained a reputation as a rich recluse; according to a contemporary pamphlet she had an estimated income of £4,000 per year, and was rumoured to have only spent £100 of this, allegedly surrounding herself with gold and silver as well as stocks of corn she could sell in times of scarcity. There is little historical evidence for any closeness with her family. Works about Bennet paint her as a strong-minded, independent woman who began life anxious and became angry and vindictive as she became older.

Barnes was a butcher from Stony Stratford, three miles from Calverton.

== Murder ==
On 19 September 1694 at about 9am, Barnes walked the three miles from Stony Stratford to Calverton Manor. He found Bennet alone in the servants' hall of the house and broke her neck, killing her. One contemporary account stated that the manner of death was so severe that "her face turned behind her." Other stories of her death claimed that she was hit on the head or had her throat cut.

At 11am, a thresher of Bennet's saw Barnes climbing over the garden wall at the house's rear and allegedly cried out, "How Now Friend! What have you been robbing my lady’s house?" Barnes denied the accusation, though he gave the thresher a half crown so he would remain silent. Barnes was later found drinking in the alehouse and was identified by the thresher. While he was supposedly arrested with 300 guineas, a murder pamphlet claimed that he left £80,000 in gold, and the Earl and the Countess of Salisbury recorded from his later trial that it was "£140-0-0". He was committed to St Alban's gaol.

== Funeral of Bennet ==
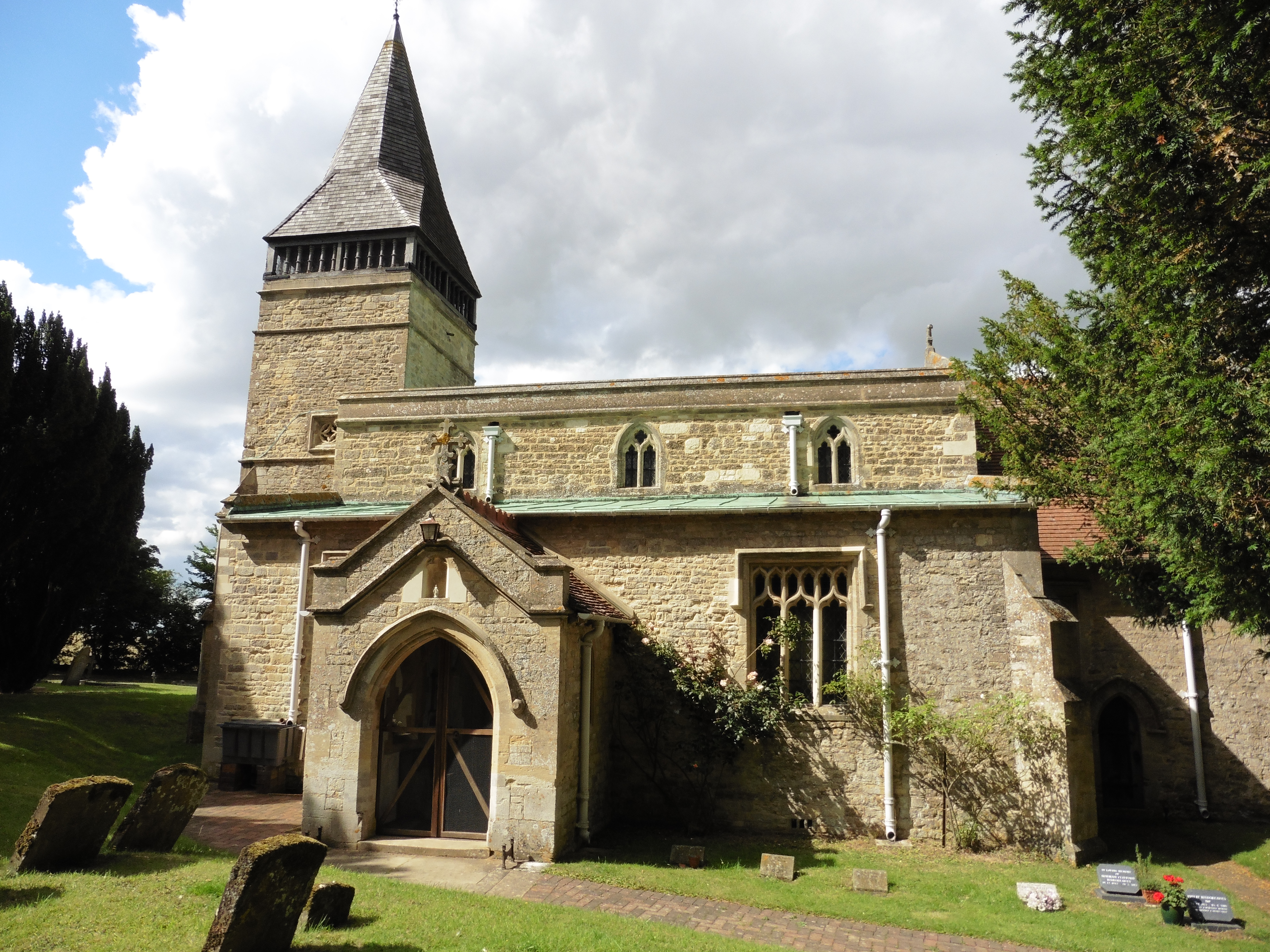
Bennet was buried at the church in Beachampton

Bennet's funeral was held at Hatfield House and was lavish; her body was laid in state in a double coffin that was covered in velvet, and the rooms were hung with black cloth. Forty rings were given to each of the men and women who were mourning. Her hearse was drawn by six horses over five days to Beachampton church in Buckinghamshire, where she was buried on 27 September 1694 alongside her dead children, her husband Simon, and his uncle Sir Simon Bennet. Small flags were put on Simon's funeral monument for this interment.

Many continued to view Bennet in a negative light following her death, with Thomas Bruce, 2nd Earl of Ailesbury, who knew her daughter Frances and whose sister married into the family, calling Bennet "the most sordid person that ever lived." An 18th century writer wrote that she was "a miserable, covetous, and wretched person".

== Trial, execution and gibbeting of Barnes ==
Barnes's trial began in St Albans in Hertforshire, with Barnes being held at the St Albans gaol, then moved to Aylesbury, the county town of Buckinghamshire, for judicial proceedings paid for by the Earl and the Countess of Salisbury, Bennet's daughter, as well as with money from the robbery itself. At the trial, Barnes was found guilty of the murder of Bennet.

Following the trial, one John Billington was given £2 for "making the bodies and ironwork to the gallows", and John Gray was paid £2 12d for making the gallows and finding timber. John Clarke earned £1 10d for obtaining Barnes's body from its execution at Aylesbury. Barnes was left to hang in chains on a lane behind Calverton Manor, where Barnes had entered the property, which became known as Gib Lane.

In 1697, Celia Fiennes passed by the manor on her journey from Coventry to London; she wrote that Bennet was "remarkable for covetousness which was the cause of her death", and that the butcher who killed her "hangs in chains just against her house."

The site of the gibbet is known today, at the OS coordinates SP793392.
