= Gibbeting of Robert and William Drewitt =

1799 post-execution display of English robbers

In 1799, the bodies of the brothers Robert and William Drewitt were gibbeted, or hung in cages for display, on North Heath Common near Midhurst, Sussex, England. The pair had been executed on Horsham Common on 13 April 1799 after being found guilty in March for the robbery of the Portsmouth Mail. Their subsequent gibbeting was attended by around 2,000 people, and the hand of the dead Robert Drewitt was used by those who believed it would cure their illnesses such as scrofula for months after the brothers' execution. The story of the brothers was recorded in oral histories into the 1870s.

== Trial and execution ==
At the Spring Assizes in Sussex which began on 25 March 1799, the court found William and Robert Drewitt, two brothers, guilty of the robbery of the Portsmouth Mail. The judiciary intended to make an example out of the pair so as to prevent future robberies. On 13 April 1799, the brothers were executed on Horsham Common. There was a wide belief amongst the public that Robert Drewitt was wrongly executed. After the execution, the brothers' bodies were transported for gibbeting.

== Gibbeting ==
At North Heath Common, near Midhurst, around 2,000 people attended and watched the gibbeting from booths that had been set up "as at a horse race or cricket match". Their gibbeting cost £35 8s, while the cost of their irons themselves were £10 10s, and the total expense of their execution was £45 18s. Newspapers noted that the father of William and Robert "spent the remainder of his days in sitting at the foot of the gibbet on which swung the bodies of his two sons".

Following their gibbeting, in 1799 it was reported that two young women "of genteel appearance" who had scrofula came to the gibbets so they could stroke their necks with a hand of one of the two brothers, as they believed that the touch of a dead man's hand could cure disease. After this, it was further reported that over the next months many individuals travelled to the site so they could hold up their children and have Robert's hand touch their throats. This was unusual as usually the hand of a newly-hanged man was preferred.

In the 1870s, the story of the brothers still appeared in oral histories of the communities that used North Heath Common, with stories of their crimes being passed down through storytelling. An 1871 study by the Sussex Archaeological Society perhaps sensationally noted that older locals would "point with fear and trembling to the place where the gibbet stood".

== Sources ==
- Tarlow, Sarah (2017). The Golden and Ghoulish Age of the Gibbet in Britain. London: Palgrave Macmillan UK. doi:10.1057/978-1-137-60089-9. ISBN 978-1-137-60088-2.
