= Murder of Michael Williams =

1789 robbery and murder of English man

- Location: Burrows Lane, Hendon, Middlesex, England
- Date: 3 January 1789
- Victim: Michael Williams
- Assailant: Cornelius Carty
- Verdict: Guilty
- Convictions: Murder and robbery

On 3 January 1789 on Burrows Lane in Hendon, the English man Michael Williams was stabbed in the head by the highwayman Cornelius Carty during a robbery that took place when Williams and his family were travelling to North London. Williams died three days later. Carty was convicted of murder and robbery at the Old Bailey, and was sentenced to death on 14 January that year. Carty was executed near the site of the crime, and also gibbeted (displayed in a cage post-execution) near to the four-mile stone on Edgware Road.

== Murder ==
On 3 January 1789, Michael Williams was travelling on Burrows Lane, through Hendon to north London, alongside his wife and son in a one-horse cart. Carty, a highwayman, threatened the family with his pistol and demanded money; Williams acquiesced and gave Carty all of his money. Carty then used a knife to stab Williams in the head; court proceedings detail that he struck "in and upon the right-side of the head, near the right-eye", creating a wound two inches deep and three inches wide. Williams's son apprehended Carty with the aid of two farmers, arresting him at the scene; he had 2s 1d in his pocket. Michael Williams died from his wounds three days later on 6 January, a surgeon's efforts to keep him alive being in vain.

== Trial, execution and gibbeting of Cornelius Carty ==
In court alongside Thomas Ryan and Patrick Ephernon, Carty was charged with murder and robbery, and convicted at the Old Bailey; his sentencing took place on 14 January 1789. He was initially sentenced for dissection, though a different body became available to the surgeons when another murderer was convicted during the same court sessions, leading Carty's sentence to be switched to gibbeting. This sentence was also intended to act as a warning to other highwaymen.

In January 1789, at the site of the crime, Carty was executed. Then, also near the site of the crime, near the four-mile stone on Edgware Road, Carty was gibbeted. He was covered in the Newgate Calendar alongside William Woodcock; it described them as "atrocious villains".

William Hugh Burgess, a teenage diarist, wrote that on 6 February 1789 alongside his brother John (whom he referred to as Jack), he went to see "the man hanging in chains". This would have been Carty. Burgess did not note how he and his brother felt about the gibbet.

== Sources ==
- Devereaux, Simon (31 October 2023). "The Murder Act: Hanging in Chains, 1660–1834". Execution, State and Society in England, 1660–1900 (1 ed.). Cambridge University Press. doi:10.1017/9781009392129.006. ISBN 978-1-009-39212-9.
