= Mattishall =

Village in Norfolk, England

Coordinates: 52.6585°N 1.03466°E

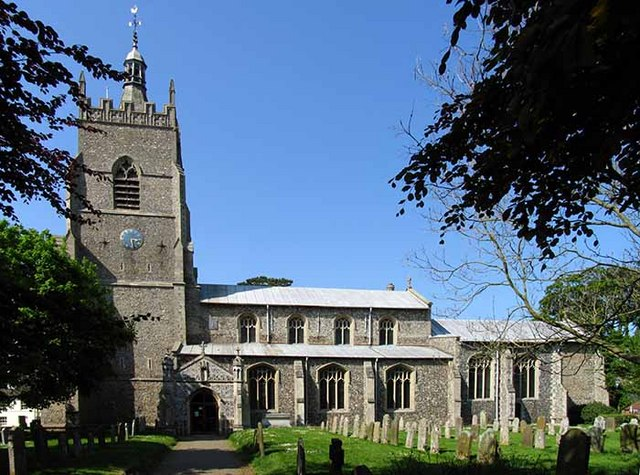
- All Saints Church, Mattishall

- Location within Norfolk
- Area: 11.89 km^{2} (4.59 sq mi)
- Population: 2,631 (2011)
  - Density: 221/km^{2} (570/sq mi)
- OS grid reference: TG053110
  - London: 123 miles
- Civil parish: Mattishall
- District: Breckland
- Shire county: Norfolk
- Region: East
- Country: England
- Sovereign state: United Kingdom
- Post town: DEREHAM
- Postcode district: NR20
- Dialling code: 01362
- Police: Norfolk
- Fire: Norfolk
- Ambulance: East of England
- UK Parliament: Mid Norfolk

Mattishall is a village and civil parish in the English county of Norfolk. It is situated 13 miles (21 km) west of Norwich and 4 miles (6.4 km) east of Dereham, at the geographical centre of Norfolk.

It covers an area of 11.89 km^{2} (4.59 sq mi) and had a population of 2,631 in 1,110 households at the 2001 census. For the purposes of local government, it falls within the Elmham and Mattishall division of Norfolk County Council and the Mattishall ward of Breckland District Council.

== History ==
The village's name probably means, 'Ma(e)tt's nook of land'.

It is situated on a plateau of boulder clay left by the glaciers about 300,000 years ago. The soil in the area varies from sands around the neighbouring Mattishall Burgh to stickier clays around Mattishall.

Evidence of human activity in these villages reaches back to the period between 8000 and 1000 BC. The discovery in 1968 of a hoard of 110 silver coins provides a link with the Roman period. However no proof of Roman occupation has been found so far. The four panels of the Mattishall village sign, erected in 1984, depict different periods of history from Roman, the Domesday Survey of 1086, medieval to the mid-twentieth century.

The All Saints Church in Mattishall dates from the late fourteenth century, possibly replacing an earlier church on the site. The patron is Gonville and Caius College, Cambridge and it is thought that Dr. Caius was instrumental in initiating the building of the larger church. Saint Peter's Church, in Mattishall Burgh, is much smaller and is mainly late thirteenth century. During the later Middle Ages, the wool-broggers of Norfolk, who distributed wool from its wool growing western districts to spinners in Norwich and the north-east industrial district of Norfolk, were centered in Mattishall.

Mattishall has been divided in a religious sense for many years, first with the Reformation, then with the growth of Quakerism. The Quakers established a Meeting House in 1687. Almost 100 years later the Old Moor Congregational Chapel was built. Both had their own burial ground. When it became uneconomical to continue at Old Moor, the Congregationalists transferred to their Lecture Room in Welgate built in 1829. It is now the United Reformed Church. Primitive Methodism gained a following in the nineteenth century but it was not until 1900 that a site was found for a permanent meeting place along the main road. The second half of the twentieth century saw the establishment of the Evangelical Church.

During the reign of Edward VI, cleric Matthew Parker married Margaret Harlestone of Mattishall. He became the first Archbishop of Canterbury to be appointed under Elizabeth I. Local tradition has it that the house behind the butcher's shop in Church Plain was the Harlestone family home.

Some of the very old buildings in Mattishall are hidden behind brick and mortar skins and Georgian facades, but others remain to be admired. Of the three nineteenth century mills, the bases of two remain. One has been converted recently into a holiday cottage. By 1783, Mattishall's rector estimated that 22% of the sown land in the parish was under turnips, and 26% was under clover. From March 1785, the body of James Cliffen was gibbeted on Badley Moor on the parish boundary between Yaxham and Mattishall, the site resembling a fair for several weeks after his death, and Parson Woodforde visited the body in April. It remained there for about 25 years, until the enclosure of the parish's common land led to its removal the same year.

The National School (subsequently Mattishall First School and Mattishall Middle School, and since 2005 merged to become simply Mattishall Primary School) was built in 1872. A notable headmistress was Miss Johnson (1884–1919), the daughter of the station master at Hardingham. Miss Mildred Edwards, a pupil-teacher, was still around when the school celebrated its centenary. It was she who planted the conker, which grew into the very large chestnut tree in the garden of Church Cottage near the corner of the school playing field.

The fortunes and well-being of the villagers have fluctuated over the centuries. In 1835 the family of Sir William Edward Parry, the polar explorer, occupied South Green House (now Mattishall Hall) for a few months. On half pay from the navy, he was sent to Norfolk as an Assistant Commissioner for the New Poor Law. His sister-in-law wrote to her mother, "...a large population, immense families, and not work for half, and no resident gentleman near to do anything for them... such a disagreeable neighbourhood...".

There have been many developments since the 1960s: a memorial hall, a sports and social club, new school buildings on a large site and a surgery, pharmacy, hairdressers and local shops.

== Economy ==
In the sixteenth century the wool merchants of Mattishall were well-known, or even notorious, in East Anglia. A number of them were warned or fined by the court for failing to sell their wool through Norwich Market. They had found more lucrative outlets in Suffolk and other places.

Apart from husbandry, wool-combing and weaving, many other trades were followed in the area. There was a decline in the wool trade in the eighteenth century, which led to unemployment for combers and weavers. These occupations had almost disappeared by the beginning of the nineteenth century. Some found work on the land but others became chargeable on the Parish and either suffered the indignity of living in accommodation set aside for paupers or worse still were sent to the workhouse at Gressenhall.

Most farmers brewed beer but brewing on a larger scale centred on the Malthouse which was demolished in the 1920s. Apart from the Swan Inn, The George and Cross Keys there were several ale houses dotted around the villages and in the nineteenth century included The White House, The Ringers, Ivy Cottage, The Duke of Edinburgh and The Crown and Anchor. Today only The Swan survives as a public house, in a twentieth-century building, which replaced the old thatched building of centuries past.

Despite the modern settlement's growing size numerous local shops and businesses have not survived the advent of the family car and of supermarkets and hypermarkets. The haulage business of A. J. Farrow provided local employment for many people for more than 50 years. Other family business, all names which have now gone, include Dobbs, King, Horne, Fisher, Howard, Turner and Reynolds. Norton's Bakery was run by a member of the family but has ceased trading like Hewitt's Butchers which is just a trade name now. In farming, the name Hill spans several generations. DC Gaskins Automotive Engineers remains one of the larger business operations in the village. Poultec Training and South Green Park is thought to be the largest employer in the village.

== Population ==
The population of the two villages reached a peak of 1,385 in 1841 and then began to decline as, due to mechanisation on farms, people left the area to look for work. By 1931 the figure had dropped to 829 and by 1961 was only 929. Since then substantial development and infilling has taken place resulting in rapid increases in the population.

== Notable people ==
- James Bailey
