= Gibbeting of William Bennington =

1795 post-execution display of English murderer

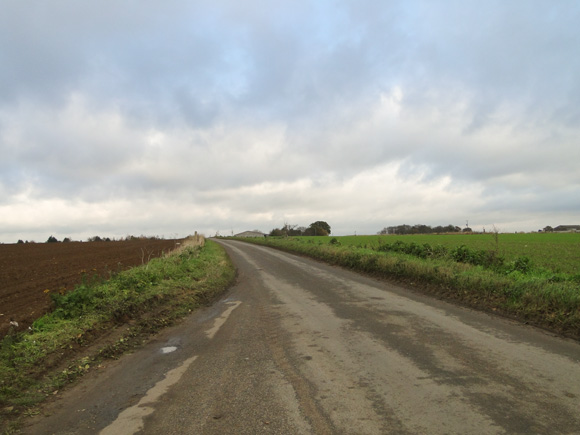
Gibbet Lane, named after Bennington's gibbet

The gibbeting of William Bennington took place near the parish boundary between West Dereham and Wereham, following his execution at Thetford on 25 March 1795. Bennington was a servant of John Filbee in West Dereham in Norfolk, England who murdered his master and was sentenced to death for the crime.

== Execution and gibbeting ==
Bennington was accused of murdering his master, John Filbee of West Dereham. He was tried at the Norfolk assize in Thetford, on 20 March 1795, alongside Stephen Watson who had been accused of poisoning his wife. Bennington was sentenced to hang in chains.

Due to the Murder Act, only two days were allowed between sentencing and execution. This was seen as insufficient time for the transportation of Watson and Bennington to the usual location of Castle Hill in Norwich for hanging; festivities that took place on this road risked causing a delay. So, the decision was taken to execute Bennington and Watson at Thetford rather than the usual Norwich location to retain solemnity for the occasion. The Morning Post at the time remarked that although "an execution had not taken place at Thetford for many years, the propriety of it in the present instance is obvious. The interval allowed in cases of murder between sentence and execution is only 48 hours, which time, had the unhappy men been conveyed to Norwich would have been consumed in festivity on the road instead of being dedicated to penitence and supplication."

After his execution, Bennington's body was taken 20 miles back to Dereham, where he was gibbeted close to the parish boundary separating West Dereham from Wereham. The gibbeting cost £14, with the total execution expenses coming to £29. A few years after a similar event took place with the body of Stephen Watson in 1801, it was reported that blue tits had nested in Bennington's skull, and that "from his skull flew out a blue tit and her family of nine or ten". A map by William Faden shows that the gibbet was located adjacent to a road, and later research has shown that this was, an area of common land at the time. This section of road, which follows the course of the present parish boundary after enclosure, is today known as 'Gibbet Lane', and was labeled as such on an 1810 map.
