= Badley Moor =

UK Site of Special Scientific Interest

Coordinates: 52.666°N 0.974°E

- Site of Special Scientific Interest
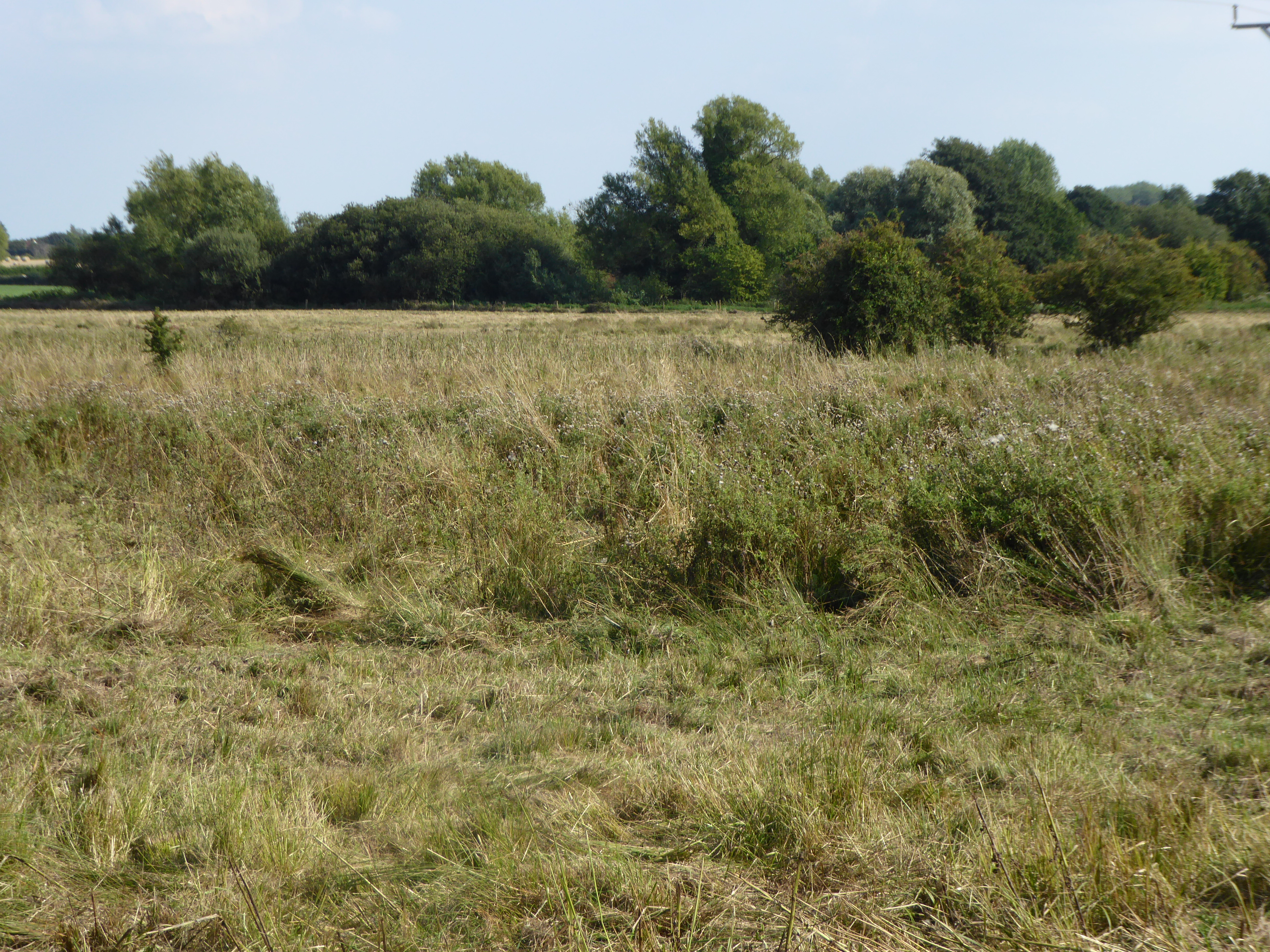
- Location of Badley Moor.
- Area of search: Norfolk, England
- Grid reference: TG 012 117
- Interest: Biological
- Area: 18.3 hectares (45 acres)
- Notification date: 1986
- Location map: Magic Map

Badley Moor is an 18.3-hectare (45-acre) biological Site of Special Scientific Interest east of Dereham in Norfolk, England. It is part of the Norfolk Valley Fens Special Area of Conservation.

This area of spring fed fen and grassland in the valley of the River Tud has tufa hummocks formed by the deposit of calcium carbonate. It has an exceptionally rich fen community with a carpet of moss on wet slopes with many unusual plants. There are overgrown dykes with flora including narrow-leaved water-parsnip and water dropwort.

For around 25 years from 1785 onward, a gibbet holding murderer James Cliffen's remains was a local landmark on Badley Moor, visible across the moor and on William Faden's 1797 map of the county. It was removed after the enclosure of this common land.
