= Drinsey Nook =

Village in Lincolnshire, England

Coordinates: 53.259189°N 0.696325°W

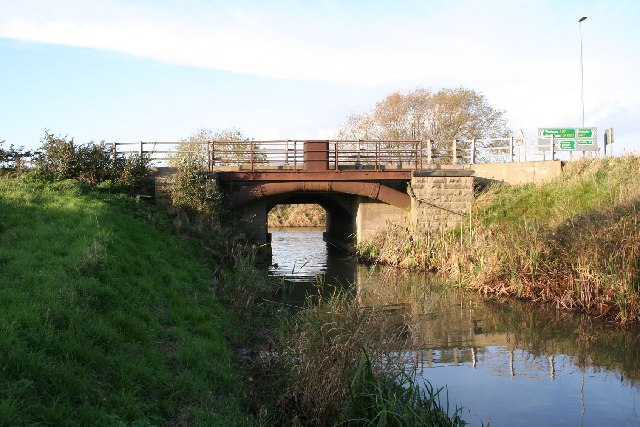
- Tom Otter's Bridge

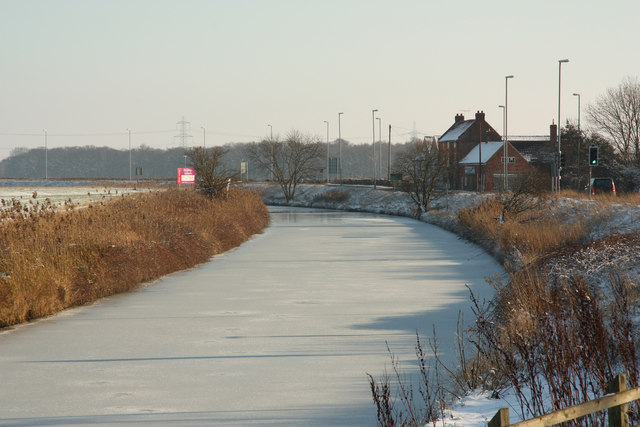
- The Foss Dyke, frosted over

- Location within Lincolnshire
- OS grid reference: SK870743
  - London: 153 mi (246 km) S
- District: West Lindsey
- Shire county: Lincolnshire
- Region: East Midlands
- Country: England
- Sovereign state: United Kingdom
- Post town: Lincoln
- Postcode district: LN1
- Police: Lincolnshire
- Fire: Lincolnshire
- Ambulance: East Midlands
- UK Parliament: Gainsborough

Drinsey Nook is a small village in the West Lindsey district of Lincolnshire, England. It is situated approximately 2 miles (3 km) south-west from Saxilby, close to the county border with Nottinghamshire. The village sits on the bank of the Foss Dyke, a canal which runs from the River Trent at Torksey to the River Witham in Lincoln. The population of the village is included in the civil parish of Kettlethorpe.

The main building is the former Drinsey Nook Inn which is actually situated in Nottinghamshire; this was previously known as the 'Buffalo Inn' on old Ordnance Survey maps.

Drinsey Nook is notable for Tom Otter, a man who murdered his new wife in 1805. Otter, reputedly from Treswell, was already a married when he married his wife, Mary, whom he murdered the same day near the bridge that now bears his name. He was hanged in 1806, and was held in a Gibbet post adjacent to Gibbet Wood. Tom Otter lane is the B1190 running south from the village, and Tom Otters Bridge is named after the site of the murder.

More recently it has been the location of a case of modern slavery.
