= Bradenham, Norfolk =

Village in Norfolk, England

Coordinates: 52.640°N 0.844°E

Bradenham
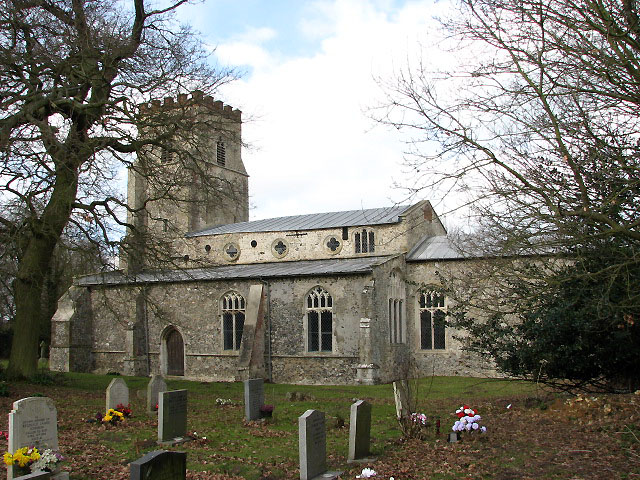
- St Mary's Church, now redundant

- Location within Norfolk
- Area: 16.55 km^{2} (6.39 sq mi)
- Population: 695 (2021 census)
  - Density: 42/km^{2} (110/sq mi)
- OS grid reference: TF 9208
- Civil parish: Bradenham
- District: Breckland
- Shire county: Norfolk
- Region: East
- Country: England
- Sovereign state: United Kingdom
- Post town: Thetford
- Postcode district: IP25
- Dialling code: 01362/01760
- Police: Norfolk
- Fire: Norfolk
- Ambulance: East of England
- UK Parliament: Mid Norfolk

Bradenham is a village and civil parish in the English county of Norfolk. It is 5 miles (8.0 km) south-west of the town of Dereham and 19 miles (31 km) west of the city of Norwich. The parish was formed of the parishes of East Bradenham and West Bradenham which have been joined. It includes the hamlets of High Green and West End.

== History ==
In the Domesday Book, Bradenham is recorded as a settlement of 53 households in the hundred of Greenhoe and was part of the estates of William de Warenne, Ralph of Tosny and Ralph Baynard.

West Bradenham Hall was built at some point between the 16th and mid-18th centuries, replacing an earlier building surrounded by a medieval moat. It was owned by the Haggard family and was the birthplace of H. Rider Haggard. Admiral Nelson is recorded as having stayed at the house. East Bradenham Hall, dating form the 17th-century, was rebuilt at around 1800.

From 1795, Stephen Watson's gibbet was located on common land between West Bradenham and Holme Hale. This remained hanging until at least October 1837, being the last gibbet to stand in Norfolk, and was at some point after this buried; it was discovered like this by H. Rider Haggard in 1899 and given to Norwich Castle Museum.

During the Second World War, a decoy airfield was built in the village.

== Geography ==
According to the 2021 census, Bradenham has a population of 695 people which shows a slight decrease from the 700 people recorded in the 2011 census.

The River Wissey rises in the parish and flows to the west, whilst the River Yare rises to the east of Bradenham and flows to the east.

== Churches ==
West Bradenham's parish church is dedicated to Saint Andrew and located on Church Lane. The church is early medieval in origin and features stained-glass windows depicting the Gospels by the O'Connor Brothers and an east window depicting the Crucifixion of Christ by William Wailes. It is Grade I listed.

St Mary's Church, East Bradenham is dedicated to St Mary. It has been redundant since 1973 and is also Grade I listed.

== Notable people ==
The Haggard family lived at West Bradenham Hall. The author H. Rider Haggard (1856–1925) recorded details of his life at the house.

== Governance ==
Bradenham is part of the electoral ward of Saham Toney for local elections and is part of the district of Breckland. It is part of the Mid Norfolk parliamentary constituency.
