= Knobstick wedding =

Type of forced marriage

A knobstick wedding is the forced marriage of a pregnant single woman with the man known or believed to be the father. It derives its name from the staves of office carried by the church wardens whose presence was intended to ensure that the ceremony took place. The practice and the term were most prevalent in the United Kingdom in the 18th century.

Motivation for these arrangements was primarily financial – local parishes were obliged to provide relief for single mothers under the laws regarding "poor relief". After the passing of the Bastardy Act in 1733 it became the responsibility of the father to pay for the maintenance of the child. Local authorities therefore encouraged the woman to enter into a marriage with the person presumed to be the father in an attempt to reduce their spending and shift the responsibility to the identified man. On some occasions the parish would pay the man to marry the woman, while there are also accounts of more aggressive tactics. In one case, recorded in the 6 October 1829 edition of The Times, a man was coerced into marrying the woman he was accused of making pregnant. The authorities, referred to as the "parish overseers", threatened to hang him if he did not go through with the arrangement. Feeling that he had no option he agreed to the marriage and the pair were wed. However, those responsible for forcing the partnership were later called to face charges of "fraudulently procuring the marriage".

The practice of forcing a man to marry a woman whom he had made pregnant is also known as a "shotgun wedding". Knobstick weddings, however, more usually refer to those arrangements forced by a local parish.

== See also ==
- Bastard (law of England and Wales)
- Forced marriage
- Legitimacy (family law)
- Shotgun wedding
- Marry-your-rapist law
